= List of Irish mythological figures =

Figures in Irish mythology include the following:

== Mythological Cycle ==
=== Tuatha Dé Danann ===
==== Notable figures ====
- Aengus - god of passionate and romantic love, youth and poetic inspiration
- Áine - goddess of parental and familial love, summer, wealth and sovereignty
- Banba, Ériu and Fódla - patron goddesses of Ireland
- Bodb Derg - king of the Tuatha Dé Danann
- Brigid - daughter of the Dagda; associated with healing, fertility, craft, platonic love, and poetry
- Clíodhna - queen of the Banshees, goddess of fantasized love, beauty, and the sea
- The Dagda - supreme god and king of the Tuatha Dé Danann
- Danu - mother goddess of the Tuatha Dé Danann
- Dian Cecht - god of healing
- Étaín - heroine of Tochmarc Étaíne
- Lir - god of the sea
- Lugh - legendary hero and High King of Ireland, god of leadership, skills, the sun, and alliances, associated with friends.
- Maine mac Darthacht - owner of a cloak fastened by eight stones
- Manannán mac Lir - god of the sea, like his father Lir
- Nuada Airgetlám - first king of the Tuatha Dé Danann
- Ogma - warrior-poet, said to have invented the Ogham alphabet
- Trí Dée Dána - three gods of crafting
  - Creidhne - artificer of the Tuatha Dé Danann, working in bronze, brass and gold
  - Goibniu - smith of the Tuatha Dé Danann
  - Luchtaine - carpenter of the Tuatha Dé Danann
- The Triple Goddess
  - Badb - war goddess who caused fear and confusion among soldiers, often taking the form of a crow
  - Macha - goddess associated with war, battle, horses and sovereignty
  - The Morrígan - goddess of battle, strife and fertility

==== Lesser figures ====
- Abartach - also known as the Giolla Deacair ("the hard servant"), he was associated with Fionn mac Cumhaill
- Abcán - dwarf poet of the Tuatha Dé Danann
- Abhean - poet of the Tuatha Dé Danann
- Aed - god of the underworld
- Aoi Mac Ollamain - god of poetry
- Airmed - daughter of Dian Cecht; associated with healing
- Anann - another name for the Morrígan
- Beag - minor goddess, known for possessing a magic well
- Bé Chuille - sorceress of the Tuatha Dé Danann
- Bébinn - goddess associated with birth
- Boann - goddess of the River Boyne
- Brea - minor god of the Tuatha Dé Danann
- Bres - unpopular and treacherous fomorian king of the Tuatha Dé Danann
- Brian - son of Tuireann and murderer of Cían
- Caer Ibormeith - princess cursed to spend every second year in the form of a swan
- Cermait - son of the Dagda, killed by Lugh
- Cían - father of Lugh; able to shapeshift at will
- Danand - daughter of Delbáeth
- Delbáeth - king of the Tuatha Dé Danann
- Ecne - god of wisdom and knowledge
- Egobail - foster son of Manannan mac Lir and father of Aine
- Elcmar - chief steward to the Dagda
- Ernmas - mother goddess
- Fand - sea goddess and lover of Cú Chulainn
- Fiacha mac Delbaíth - legendary High King of Ireland
- Fionnuala - daughter of Lir, who was transformed into a swan and cursed by her stepmother
- Flidais - goddess of cattle and milking
- Fuamnach - witch of the Tuatha Dé Danann
- Iuchar - son of Tuireann and murderer of Cían
- Iucharba - son of Tuireann and murderer of Cían
- Lí Ban - sister of Fand
- Mac Cuill, Mac Cecht and Mac Gréine - trio of brothers who killed Lugh and shared the kingship of Ireland between each other
- Miach - healer and son of Dian Cecht, killed by his father out of jealousy due to his superior healing talents
- Midir - son of the Dagda
- Nechtan - father and/or husband of Boann
- Neit - god of war
- Nemain - a goddess of war; possibly an alternative name for Badb
- Niamh - queen of Tír na nÓg
- Tuireann - father of Creidhne, Luchtaine and Goibniu

=== Fir Bolg ===
- Eochaid mac Eirc - High King of Ireland, the last Fir Bolg king and the first king to establish a system of justice
- Fiacha Cennfinnán - High King of Ireland
- Fodbgen - High King of Ireland
- Gaillimh iníon Breasail - mythical woman from whom the river and city of Galway derive their name
- Gann and Genann - joint High Kings of Ireland
- Rinnal - High King of Ireland and the first king to use spearheads
- Rudraige mac Dela - second High King of Ireland
- Sengann mac Dela - High King of Ireland
- Sláine mac Dela - first High King of Ireland
- Sreng - champion of the Fir Bolg who cut off Nuada's arm
- Tailtiu - wife of Eochaid mac Eirc and foster mother of Lugh, who died clearing plains of Ireland for agriculture

=== Fomorians ===
- Balor - last king of the Fomorians, capable of killing with his deadly eye
- Buarainech - parent of Balor
- Cethlenn - prophetess and wife of Balor
- Cichol Gricenchos - early leader of the Fomorians
- Conand - oppressive leader of the Fomorians
- Elatha - Fomorian prince
- Tethra - ruler of Mag Mell following his death during the Second Battle of Mag Tuired
- Ethniu - daughter of Balor and mother of Lugh

=== Milesians ===
- Amergin Glúingel - druid, bard and judge
- Eber Finn - High King of Ireland
- Érimón - High King of Ireland
- Míl Espáine - Irish ancestral figure

== Ulster Cycle ==
=== Major characters ===
- Ailill mac Máta - king of Connacht and husband of Medb
- Conchobar mac Nessa - king of Ulster
- Cú Chulainn - mythological hero known for his terrible battle frenzy
- Deirdre - tragic heroine of the Ulster Cycle; when she was born it was prophesied that she would be beautiful, but that kings and lords would go to war over her
- Donn Cuailnge - Brown Bull of Cooley, an extremely fertile stud bull over whom the war known as the Táin Bó Cúailnge was fought
- Fergus mac Róich - former king of Ulster, now in exile
- Medb - queen of Connacht, best known for starting the Táin Bó Cúailnge

=== Ulster characters ===
- Amergin mac Eccit - poet and warrior in the court of Conchobar mac Nessa
- Athirne - poet and satirist in the court of Conchobar mac Nessa
- Blaí Briugu - Ulster warrior with a geis which requires him to sleep with any woman who stays at his hostel unaccompanied
- Bricriu - hospitaller, troublemaker and poet
- Cathbad - chief druid in the court of Conchobar mac Nessa
- Celtchar - hero of the Ulaid
- Cethern mac Fintain - Ulster warrior who assists Cú Chulainn
- Conall Cernach - hero of the Ulaid
- Cruinniuc - wealthy cattle owner who marries a mysterious woman, later revealed to be the goddess Macha
- Cúscraid - son of Conchobar mac Nessa
- Dáire mac Fiachna - Ulster cattle-lord and owner of Donn Cuailnge, the Brown Bull of Cooley
- Deichtine - mother of Cú Chulainn
- Éogan mac Durthacht - King of Fernmag
- Fedlimid mac Daill - harper and chief storyteller in the court of Conchobar mac Nessa
- Fergus Mac Roich - Former king of Ulster. Narrator of Tain Bo Cuailnge.
- Findchóem - sister of Conchobar mac Nessa and wet nurse of Cú Chulainn
- Furbaide Ferbend - son of Conchobar mac Nessa
- Láeg - charioteer of Cú Chulainn
- Lóegaire Búadach - hapless Ulster warrior who functions largely as comic relief
- Mugain - wife of Conchobar mac Nessa
- Naoise - lover of Deirdre
- Ness - mother of Conchobar mac Nessa
- Súaltam - mortal father of Cú Chulainn

=== Connacht characters ===
- Bélchú - warrior of Connacht
- Cet mac Mágach - warrior of Connacht
- Ferdiad - warrior of Connacht
- Findabair - daughter of Ailill and Medb
- Fráech - warrior of Connacht, who woos Findabair
- Nera - warrior of Connacht

=== Ulster exiles ===
- Cormac Cond Longas - eldest son of Conchobar mac Nessa
- Dubthach Dóeltenga - cynical ally of Fergus mac Róich

=== Other characters ===
- Achall - daughter of Cairbre Nia Fer
- Áed Rúad, Díthorba and Cimbáeth - three brothers who shared the kingship of Ireland
- Aífe - rival of Scáthach
- Bláthnat - wife of Cú Roí and lover of Cú Chulainn
- Connla - son of Cú Chulainn and Aife
- Cairbre Nia Fer - king of Tara
- Cú Roí - warrior king of Munster
- Emer wife of Cú Chulainn
- Erc mac Cairpri - son of Cairbre Nia Fer
- Fedelm - female prophet and poet
- Fedelm Noíchrothach - daughter of Conchobar mac Nessa, unfaithful wife of Cairbre Nia Fer and lover of both Cú Chulainn and Conall Cernach
- Flidais - lover of Fergus mac Róich
- Lugaid mac Con Roí - son of Cú Roí and killer of Cú Chulainn
- Mesgegra - king of Leinster
- Scáthach - legendary warrior woman who trains Cú Chulainn in the arts of combat
- Uathach - daughter of Scáthach

== Fenian Cycle ==
=== The Fianna ===
- Fionn mac Cumhaill - legendary hunter-warrior and leader of the Fianna
- Caílte mac Rónáin - warrior of the Fianna who could run at remarkable speed and communicate with animals, and was a great storyteller
- Conán mac Morna - warrior of the Fianna, often portrayed as a troublemaker and a comic figure
- Cumhall - leader of the Fianna and father of Fionn mac Cumhaill
- Diarmuid Ua Duibhne - warrior of the Fianna and lover of Fionn's betrothed, Gráinne
- Goll mac Morna - warrior of the Fianna and uneasy ally of Fionn mac Cumhaill
- Liath Luachra - Fionn's foster mother and a great warrior
- Liath Luachra - tall, hideous warrior of the Fianna who shares his name with Fionn's foster mother
- Oisín - son of Fionn mac Cumhaill, warrior of the Fianna and a great poet
- Oscar - warrior son of Oisín and Niamh
- Cú Chulainn - likely a demigod of Lugh

=== Other characters ===
- Aillen - monstrous being killed by Fionn mac Cumhaill
- Bodhmall - druidess, warrior woman and aunt of Fionn mac Cumhaill
- Cormac mac Airt - legendary High King of Ireland
- Finn Eces - poet, sage, and teacher of Fionn mac Cumhaill
- Gráinne - lover of Diarmuid Ua Duibhne, betrothed to Fionn mac Cumhaill
- Mug Ruith - powerful blind druid
- Plor na mBan - daughter of Oisín and Niamh
- Sadhbh - mother of Oisín by Fionn mac Cumhaill

== Other ==
- Aibell - fairy queen of Thomond
- Amadan Dubh - trickster fairy known as the "dark fool"
- Cailleach - divine hag
- Canola - mythical inventor of the harp
- Medb Lethderg - goddess of sovereignty associated with Tara
- Tlachtga - powerful druidess
