= Mac Dela =

Mac Dela is an Irish surname, and may refer to:

- Gann mac Dela, legendary joint High King of Ireland with his brother Genann.
- Genann mac Dela, legendary joint High King of Ireland with his brother Gann.
- Rudraige mac Dela, legendary second High King of Ireland.
- Sengann mac Dela, legendary High King of Ireland.
- Sláine mac Dela, legendary first High King of Ireland.
