= Sláine (character) =

Comic book character

Sláine MacRoth
- Sláine graphic novel cover by Mike McMahon

Publication information
- Publisher: IPC Magazines (until 1999) / Rebellion Developments
- First appearance: 2000 AD #330 (20 August 1983)
- Created by: Pat Mills; Angela Kincaid

In-story information
- Alter ego: Sláine mac Roth
- Team affiliations: Tribes of the Earth Goddess
- Abilities: Warp-spasm

Sláine (/ˈslɔːnjə/ SLAW-nyə, Irish: [ˈsˠl̪ˠaːnʲə]) is the hero of a barbarian fantasy comic adventure series based on Celtic myths and stories, first published in 1983 in British magazine 2000 AD, written by Pat Mills and initially drawn by his then wife, Angela Kincaid. Most of the early stories were drawn by Massimo Belardinelli and Mike McMahon. Other notable artists to have worked on the character include Glenn Fabry, Simon Bisley, Clint Langley and Simon Davis.

Sláine's favourite weapon is an axe called "Brainbiter". He has the power of the "warp spasm," a body-distorting battle frenzy of the Irish hero Cú Chulainn and the Welsh hero Arthur in which earth power "warps" through his body, turning him into a terrifying, monstrously powerful figure. He is a devotee of the earth goddess Danu, and has a child Kai with his childhood love Niamh. While his name is Irish in origin, the strong presence of Welsh mythological influences mean that Sláine "is really a general Celtic hero - as much British as Irish."

== Plot ==
Sláine is a wanderer who is banished from his tribe, the Sessair. He explores the Land of the Young (Irish: Tír na nÓg) with an unscrupulous dwarf called Ukko, fighting monsters and mercenaries. In one early adventure he rescues a maiden, Medb, from being sacrificed in a wicker man, only to earn her enmity – she was a devotee of Crom Cruach, the god to whom she was to be sacrificed, and was looking forward to the experience. Her master and mentor, the ancient, rotting and insane Lord Weird Slough Feg, leader of the evil Drunes, becomes the series' main villain.

Sláine encounters sky chariots (flying longships), dragons and prehistoric alien gods.

Sláine returns to his tribe and becomes king, leading them against the Fomorians, a race of sea demons who were oppressing them. In The Horned God, Sláine unites the tribes of the earth goddess against Slough Feg and his allies, while his personal devotion to the goddess leads to him becoming a new incarnation of the Horned God Carnun (based on the Gaulish deity Cernunnos). By the end of the story the Land of the Young is no more, and Sláine is the first High King of Ireland.

Sláine in Simon Bisley's version

In subsequent stories, Sláine is sent through time by Danu to fight alongside other heroes and heroines such as Boudica (with whom he fought against the Romans, Elfric, and William Wallace), and returns to Ireland to defend his people against new enemies alongside his wife Niamh.

These new enemies turn out to be a full Fomorian invasion led by Balor and Moloch, murdering, raping, and eating their way through Sláine's tribe until he is able to defeat Balor. The tribal council forces Sláine to let Moloch go, hoping he would fulfill his promise of keeping the Fomorians out of Ireland; instead, he returns to rape and murder Niamh. Wanting vengeance, Sláine abdicates the throne, and goes to Albion, killing Moloch. In his absence, his son Kai leaves the tribe to search for his father (eventually becoming a performer in an Albion carnival) and Ireland faces a second invasion – "the dread of Europe", Atlanteans whose ancestors had lived in Ireland before the tribes of Danu, and who had been forcibly turned into hosts – Golamhs – for the symbiotic Sea Demons under Lord Odacon (an offshoot of the Fomorians). When Sláine returns, he finds the new High King Sethor, former member of the council who had granted Moloch freedom, was willing to surrender half of Ireland to Odacon in return for the gifts of science and civilisation.

Sláine convinces the tribal council that the demons could be killed and war is once more declared on the invaders, but it was clear that Ireland would be constantly attacked by wave after wave of Fomorian invasion. Sláine suggests having the Tribe of Danu escape to the Otherworld - to which their Sky Chariots had been sent - to free them from the demons and allow the Atlanteans to settle peacefully in Ireland. Both armies unite against Odacon and his Sea Demons. Sláine frees the Atlantean leader Gael from being Odacon's Golamh, handing over Sethor to take his place, and they lead their armies to bolster the city of Tara. While the tribes fight a defensive battle, Sláine is sent to the Otherworld to secure Danu's blessings for the Tribes of the Earth Goddess to settle there. He returns with her power behind him and leads a charge that decimates Odacon's forces. In the aftermath, the Tribe is cast into the Otherworld, and Sláine assists Gael in destroying Odacon and the parasitic spawn with which he had infested the outer-lying villages.

With Gael as High King of Ireland and founder of the eventual Gaelic race, Sláine leaves to track down his son. He finds Kai at a travelling funfair, and later embarks on a quest to track down Crom Dubh, who he beheads, keeping his still-living head as a trophy until he gives it to the Fianna in exchange for the life of his old friend Nest, who the Fianna had taken prisoner.

In the final collection of stories, Sláine once again encounters the cult of the Drunes, now led by Slough Feg's son Gododin, and defeats them for good, before turning his attention to the land of Albion. Occupied by the Trojans and their tyrannical King Brutus, Sláine instigates a rebellion against them, laying waste to Brutus' personal fortress with the aid of a dragon, and swearing by his ancestors to keep fighting against tyranny until he dies.

== Sources and influences ==
Sláine's most obvious sources are Robert E. Howard's Conan the Barbarian and Cú Chulainn, the hero of the Ulster Cycle of Irish mythology. Mills derived much of the series' background from Celtic mythology and European prehistory (as did Howard: the name Conan is Irish and is borne by a number of mythological figures). Sláine himself is named after Sláine mac Dela, the first High King of Ireland, and his "warp-spasm" or body-distorting battle frenzy is derived from the ríastrad of Cúchulainn; "warp-spasm" is the term Thomas Kinsella used for ríastrad in his translation of The Táin. His barbed spear, the gae bolga, is also borrowed from Cú Chulainn, though his favourite weapon, the axe, is more usually associated with the Vikings or Anglo-Saxons than the Celts.

His patronymic, Mac Roth, is the name of the steward of Ailill and Medb, king and queen of Connacht, in the same cycle. The death of Sláine's mother, Macha, who was forced to run on foot in a chariot race because of her husband's boasting, is taken from the story of an Irish goddess called Macha.

Sláine's seduction of Niamh, the king's chosen bride who was brought up in seclusion until she was of age, is reminiscent of the Irish story of Deirdre. Cathbad, the druid who foretells the evil consequences of Deirdre's birth and appears in several other tales of the Ulster Cycle, gives his name to Sláine's chief druid. Sláine's feat of crossing a raging river to visit her, weighed down by a heavy stone to prevent him from being swept away, is taken from an episode of the Táin. Niamh is a popular Irish girl's name, and is also the name of a fairy queen from the Fenian Cycle. Her otherworld homeland, Tír na nÓg (the Land of the Young), provides the name of the series' setting.

Sláine's goddess, Danu, and her tribes, the Tuatha Dé Danann, come from the Irish Mythological Cycle, though the worship of a universal mother goddess of the earth is not Celtic, and comes from speculations about prehistoric European culture and religion by people like Marija Gimbutas and Robert Graves. The Horned God, Carnun, is adapted from the Gaulish antlered deity Cernunnos.

Mills divides the priests of Tir na nÓg into two factions: the good Druids, the well known priestly class of Celtic Europe, and the evil Drunes, whose name derives from the Galatian place-name Drunemeton ("oak-sanctuary") used in the story "The Bride of Crom" as the name of the Drunes' capital. Their leader, Slough Feg, is partly based on Cernunnos and partly on the Paleolithic cave painting known as the Sorcerer in the Trois-Frères cave in Ariège, southern France. His acolyte, Medb, is named after the legendary queen of Connacht from the Ulster Cycle. The Drunes' god, Crom Cruach, is an Irish deity who was reputedly appeased with human sacrifices. The practice of mass human sacrifice by burning in a wicker man is mentioned as a practice of the Celts of Gaul by Strabo and Julius Caesar.

The enemies of the Tribes of the Earth Goddess, the Fomorians, and their leader Balor, are from the Irish mythological cycle.

Other elements of the series are derived from non-Celtic mythological sources. Sláine's dwarf companion is named Ukko, after the Finnish storm god. Odacon is identified in Theosophist circles with a Babylonian deity named Oannes, and is considered closely related to Dagon. Musarus, one of the same species as Odacon, shares this origin. Grimnismal, the name of the dark god Sláine and his companions defeat in "Tomb of Terror", is the title of a poem about Odin from the Norse Elder Edda. The term Ragnarok, for the end of the world, is also borrowed from Norse mythology.

=== Welsh Material ===
The comics regularly take place names and character names from Welsh history and mythology, especially Arthurian legend.

-Character names include: Gwawl, Kigva, Nest, Cador, Myrddin, Beli, Gwyn ap Nudd, Avagddu, Kai, Hu the Mighty, Blodeuwedd, Ceridwen, Pwyll, Gwalchmai, Gwenddolau, Peredur, Mabon, Rhonabwy, Gododin

-Place names include: Cythrawl, Gower, Dinas Emrys, Caer Sidi.

The Dragonheist arc is set in Wales. It features an excerpt from the Welsh saga poem The Death of Cynddylan in Part III, and mentioned the "Secret City" of druids in Dinas Emrys in Part VII.

The Spoils of Annwn references the poem Preiddeu Annwfn from The Book of Taliesin, including the mythical fortress of Caer Sidi. Gwyn ap Nudd acts as a Green Knight figure, given their beheading game.

In Slaine the King, the cauldron of blood revives the dead and does not feed the vicious, as in Branch II of The Mabinogion.

Some of the religious ideas in the series are taken from Barddas, a possibly fraudulent compilation of "bardo-druidic" beliefs by the 18th-century Welsh antiquarian Iolo Morganwg. The druid's "Three Rays of Power" appear as the Awen symbol, invented by Iolo Morganwg, in Sláine the King; Hu the Mighty is identified as the druidic "supreme deity and teacher of mankind" in The Horned God, where Iolo's invention of Coelbren y Beirdd also appears (however, it soon becomes clear that the Goddess is the highest deity to Sláine).

The Horned King mentions how Sláine "entered the cauldron of inspiration and tasted the three drops of wisdom," in reference to Hanes Taliesin. It also references the Avanc.

Demon Killer depicts the Roman conquest of Anglesey, referring to the Welsh island of Ynys Môn with the Latinized name "Mona," after which he joins up with the British Celt Boudicca.

The Lord of Misrule references The Battle of the Trees, a poem attributed to Taliesin.

The Treasures of Britain alludes to the conflict between the Red Dragon (representing Wales) and the White Dragon (representing the Saxons), as per Lludd and Llefelys and Historia Brittonum. Sláine's quest is this arc is to find the Thirteen Treasures of the Island of Britain, one of which is an invisibility cloak as used in the second branch of The Mabinogion.

The Banishing is set in Durrington College, where Sláine's son Kai learns the "sacred arts of astronomy, poetry and magic." Caesar's Commentaries on the Gallic War states that druids originated in Britain, and how people from other countries (such as Gaul) would send their young to study druidic practice there. Tacitus mentioned that Anglesey (Ynys Mon) was a druidic center.

The Bruntania Chronicles pick up on Historia Brittonum's claim that the Trojan Brutus founded Britain.

Dragontamer opens with a quotation from Geoffrey of Monmouth's The History of the Kings of Britain, which states that the first British was founded by Brutus of Troy; the comic suggests that this is a foreign empire that oppresses the Celtic Britons of Albion. The same issue mentions the Welsh beverage Metheglin, and that Sláine descends from character named Mabon. Brutus's sons Locer and Kamber become pacifists (these refer to the legendary founders of Lloegr/England and Cambria/Wales, respectively). London is referred to as Llandin, a variation on the Welsh Llundain. Sláine again uses the three rays of power, in reference to the Awen.

== Publication ==
The stories have been collected in a number of volumes but recent trade collections include:

- Sláine (written by Pat Mills unless stated):
  - Warrior's Dawn (2005, ISBN 1-904265-33-2):
    - "The Time Monster" (with Angela Kincaid, in 2000 AD No. 330, 1983)
    - "The Beast in the Broch" (with Massimo Belardinelli, in 2000 AD #331–334, 1983)
    - "Warrior's Dawn" (with Mike McMahon, in 2000 AD No. 335, 1983)
    - "The Beltain Giant" (with Mike McMahon, in 2000 AD No. 336, 1983)
    - "The Bride of Crom" (with Massimo Belardinelli, in 2000 AD #337–342, 1983)
    - "The Creeping Death" (with Massimo Belardinelli, in 2000 AD No. 343, 1983)
    - "The Bull Dance" (with Massimo Belardinelli, in 2000 AD No. 344, 1983)
    - "Heroes' Blood" (with Mike McMahon, in 2000 AD #345–347, 1983)
    - "The Shoggey Beast" (with Mike McMahon, in 2000 AD #348–351, 1983–1984)
    - "Sky Chariots" (with Mike McMahon, in 2000 AD #352–360, 1984)
    - "The Origins" (two-page text article, 2000 AD No. 352, 1984)
  - Time Killer (2007, ISBN 1-905437-21-8):
    - "Dragonheist" (with Massimo Belardinelli, in 2000 AD #361–367, 1984)
    - "The Time Killer" (with Glenn Fabry, David Pugh and Bryan Talbot, in 2000 AD #411–428 and 431–434, 1985)
  - Slaine the King (2008, ISBN 1-905437-66-8):
    - "The Tomb of Terror" (with Glenn Fabry and David Pugh, in 2000 AD #447–461, December 1985 – March 1986)
    - "Spoils of Annwn" (with Mike Collins and Mark Farmer, in 2000 AD #493–499, October–December 1986)
    - "Sláine the King" (with Glenn Fabry, in 2000 AD #500–508 and 517–519, December 1986 – April 1987)
    - "The Killing Field" (written by Angela Kincaid, with Glenn Fabry, in 2000 AD No. 582, July 1988)
    - "Slaine the Mini-Series" (with Glenn Fabry, in 2000 AD #589–591, August–September 1988)
  - The Horned God (2008, ISBN 1-905437-73-0):
    - "The Horned God, Book I" (with Simon Bisley, in 2000 AD #626–635, May–July 1989)
    - "The Horned God, Book II" (with Simon Bisley, in 2000 AD #650–656 and 662–664, October 1989 – February 1990)
    - "The Horned God, Book III" (with Simon Bisley, in 2000 AD #688–698, July–September 1990)
  - Demon Killer (2010, ISBN 1-906735-41-7):
    - "The High King" (with Glenn Fabry, in 2000 AD Yearbook, September 1992)
    - "The Return of the High King" (by Dermot Power, Poster Prog Slaine 1, January 1993)
    - "Jealousy of Niamh" (with Greg Staples, in 2000 AD #850–851, August–September 1993)
    - "Demon Killer" (with Glenn Fabry and Dermot Power, in 2000 AD #852–859, September–October 1993)
    - "Queen of Witches" (with Dermot Power, in 2000 AD #889–896, May–July 1994)
  - Lord of Misrule (2011, ISBN 1-907519-85-8):
    - "Name of the Sword" (with Greg Staples, in 2000 AD #950–956, July–September 1995)
    - "Lord of Misrule" (with Clint Langley, in 2000 AD #958–963, September–October 1995, #995–998, June 1996)
    - "Bowels of Hell" (with Jim Murray, in 2000 AD #1000, July 1996)
  - "Treasures of Britain" (2012, ISBN 1-907992-97-9):
    - "Treasures of Britain" (with Dermot Power, in 2000 AD #1001–1010, July–September 1996, #1024–1031, January–February 1997)
    - "The Cloak of Fear" (with Steve Tappin, in 2000 AD #1011–1012, October 1996)
  - The Grail War (2013, ISBN 1781081123):
    - "The Demon Hitchhiker" (with Steve Tappin, in 2000 AD #1032, March 1997)
    - "King of Hearts" (with Nick Percival, in 2000 AD #1033–1039, March–April 1997)
    - "The Grail War" (with Steve Tappin, in 2000 AD #1040–1049, April–July 1997)
    - "Secret of the Grail" (with Steve Tappin, in 2000 AD #1090–1099, April–June 1998)
    - "The Battle of Clontarf" (with Massimo Belardinelli, in 2000 AD Annual, 1985)
  - Lord of the Beasts (2014):
    - "Lord of the Beasts" (with Rafael Garres, in 2000 AD #1100, June 1998)
    - "Kai" (with Paul Staples, in 2000 AD #1104–1107, July–August 1998)
    - "The Banishing" (with Wayne Reynolds, in 2000 AD #1108–1109, August 1998)
    - "The Triple Death" (with Wayne Reynolds, in 2000 AD #1111, September 1998)
    - "The Swan Children" (with Siku, in 2000 AD #1112–1114, September–October 1998)
    - "Macha" (with Paul Staples, in 2000 AD #1115–1118, October–November 1998)
    - "Beyond" (with Greg Staples, in 2000 AD Prog 2000, December 1999)
    - "The Secret Commonwealth" (with David Bircham, in 2000 AD #1183–1199, March–June 2000)
    - "The Arrow of God" (with Steve Parkhouse, in 2000 AD Annual, 1989)
  - The Books of Invasions: Moloch and Golamh (2006, ISBN 1-904265-82-0):
    - "The Books of Invasions I: Moloch" (in 2000 AD Prog 2003 and #1322–1326, December 2002 – February 2003)
    - "The Books of Invasions II: Golamh" (in 2000 AD #1350–1355, July–August 2003)
  - The Books of Invasions: Scota and Tara (2006, ISBN 1-904265-92-8):
    - "The Books of Invasions III: Scota" (in 2000 AD Prog 2004 and #1371–1376, December 2003 – February 2004)
    - "The Books of Invasions IV: Tara" (in 2000 AD Prog 2005 and #1420–1425, December 2004 – February 2005)
  - The Books of Invasions: Odacon (July 2007, ISBN 1-904265-92-8):
    - "The Books of Invasions V: Odacon" (in 2000 AD #1436–1442, April–June 2005)
    - "Carnival" (in 2000 AD Prog 2006 and #1469–1475, December 2005 – February 2006)
  - Slaine the Wanderer (2011, ISBN 978-1-907992-24-7):
    - "The Gong Beater" (with Clint Langley, in 2000 AD #1635–1638, May–June 2009)
    - "The Amber Smuggler" (with Clint Langley, in 2000 AD #1662–1665, November–December 2009)
    - "The Exorcist" (with Clint Langley, in 2000 AD, #1709–1712, November 2010)
    - "The Mercenary" (with Clint Langley, in 2000 AD, #1713–1714 and Prog 2011, November–December 2010)
  - The Book of Scars (2013, ISBN 978-1781081761):
    - "The Book of Scars" (with Clint Langley, Mike McMahon, Glenn Fabry, Simon Bisley, in 2000 AD, #1844-1849, August 2013)
  - The Brutania Chronicles: A Simple Killing (2015, ISBN 978-1781083352):
    - "The Brutania Chronicles: A Simple Killing" (with Simon Davis, in 2000 AD, #1874–1886, 2014)
  - The Brutania Chronicles: Primordial (2016, ISBN 978-1781084724):
    - "The Brutania Chronicles: Primordial" (with Simon Davis, in 2000 AD, #1924–1936, 2015)
  - The Brutania Chronicles: Psychopomp (2017, ISBN 978-1781085462):
    - "The Brutania Chronicles: Psychopomp" (with Simon Davis, in 2000 AD, #1979-1988, 2016)
    - "Red Branch" (with Simon Davis, in 2000 AD 40th Anniversary Special, 2017)
  - The Brutania Chronicles: Archon (2018, ISBN 978-1781086322):
    - "The Brutania Chronicles: Archon" (with Simon Davis, in 2000 AD, #2050–2060, 2017)
  - Dragontamer (2021, ISBN 978-1781089538):
    - "Dragontamer" (with Leonardo Manco, in 2000 AD #2212–2219, 2221, 2228; 2020–2021)
    - "The Bogatyr" (with Chris Weston, in 2000 AD #2111, 2018)
    - "The Lord Weird Slough Feg: Lord of the Hunt" (with Kyle Hotz, in 2000 AD Villains Special, 2019)

== Characters ==
=== Main characters ===
- Sláine MacRoth – Mighty black-haired Irish warrior exiled from the Sessair tribe for having an affair with the chief's fiancée Niamh. He loves fighting and often beats up Ukko. His favoured weapon is the stone axe Brainbiter and he first experienced the Warp Spasm as a child.
- Ukko – Sláine's dwarf sidekick and chronicler, named after the Finnish storm-god Ukko. He is lecherous and greedy; like most fantasy dwarves he loves gold and has a business mind centuries ahead of the human characters. When Sláine becomes king, Ukko is appointed his "Royal Parasite" – his jester.
- Nest – A Celtic Briton Druidess who urges Ukko to record Sláine's deeds. She frequently quarrels with Ukko, but it is hinted there may be some mutual attraction between them. Named after the Welsh princess Nest ferch Rhys.
- Niamh – Slaine's strong-willed wife. She is very assertive, and prone to anger and jealousy, often beating up Sláine's other wives and concubines

=== Supporting characters ===
- Danu – Goddess of the earth who provides Slaine with guidance. Originally earth was ruled by female goddesses but the druids suppressed them and replaced them with male counterparts
- Cathbad – Chief druid who wears a horse skull and has a strong dislike of Ukko. He is a short old man with a moustache and bald head, save for a single tuft of hair.
- Myrddin – Half-Cythron Atlantean survivor and high-level magus analogous to Merlin. His fortress is located in modern-day Wales.
- Murdach – Time-displaced son of Brian Boru.
- Cador (original) – An ancient Druid who built the forcefield that protects Myrddin's territory from the Cythrons.
- Kai – Sláine's son. Sláine wanted him to be a warrior but Niamh had him train as a druid. He later becomes a travelling acrobat.
- King Rudraige mac Dela – Ruler of the city of Gorlias and guardian of the Silver Sword of the Moon. His hand is bitten off by Avagddu and replaced with a metal prosthesis, preventing him from becoming High King. He was married to Niamh for a year, but leaves her for a warrior resembling Arnold Schwarzenegger's Conan.
- King Gann mac Dela – Ruler of Finias and wielder of the Spear of the Flaming Sun. To celebrate the defeat of the Fomorians Gann was sacrificed and eaten by the tribe
- King Sengann mac Dela – Mad ruler of Falias, a moon-worshipping society. His people, the black-skinned Tribe of the Shadows, were responsible for exterminating the Neanderthal-like beaver folk and stealing the Stone of Destiny.
- Mogrooth – Fearsome Atlantean dragon rider and gladiator with enlarged, sharpened fangs. Despises Ukko for his thievery.
- Tlachtga – Mogrooth's daughter and one of Myrddin's best warriors. She is badly disfigured by the Great Worm's breath, which aged part of her face.

=== Villains ===
- The Lord Weird Slough Feg – Ancient, rotting leader of the Drunes and the original Horned God who refused to die when his seven-year reign was over. He ate the Time Worm's eggs to prolong his life and resides at the drune capital Carnac where he spends his time making cave paintings.
- Medb/Megrim – Drune priestess saved by Slaine from human sacrifice. It is revealed she wanted to be sacrificed to the worm-god Crom to become a goddess.
- Catha, Fea, and Nemon – Three Drune priestesses who serve as Slough Feg's lieutenants.
- Melga – Slough Feg's general, oversaw the construction of the standing stones at Carnac.
- Balor – Leader of the Fomorians. He has only one eye, which is capable of destroying anything he stares at.
- Moloch – Balor's cruel lieutenant, who wields six swords in battle. Based on the pagan god Molech. Assumes command of the Fomorians when Balor is killed, and brutally murders Niamh.
- Odacon – Assumes control of the Fomorians after Moloch.
- Sethor – Member of Sessair tribal council who succeeded Sláine as High King. He later betrays the Celts to the Fomorians and becomes Odacon's golamh.
- Avagddu – The demon son of the earth goddess, and the foulest, stupidest demon ever to have lived. Medb summoned him to kill Niamh but he ended up eating himself.
- Elfric – Three-eyed blue skinned demon capable of time travel. He led both the Roman invasion of Britain and the Viking invasion of Ireland. He appears to be homosexual or bisexual as he refers to his relationship with Nero and was reluctant to rape Boudicca's daughters, only doing so out of spite.
- Quagslime – Fomorian tax collector who cuts off the noses of tax-dodgers.
- Nudd – Ogre serving as assistant jailer. Slaine bashed out his brains when Nudd tried to kill him.
- Domnall – A dwarf blacksmith who murdered warriors and tempered his weapons in their blood. He is killed with his own sword by Slaine.
- Slough Throt – A drune lord who successfully sheds his rotting skin to earn the rank of Slough. He hired Sláine as a bodyguard to escape Slough Feg and deliver the plans for Ragnarok to the Druids of Glastonbury.
- Cador (doppelganger) – Cador is killed at some unspecified point in Time Killers and replaced by a disguised Slough Feg, who then hatches stored Time Worm eggs allowing Time Worms to overrun Myrddin's fortress.
- Robym – An evil dwarf who acts as a servant to Medb
- Skuld the Demented, Hadric Hissing-blade, and Thorgrim Ironjaw – Three Viking pirate captains sent by Slough Feg to attack Slough Throt's flying longship.
- Broog – Torturer employed by the Inquisition, actually a cult worshipping the blood god Iahu.
- Gael – Leader of the tribe of wandering Atlantean refugees who ally themselves with Odacon's fomorians. Serves as Odacon's first host (golamh). Gives his name to the 'gaelic' peoples.
- Scota – Egyptian princess who eloped with Gael's Atlanteans. Gives her name to the Scottish race.
- Mordred – Son of King Arthur and Morgana, who betrays and murders his father for converting to Christianity and renouncing the Goddess, but is mortally wounded with Excalibur.
- Hengwolf – Anglo-Saxon warlord and worshipper of Odin allied to Mordred, who transforms into the white dragon of the Saxons and battles Sláine
- Guledig – Cythron leader who orchestrated Arthur's downfall. He is worshipped by the Celts as a statue of a golden child called the Mabon, but his real form is a green disembodied head with three arms
- Leystar – Evil Cathar magician who wears a bird mask and can transform himself into a phoenix.
- Sir Brian – Master of the Knights Templar who becomes possessed by a Cyth demon.

=== Historical and mythical characters ===
- Boudicca – Queen of the Iceni, based on the historical hero of the same name
- William Wallace – Scottish rebel fighting against the English invaders
- Robert the Bruce – Assumes command of the Scottish rebels after Wallace is executed.
- Simon de Montfort – Fanatical crusader knight seeking to destroy the Cathars, and is revealed to be a reincarnation of Niamh.
- Esclarmonde de Foix – Leader of the Cathars, and one of the few remaining pagan witches in France.
- St Patrick – A priest Sláine encounters in Demon Killer. He tries to convert Sláine to Christianity before threatening him with damnation. Ukko is interested in his valuable gold cross.
- Robin Hood – Saxon outlaw and leader of the last pagan coven, tortured to death by the fanatical Sheriff of Nottingham. Sláine replaces Robin as the Lord of Misrule.
- King Arthur – Legendary British ruler killed by Morded and Hengwolf. Sláine takes Arthur's place and breaks the curse over the Ancient Britons.
- Sir Lancelot – Arthur's former champion, now living as a monk to atone for his betrayal.
- Guinevere – Arthur's wife who is possessed by a Cythron priestess.

=== Celts ===
- Roth Bellyshaker – Sláine's father. Once a proud warrior, he becomes an obese braggart. He is killed by Slough Feg when attempting to avenge Slaine's apparent death
- Macha – Sláine's mother. Roth was responsible for her death when he bragged she could outrun the king's chariot and made her enter the race.
- Mongan Axe-head – Sláine's foster-father who headbutts enemies with his spiked helmet
- King Ragnall – Sláine's foster-brother who tries to appease the Fomorians with tributes. When he is publicly humiliated by Balor, Ragnall commits ritual suicide with assistance from Cathbad so Sláine can replace him as king of the Sessair.
- King Grudnew – Ragnall's predecessor and husband of Niamh who ran over Sláine's mother with his chariot. He was thrown off a cliff by his own tribe for failing to prevent a famine.
- Blind Bran – An old beggar and ally of Sláine who fought alongside him during his time as a mercenary.
- Cuan – A warrior sacrificed by the druid priestesses to enable them to foretell the future. His torture and disembowelment is similar to the injuries inflicted on Lindow Man.
- Madad the Quarrelsome – A warrior who insults Sláine and questions his right to be king. His nose is chewed off in a fight.
- Gurg of the Three Fingers – Sláine's charioteer, recognisable by his three-horned helmet.
- Dundan Skullsmasher – A Sessair warrior killed in a fight for the best cuts of meat
- Gwalchazad the Ram – The warrior who challenges Dundan Skullsmasher for the hero's portion
- Fergus the Brave – A warrior a bored Sláine accuses of cowardice
- Diarmid the Foul-Tempered – Sláine claims to have slept with his wife and daughter, only for Diarmid to offer his attractive sister.
- Conal the Handsome – A warrior Sláine punches in the face in an attempt to start a fight. Despite losing all his teeth, Conal is more concerned about the damage to Sláine's hand.
- Madog Stag-shanks – Village headman who shelters Sláine in return for his mammoth.
- Caw Sheaf-hair – Madog's son, who is murdered by Slough Throt's skull-swords
- Cullen of the wide mouth – Classmate jealous of the young Sláine's skill in battle. Tries to murder Sláine but is killed with a gae bulga.
- Conn of the Hundred Battles – Red Branch warrior and father of Cullen, who tries to avenge his son's death but is also killed by Sláine.

=== Others ===
- Blathnaid – Former lover of Sláine, who used to rob horse-drawn carriages and was a regular runaway bride. Later on after they had parted ways, she was devoured by a giant serpent summoned from hel by the Drunes, after which it was able to take her shape.
- Lauretta – French female mercenary who becomes Sláine's lover
- Guild Master – An old dwarf who invites Ukko to join the Guild of Cutpurses, Varlets and Mendicants
- Kyot – A medieval troubadour who allies with Sláine.
- Medrawd – Farmer who lives alone with his mother, who is actually a shape-shifting shoggey beast responsible for devouring many passing travellers.
- Mor Ronne the Dung Collector – One of the few dwarves more repulsive than Ukko. Nest has to sleep with him as part of her initiation ceremony
- White Tusk – King of the Orcs with the head of a Wild boar who presides over a court of fools. Ukko steals his tusk for a potion to save King Arthur.
- The Knucker – An ageing dragon used as aerial transport by Sláine
- Nidhug – A fierce dragon that killed Tlachtga in Grimnismal's tomb.
- Pluke – A light El who helps Sláine rescue Nest and Myrddin from the Cythrons

== In other media ==
Tabletop miniature wargames

- Sláine (by Warlord Games)

=== Video games ===
- Sláine, the Celtic Barbarian (by Creative Reality, Amstrad CPC, C64 and ZX Spectrum graphic adventure)

=== Role-playing games ===
2000 AD RPG appearances:

- Tomb of Terror (2000 AD Progs 447–461, illustrated by Glen Fabry)

Solo RPG appearances:

- Cauldron of Blood (Dice Man No. 1, illustrated by David Lloyd).
- Dragoncorpse (Dice Man No. 2, illustrated by Nik Williams).
- The Ring of Danu (Dice Man No. 4, illustrated by Mike Collins & Mark Farmer).
- The Invulnerable King (by Ian Sturrock, Mongoose Publishing)
- Sláine: The Roleplaying Game of Celtic Heroes (by Ian Sturrock, Mongoose Publishing)
- Sláine (2007, Mongoose Publishing, published under Issaries, Inc. license with the RuneQuest game system)

=== Novels ===
The first Sláine novel was released at the end of 2006:

- Sláine: Sláine the Exile (Steven Savile, Black Flame, December 2006, ISBN 1-84416-387-3)
- Sláine: Slaine the Defiler (Steven Savile, Black Flame, September 2007, ISBN 1-84416-493-4)

=== Music ===
- The metal band Slough Feg (originally named The Lord Weird Slough Feg) named themselves after the character of the same name.
