= Dela =

Dela may refer to:

== People ==
- Dela, Count of Empúries (died c. 894), count of Empúries
- Dela (footballer) (born 1999), Adrián de la Fuente, Spanish footballer
- Dela Smith, headteacher at Beaumont Hill Technology College
- Dela Yampolsky (born 1988), Israeli-Nigerian football player

== Places ==
- Dela, Ethiopia
- Dela, Iran
- Dela, Oklahoma
- Dela, Raebareli, Uttar Pradesh, India
- DeLaveaga Disc Golf Course, commonly known as "DeLa"

== Other ==
- "Dela" (song), a song by Johnny Clegg & Savuka's from the 1989 album Cruel, Crazy Beautiful World
- dela, a Japanese idol group

== See also ==
- Dela Cruz (disambiguation)
- Dela Rosa (disambiguation)
- Dela-Oenale language
- mac Dela, an Irish surname
- Della (disambiguation)
