= Fiacha Cennfinnán =

Ancient Irish king

In Irish mythology Fiacha Cennfinnán (modern spelling: Fiacha Ceannfhionnán meaning "Fiacha [of the] little white head"), son of Starn, son of Rudraige, of the Fir Bolg, became High King of Ireland when he overthrew his great-uncle Sengann.

He ruled for five years, until he was overthrown by Rinnal, son of Genann.

The Milesian king Fíachu Findoilches is sometimes known by the same name.

| Preceded by Sengann (2) | High King of Ireland; AFM 1922–1917 BC; FFE 1502–1497 BC | Succeeded by Rinnal |

== Primary sources ==
- Lebor Gabála Érenn
- Annals of the Four Masters
- Seathrún Céitinn's Foras Feasa ar Érinn
