= Fodbgen =

Legendary High King of Ireland

In Irish mythology Fodbgen or Odbgen (modern spelling: Foidhbhgen - "the despoiler") son of Sengann of the Fir Bolg became High King of Ireland when he overthrew his cousin Rinnal son of Genann. It is said that before his time there were no knots (Old Irish odb) in trees.

He ruled for four years until he was overthrown by Eochaid mac Eirc, Rinnal's grandson.

Preceded by Rinnal	High King of Ireland; AFM 1911–1907 BC; FFE 1491–1487 BC	Succeeded by Eochaid mac Eirc

== Primary sources ==
- Lebor Gabála Érenn
- Annals of the Four Masters
- Seathrún Céitinn's Foras Feasa ar Érinn
