= Beltra =

Beltra Béal Trá
- Village
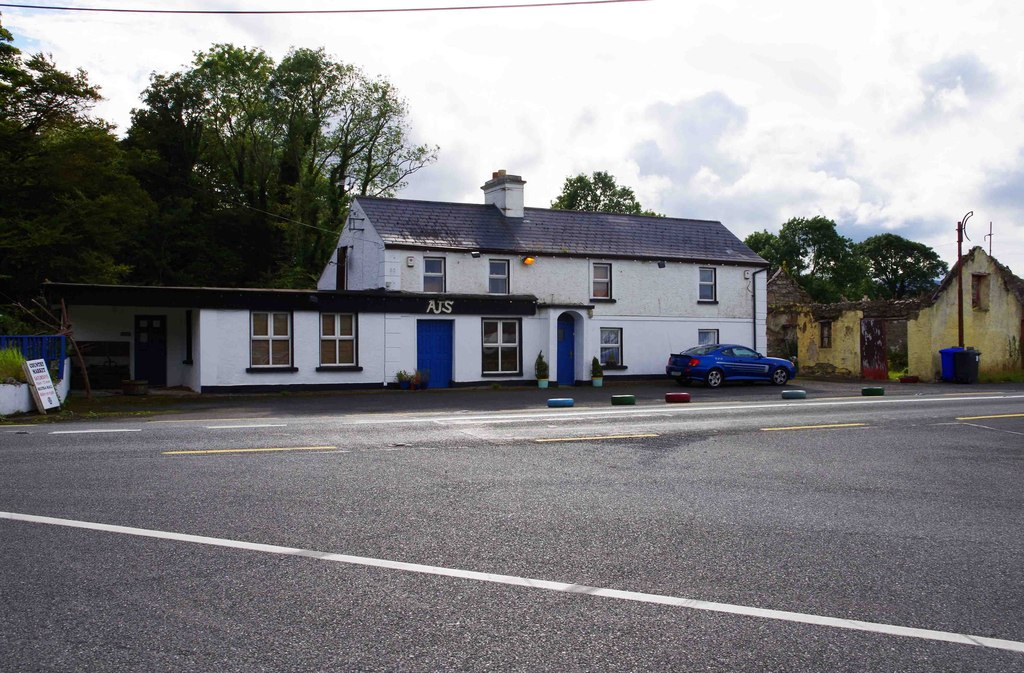
- AJ's pub in Beltra

- Location in Ireland
- Coordinates: 54°13′10″N 8°37′03″W
- Country: Ireland
- Province: Connacht
- County: County Sligo
- Elevation: 51 m (167 ft)
- Time zone: UTC+0 (WET)
  - Summer (DST): UTC-1 (IST (WEST))
- Irish Grid Reference: G597302

Beltra (Irish: Béal Trá, meaning 'strand mouth') is a village in County Sligo, Ireland. Beltra is situated between the Ox Mountains and the Atlantic Ocean. There is a public house named AJ's situated near Beltra woods and Beltra Post Office. Farming, haulage, and construction are the main sources of employment in Beltra. Beltra has an annual agricultural show each September.

== History ==
The village takes its name from the beach nearby along the western shore of Ballysadare bay. There are several old names for the strand, the most common being Trá Eóchaille, Strand of the Yew Wood, or after Eochaille the wright. Trá Ruis Airgid, Strand of Red Silver, perhaps because of the silver and lead mine at Abbeytown near Ballysadare. The mine contains the mineral pyrargyrite an ore also known as "dark red silver" or "ruby silver". Other names are Trá Mná Mairbe (Strand of the Dead Women) and Trá an Cháirn (Strand of the Cairn).

In Irish mythology, the Firbolg King Eochaid mac Eirc met his death here after the first Battle of Moytura. The king was buried here in a cairn that existed on the strand known as "the stone-heap of the Strand of Eothail". Also killed and buried here were the three sons of Nemed, i.e., Cesarb, Luamh, and Luachra, leaders of the pursuing Tuatha de Danann. They were interred at the west end of the strand, at a place since called Leca Mic Nemed, or the grave-slab of the sons of Nemed.

In the 19th century, there was a constabulary barracks in the village. A local hero, Kieran Dowd, died while cutting down a tree in beltra wood and is now remembered by the name Woody. A local villager called Stephen Kilcullen also died whilst strimming in the wood and is known by locals as the strimmer king,

A Martian crater, the Beltra crater is named after the village.

== See also ==
- List of towns in the Republic of Ireland
