= Éire =

Irish name for Ireland

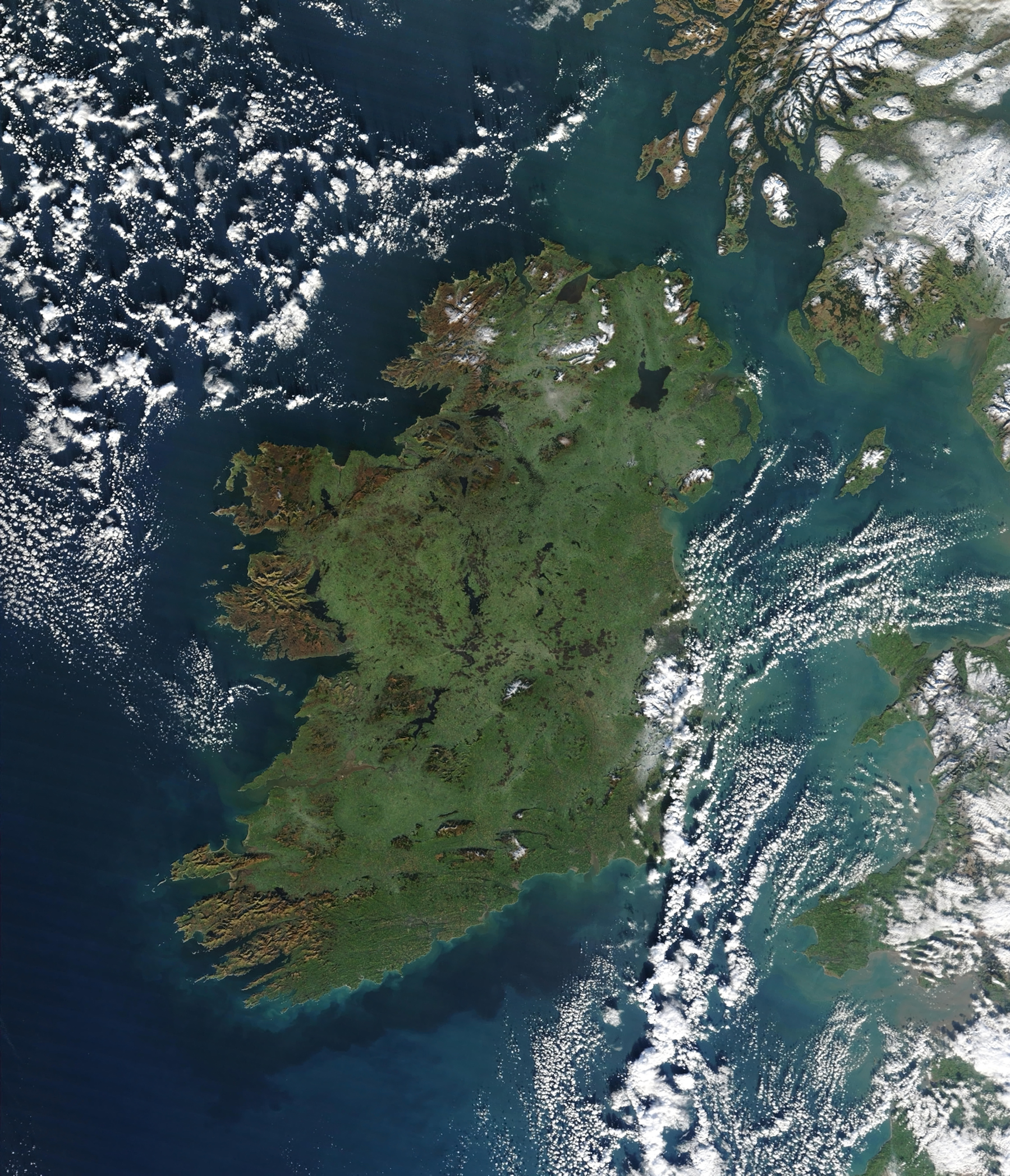
True-colour satellite image of Ireland, known in Irish as Éire.

Éire (English: /ˈɛərə/, Irish: [ˈeːɾʲə]) is the Irish language name for "Ireland". Like its English counterpart, the term Éire is used for both the island of Ireland and the Republic of Ireland, the sovereign state that governs 85% of the island's landmass. The latter is distinct from Northern Ireland (Tuaisceart Éireann in the Irish language), which covers the remainder of the northeast of the island. The same name is also sometimes used in English, with or without the síneadh fada accent, though such use is considered controversial.

== Etymology ==
The modern Irish Éire evolved from the Old Irish word Ériu, which was the name of Ireland and of a Gaelic goddess. Ériu is generally believed to have been the matron goddess of Ireland, a goddess of sovereignty, or simply a goddess of the land. Ériu has been derived from reconstructed Archaic Irish *Īweriū, and further from the Proto-Celtic *Φīwerjon- (nominative singular Φīwerjū). This suggests descent from the Proto-Indo-European *piHwerjon- ("fertile land" or "abundant land"), from the adjective *piHwer- ("fat") – cognate with Ancient Greek píeira and Sanskrit pīvarī, ("fat, full, abounding"). The Archaic Irish form was borrowed into Greek. During his exploration of northwest Europe (circa 320 BC), Pytheas of Massilia called the island Ierne (written Ἰέρνη). The Pseudo-Aristotelian text On the Universe (393b) has:

Ἐν τούτῳ γε μὴν νῆσοι μέγισται τυγχάνουσιν οὖσαι δύο, Βρεττανικαὶ λεγόμεναι, Ἀλβίων καὶ Ἰέρνη.

Translation: There are two very large islands in it, called the British Isles, Albion and Ierne. (modern Great Britain and Ireland).

In his book Geographia (c. 150 AD), Claudius Ptolemaeus called the island Iouernia (written Ἰουερνία; ou represented /w/) and named a tribal group called the (Ἰούερνοι, Iouernoi or Iverni who lived in the southwest. This was borrowed into Latin as Hibernia.

The evolution of the word would follow as such:

- Proto-Celtic *Φīwerjon- (nominative singular *Φīwerjū)
  - Archaic Irish *Īweriū
    - Old Irish Ériu
      - Modern Irish Éire

An Old Irish by-form of this placename was íriu, meaning "land, earth". In Irish mythology, Íth is the first of the Milesians (Irish) to see Ireland from Iberia. Later, he is the first to step ashore and praises the island's abundance, saying to the Tuatha Dé Danann: "You dwell in a good land. Abundant are its mast and honey and wheat and fish".

A 19th-century proposal, which does not follow modern standards of etymology, derives the name from Scottish Gaelic: ì (island) + thiar (west) + fónn (land), which together give ì-iar-fhónn, or "westland isle". The etymology fails in that tiar (the historical form) has no *téir forms which would allow the development of the *é of Éire; moreover, Old Irish í ("island") was a late loanword from Old Norse ey ("island"), and so did not exist in prehistoric Ireland.

=== Difference between Éire and Erin ===
While Éire is simply the name for the island of Ireland in the Irish language, and sometimes used in English, Erin is a common poetic name for Ireland, as in Erin go bragh. The distinction between the two is one of the differences between cases of nouns in Irish. Éire is the nominative case, the case that is used for nouns that are the subject of a sentence, i.e., the noun that is doing something. Erin derives from Éirinn, the Irish dative case of Éire, which has replaced the nominative case in Déise Irish and some non-standard sub-dialects elsewhere, in Scottish Gaelic (where the usual word for Ireland is Èirinn) and Manx (like Irish and Scottish Gaelic, a Goidelic Celtic language), where the word is spelled "Nerin," with the initial n- probably representing a fossilisation of the preposition in/an "in" (cf. Irish in Éirinn, Scottish an Èirinn/ann an Èirinn "in Ireland"). The genitive case, Éireann (e.g. stair na hÉireann "the history of Ireland, Ireland's history"), is found in the Gaelic forms of the titles of companies and institutions in Ireland e.g. Iarnród Éireann (Irish Rail), Dáil Éireann (Irish Parliament), Poblacht na hÉireann (The Republic of Ireland) or Tuaisceart Éireann (Northern Ireland).

== As a state name ==
Ireland uses Éire as the country name on both its postage stamps and coinage.

Article 4 of the Irish constitution adopted in 1937 by the government under Éamon de Valera states "Éire is the name of the state, or in the English language, Ireland". The Constitution's English-language preamble also describes the population as "We, the people of Éire". Despite the fact that Article 8 designated Irish as the "national" and "first official" language, Éire has to some extent passed out of everyday conversation and literature, and the state is referred to as Ireland or its equivalent in all other languages. The name "Éire" has been used on Irish postage stamps since 1922; on all Irish coinage (including Irish euro coins); and together with "Ireland" on passports and other official state documents issued since 1937. "Éire" is used on the seal of the President of Ireland.

Initially, after 1937, the United Kingdom insisted on using only the name "Eire" and refused to accept the name "Ireland". It adopted the Eire (Confirmation of Agreements) Act 1938, putting in law that position. At the 1948 Summer Olympics in London, the organisers insisted that the Irish team march under the banner "Eire" notwithstanding that every other team was marching according to what their name was in English. The UK Government generally avoided all reference to "Ireland" in connection with the state and used what Senator Thomas O'Connell described as "sneering titles such as Eirish". However, the term "Eirish" was also used by some writers in the US, who referred to "the Eirish people". Using the genitive form Éireann as an adjective, the UK media would refer to "Eireann Ministers" and the "Eireann Army". The Ireland Act 1949 changed this to "Republic of Ireland". It was not until after the 1998 Good Friday Agreement that the UK government accepted the preferred name of simply "Ireland", at the same time as the Republic of Ireland dropped its territorial claim over Northern Ireland.

Before the 1937 Constitution, "Saorstát Éireann" (the Irish name of the Irish Free State) was generally used.

During the Emergency (as World War II was known), Irish ships had "EIRE" (and the Irish tricolour) painted large on their sides and deck, to identify them as neutrals.

In the 1947 Sinn Féin Funds case, a co-defendant was cited as "the Attorney General of Eire" in the High and Supreme Court cases, and there were similar cases where "Eire" was used in the late 1940s as a descriptor of the state in English.

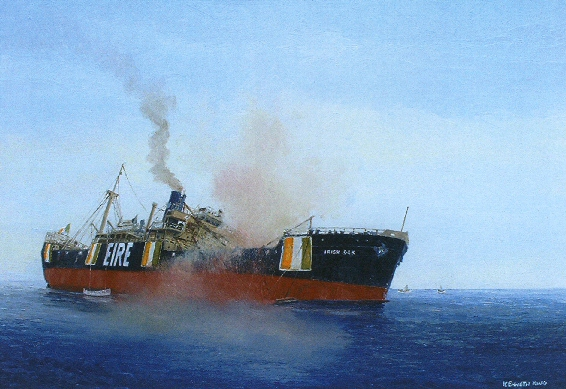
Irish Oak torpedoed mid-Atlantic, oil by Kenneth King, showing "EIRE" prominently. (National Maritime Museum of Ireland)

In 1922–1938, the international plate on Irish cars was "SE". From 1938 to 1962, it was marked "EIR", short for Éire. Bernard Commons, a Clann na Talmhan TD, suggested to the Dáil in 1950 that the Government examine "the tourist identification plate bearing the letters EIR ... with a view to the adoption of identification letters more readily associated with this country by foreigners". "EIR" was indicated in the Road Traffic (Third Party Risks) (Visiting Motorists) Regulations 1952 and 1958. The Mechanically Propelled Vehicles (International Circulation) Order 1961 specified EIR but also permitted IRL. and by 1962 "IRL" had been adopted.

Under the 1947 Convention Irish-registered aircraft have carried a registration mark starting "EI" for Éire.

From January 2007, the Irish Government nameplates at meetings of the European Union have borne both Éire and Ireland, following the adoption of Irish as a working language of the European Union.

== Spelling Eire rather than Éire ==
English rarely uses diacritics for English words, and often omits them from written loanwords from any source language; the acute accent is often omitted when ÉIRE is written in English—in that context, the omission or expression is regarded by non-Irish people as a negligible variation, reflecting two accepted spellings without further implication, in the same way as Mexico and México are seen as being the same. But for an Irish speaker, the diacritic changes the pronunciation.

In 1938, the British government provided in the Eire (Confirmation of Agreements) Act 1938 that British legislation would henceforth refer to the Irish Free State as "Eire" (but not as "Ireland"). This was altered by the Ireland Act 1949, where the English-law name of the state was changed to "Republic of Ireland". The 1938 Act was repealed in 1981, and in 1996 a British journalist described Eire as "now an oddity rarely used, an out-of-date reference".

Within Ireland, however, the spelling "Eire" was incorrect. When Irish language texts were printed in Gaelic type, both capital and lower-case letters were printed with diacritics (written accents). From the later 1940s, in conjunction with other reforms, printing switched to the same Latin alphabet used in English. There was some uncertainty about whether the síneadh fada (acute accent) should be written on upper-case letters. While it was preserved in all-Irish texts, it was often omitted when short fragments of Irish appeared alone or in English texts. Noel Davern asked in the Dáil in 1974 why Irish stamps had EIRE rather than ÉIRE. The reply from the Minister for Posts and Telegraphs was:

The accent has been omitted on most Irish stamps issued over the past ten years in the interests of artistic balance and in accordance with a common practice in the printing of Irish in Roman script for display purposes. This is a prevailing typographical convention and is common to several European languages, including French.

Davern considered EIRE to be worse than a misspelling, because eire is a word in its own right, meaning "a burden, load or encumbrance". The minister stated, "The word on the stamp ... does not mean 'eire' and it is not understood to mean 'eire' by anybody except Davern." Stamps later used a Gaelic type with the accent preserved.

== Other uses ==
Éire has been incorporated into the names of Irish commercial and social entities, such as Eir (formerly Eircom and Telecom Éireann) and its former mobile phone network, Eircell. Ireland's postal code system is known as Eircode. In 2006, the Irish electricity network was devolved to EirGrid. The company "BetEire Flow" (eFlow), named as a pun on "better", is a French consortium running the electronic tolling system at the West-Link bridge west of Dublin. According to the Dublin Companies Registration Office in 2008, over 500 company names incorporate the word Éire in some form.

== Bibliography ==
- Noel Browne, Against the Tide
- Constitution of Ireland (1937)
- Stephen Collins, The Cosgrave Legacy
- Tim Pat Coogan, De Valera (Hutchinson, 1993)
- Brian Farrell, De Valera's Constitution and Ours
- F.S.L. Lyons, Ireland since the Famine
- David Gwynn Morgan, Constitutional Law of Ireland
- Tim Murphy and Patrick Twomey (eds.) Ireland's Evolving Constitution: 1937–1997 Collected Essays (Hart, 1998) ISBN 1-901362-17-5
- Alan J. Ward, The Irish Constitutional Tradition: Responsible Government and Modern Ireland 1782–1992 (Irish Academic Press, 1994) ISBN 0-7165-2528-3
