= Rudraige =

Rudraige may refer to:

- Rudraige mac Dela, son of Dela, legendary High King of Ireland in the 16th or 20th century BC
- Rudraige mac Sithrigi, son of Sitric, legendary High King of Ireland of the 2nd or 3rd century BC
- Rudraige, in medieval Irish mythology, son of Partholón
