= Rinnal =

Irish monarch

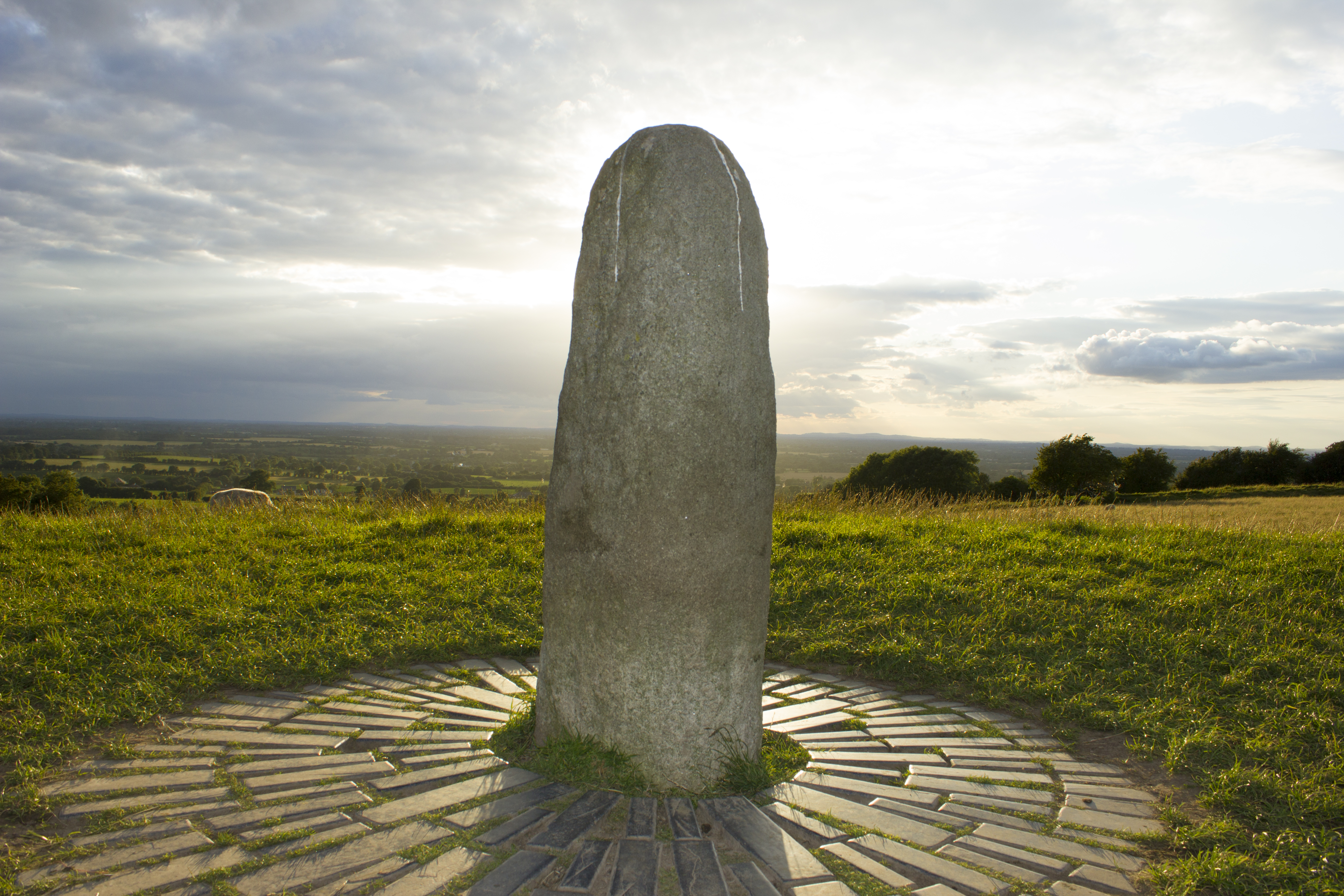
Lia Fail, Hill of Tara

In Irish mythology, Rinnal (Rindal, Rionnal, Rinnan) son of Genann of the Fir Bolg became High King of Ireland when he overthrew Fiacha Cennfinnán. He is said to have been the first king in Ireland to use spearheads (cf. Old Irish rind, rinn, (spear-)point).

He ruled for five or six years (depending on the source) before being overthrown by his cousin Fodbgen, son of Sengann.

== Primary sources ==
- Lebor Gabála Érenn
- Annals of the Four Masters
- Geoffrey Keating's Foras Feasa ar Érinn

Royal titles
Preceded by Fiacha Cennfinnán	High King of Ireland; AFM 1917–1911 BC; FFE 1497–1491 BC	Succeeded by Fodbgen
