= Sláine mac Dela =

First High King of Ireland

Sláine (Sláinge, Slánga), son of Dela, of the Fir Bolg was the legendary first High King of Ireland, who cleared the forest around Brú na Bóinne. He reportedly came ashore at Wexford Harbour at the mouth of the River Slaney.

The Fir Bolg invaded Ireland with five thousand men. Sláine and his four brothers, who were descended from one of the sons of Nemed, divided Ireland amongst themselves. Sláine, the youngest of the five, took Leinster, Gann north Munster, Sengann south Munster, Genann Connacht and Rudraige Ulster. They elected Sláine as ruler over them.

His wife was Fuad. His portion of the Fir Bolg were known as the Gailióin variant Gaileanga, named after their spears (Old Irish gáe).

Based on archaeological records of the transition between the Neolithic and the Irish Bronze Age, his reign may have lasted from between 1238 to 1237 BCE. He died at Dind Ríg in County Carlow and was buried at Slane, County Meath. He was succeeded by his brother Rudraige mac Dela.

== See also ==
- Sláine (comics) – a fantasy comic character based on Sláine mac Dela

== Primary sources ==
- Lebor Gabála Érenn §46-52
- Cath Maige Tuired §1-19
- Annals of the Four Masters M3266-M3267
- Geoffrey Keating, History of Ireland 1.8, 1.9

Royal titles
Preceded by none	High King of Ireland; AFM 1934–1933 BC; FFE 1514–1513 BC	Succeeded by Rudraige
