= Crimthann Coscrach =

Crimthann Coscrach ("the victorious"), son of Fedlimid Fortrén, son of Fergus Fortamail, was, according to medieval Irish legend and historical tradition, a High King of Ireland. He took power after killing his predecessor, Énna Aignech, and ruled for four or seven years, after which he was killed by Rudraige mac Sithrigi. The Lebor Gabála Érenn synchronises his reign with that of Ptolemy VIII Physcon in Egypt (145–116 BC). The chronology of Geoffrey Keating's Foras Feasa ar Éirinn dates his reign to 191–184 BC, that of the Annals of the Four Masters to 293–289 BC.

Preceded by Énna Aignech	High King of Ireland; LGE 2nd century BC; FFE 191–184 BC; AFM 293–289 BC	Succeeded by Rudraige mac Sithrigi
