= Óengus Tuirmech Temrach =

Irish sovereign

Óengus Tuirmech Temrach, son of Eochaid Ailtlethan, was, according to medieval Irish legend and historical tradition, a High King of Ireland. He came to power after killing his predecessor, and his father's killer, Fergus Fortamail. His sons included Énna Aignech and Fiacha Fer Mara. Énna later became High King himself and was the ancestor of Conn of the Hundred Battles and thus the Connachta and Uí Néill High Kings, while Fiacha was the ancestor of Ailill Érann and the Clanna Dedad.

Óengus is said to have fathered Fíacha on his own daughter when drunk, and to have put him in a boat, wrapped in a purple robe with a golden fringe and accompanied by treasure, and set him out to sea – hence the epithet fer mara, "man of the sea". He was found and brought up by fishermen, and became the ancestor of several High Kings of Ireland and the later Dál Riata monarchs of Scotland. The Lebor Gabála Érenn interprets his epithet as meaning "the reckoner of Tara", saying that "by him was 'reckoning' first made in Ireland". Geoffrey Keating gives his epithet as Tuirbeach, "ashamed", because of the incestuous conception of Fíacha.

He reigned for thirty or sixty years, and died at Tara, succeeded by his nephew Conall Collamrach. The Lebor Gabála synchronises his reign with that of Ptolemy VI Philometor in Egypt (180–145 BC). The chronology of Keating's Foras Feasa ar Éirinn dates his reign to 262–232 BC, that of the Annals of the Four Masters to 385–326 BC.

Preceded by Fergus Fortamail	High King of Ireland; LGE 2nd century BC; FFE 262–232 BC; AFM 385–326 BC	Succeeded by Conall Collamrach
