= Conall Collamrach =

Legendary High King of Ireland

Conall Collamrach, son of Eterscél Temrach, son of Eochaid Ailtlethan, was, according to medieval Irish legend and historical tradition, a High King of Ireland. He succeeded to the throne on the death of his uncle Óengus Tuirmech Temrach, and ruled for five years, until he was killed by Nia Segamain. The Lebor Gabála synchronises his reign with that of Ptolemy VIII Physcon in Egypt (145–116 BC). The chronology of Geoffrey Keating's Foras Feasa ar Éirinn dates his reign to 232–226 BC, that of the Annals of the Four Masters to 326–320 BC.

Preceded by Óengus Tuirmech Temrach	High King of Ireland; LGE 2nd century BC; FFE 232–226 BC; AFM 326–320 BC	Succeeded by Nia Segamain
