= Sengann =

Sengann (modern spelling: Seangann, "old-mean") is the name of two early settlers of Ireland according to Irish mythology.

- Sengann, a king of the Fomorians who was defeated, along with his brother Gann, by Nemed
- Sengann mac Dela, son of Dela of the Fir Bolg, a legendary early High King of Ireland in the 16th or 20th century BC
