= Nia Segamain =

Irish High King

Nia Segamain, son of Adamair, was, according to medieval Irish legend and historical tradition, a High King of Ireland. He took power after killing his predecessor, Conall Collamrach. Geoffrey Keating says his mother was the presumed woodland goddess Flidais of the Tuatha Dé Danann, whose magic made wild does give milk as freely as domesticated cattle during his reign. He ruled for seven years, until he was killed by Énna Aignech. The Lebor Gabála synchronises his reign with that of Ptolemy VIII Physcon in Egypt (145–116 BC). The chronology of Keating's Foras Feasa ar Éirinn dates his reign to 226–219 BC, that of the Annals of the Four Masters to 320–313 BC. His name means "sister's son or champion of Segamon", and is perhaps related to Segomo, an ancient Gaulish deity equated in Roman times with Mars and Hercules. A slightly more historical Nia Segamain occurs in early Eóganachta pedigrees, and this is sometimes interpreted as evidence for the Gaulish origins of the dynasties.

Preceded by Conall Collamrach	High King of Ireland; LGE 2nd century BC; FFE 226–219 BC; AFM 320–313 BC	Succeeded by Énna Aignech

== See also ==
- Deirgtine
- Mug Nuadat
