= Della =

Della may refer to:

- Della (name), including a list of people with the name
- Della (film), a 1964 television pilot film starring Joan Crawford
- Della (TV series), starring Della Reese
- Della (album)
- Della, Ethiopia, a town in Ethiopia

== See also ==
- Dela (disambiguation)
- Della Falls
