= Eochaid mac Eirc =

Mythological High King of Ireland

In Irish mythology Eochaid (modern spelling: Eochaidh), son of Erc, son of Rinnal, of the Fir Bolg became High King of Ireland when he overthrew Fodbgen. He was the first king to establish a system of justice in Ireland. No rain fell during his reign, only dew, and there was a harvest every year.

His wife was the Goddess Tailtiu. Eochaid named his capital after her (modern Teltown, County Meath) and held a festival there every August. He ruled for ten years, until the Fir Bolg were defeated by the Tuatha Dé Danann in the first Battle of Magh Tuiredh. During the fighting Eochaid was overcome by thirst, but the druids of the Tuatha Dé hid all sources of water from him with their magic. As he searched for water, he was found and killed by The Morrigan on the strand at Beltra County Sligo. According to tradition, he was buried under Eochy's Cairn.

| Preceded by Fodbgen | High King of Ireland; AFM 1907–1897 BC; FFE 1487–1477 BC | Succeeded by Bres |
