= Rathcroghan =

Complex of archaeological sites in Roscommon, Ireland

- Ráth Cruachan (Irish)
- Cruachan
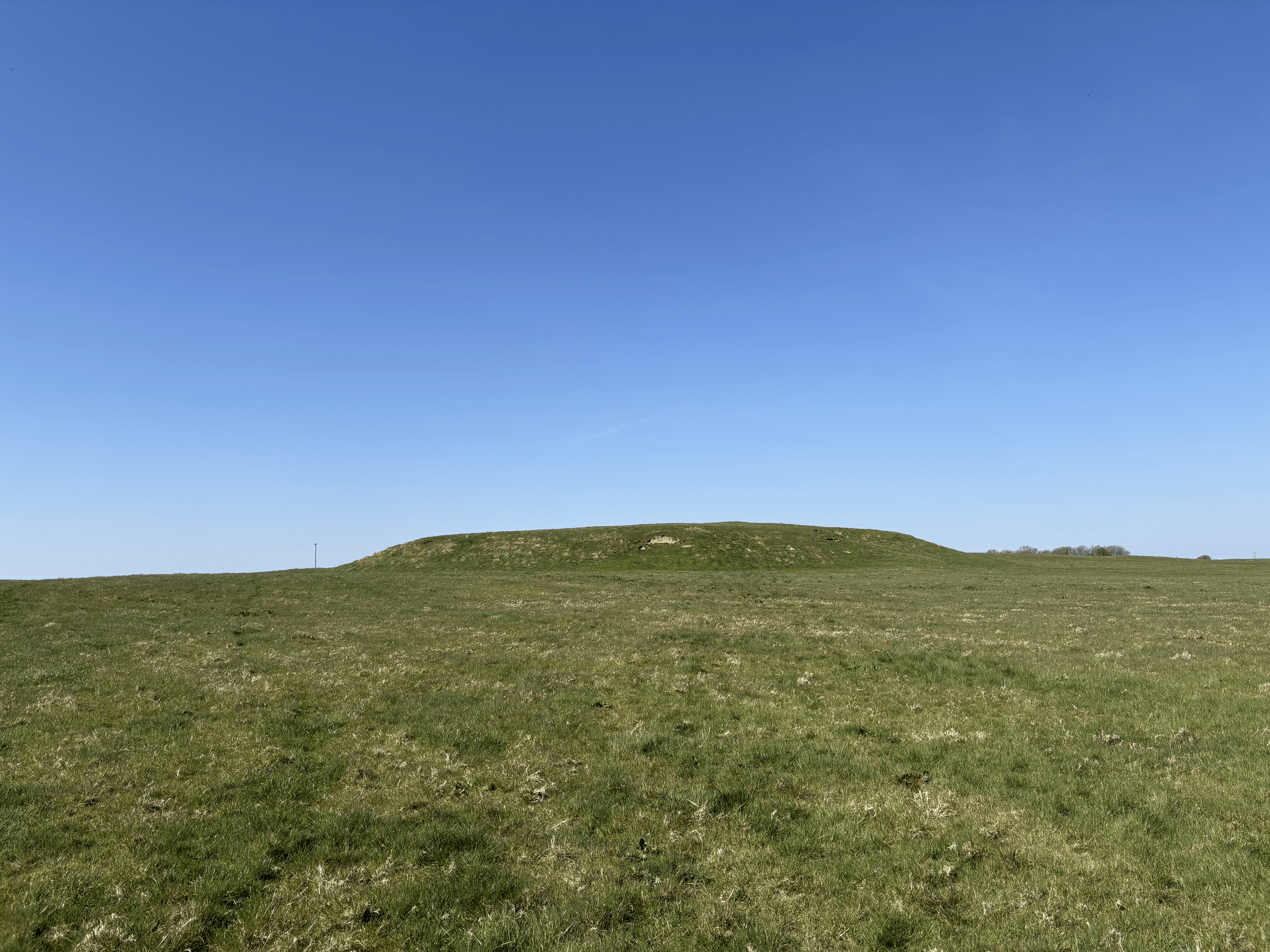
- The main mound

- Location within island of Ireland
- 53°48′07″N 8°18′14″W
- Type: Ceremonial earthworks
- Periods: Bronze Age–Iron Age
- Cultures: Gaelic
- Location: County Roscommon, Ireland

Site notes
- Elevation: 90 m (300 ft)
- Website: www.rathcroghan.ie

National monument of Ireland
- Official name: Rathcroghan
- Reference no.: 294, 473

Rathcroghan (Irish: Ráth Cruachan, meaning 'ringfort of Cruachan') is a complex of archaeological sites near Tulsk in County Roscommon, Ireland. It has been identified as the site of Cruachan or Cruachu, the traditional capital of the Connachta, the prehistoric and early medieval rulers of the kingdom of Connacht. Rathcroghan is one of the royal sites of Ireland. The ritual landscape extends over 6 square kilometres (2.3 sq mi) and consists of over 240 archaeological sites, 60 of which are protected national monuments. According to National Geographic, the site may be "Europe's largest unexcavated royal complex".

The sites range in time period of construction from the Neolithic (4000–2500 BC), the Bronze (2500–500 BC) and Iron Ages (500 BC – 400 AD), to the medieval period. These monuments include burial mounds, ringforts and medieval field boundaries, the most prominent sites being the multi-period Rathcroghan Mound, the Oweynagat cave, the Mucklaghs (a set of linear earthworks), and the Carnfree medieval complex.

There are many historic references to Rathcroghan (Ráth Crúachan) recorded in early medieval manuscripts, including the 12th-century Lebor na hUidre. Rathcroghan is recorded as the location of one of the great fairs of Ireland, as well as being one of the island's three great pagan cemeteries. It is also the location for the beginning and end of the Táin Bó Cúailnge and the royal seat of Medb, a mythical queen of Connacht.

The Cave of Cruachan, also called Oweynagat, is said in Irish mythology to be an entrance to the Otherworld, or in the modern era as one of Ireland's "Gates to Hell". The cave has associations with the festival of Samhain and is also described as the dwelling of the Morrígan, a mythical figure in early medieval Irish literature.

== Features ==
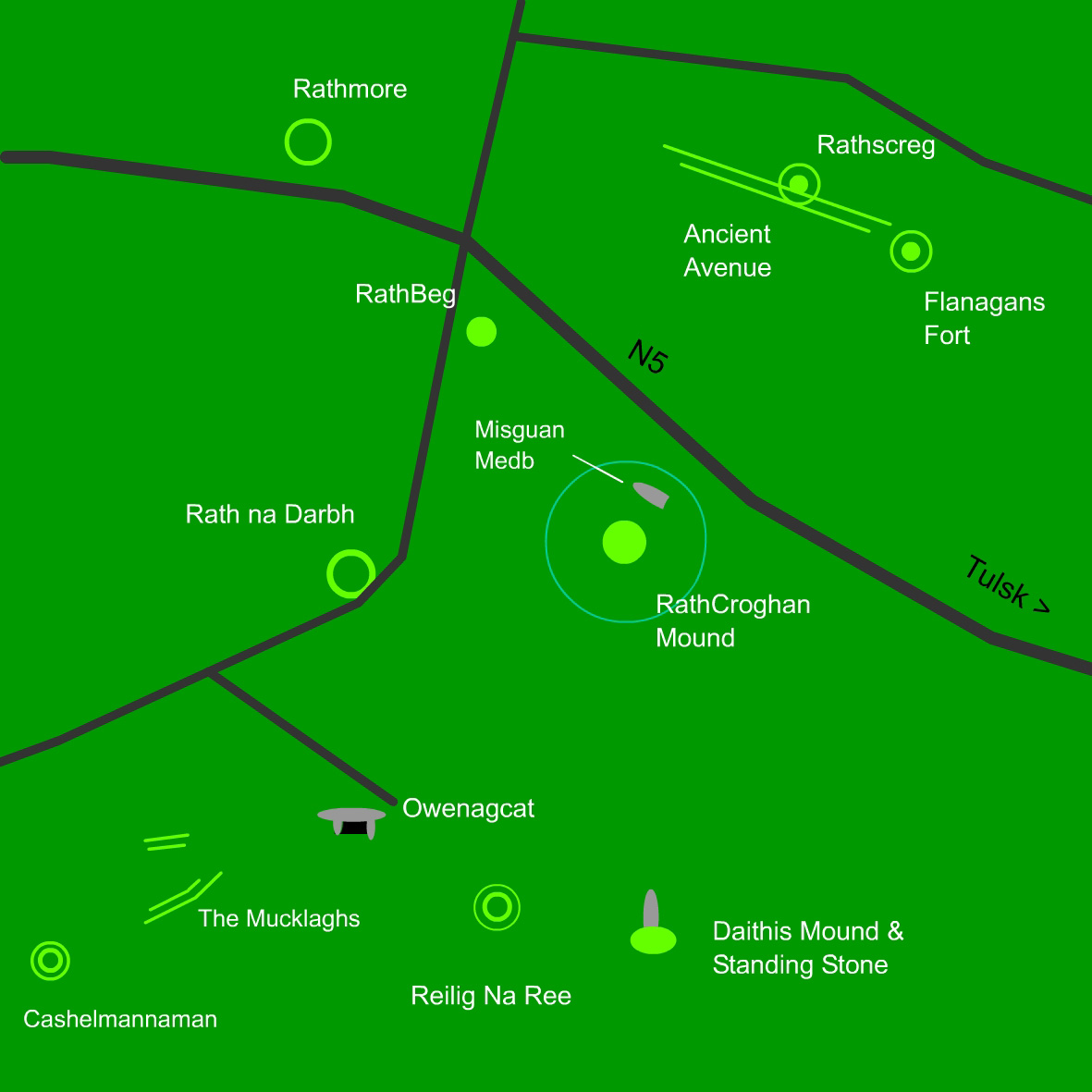
A map of the main sites at Rathcroghan

The Rathcroghan complex has over 240 archaeological sites – 60 of which are classed as national monuments – scattered over approximately 4 square miles (10 km^{2}). They range in date from the Neolithic to the medieval period, and the monument categories include burial mounds, ringforts, linear earthworks and enclosures.

=== Rathcroghan mound ===
The focal point of the complex, Rathcroghan mound is a broad, flat-topped circular mound with an average diameter of 89 metres (292 ft) at the base and a height of 5.5 m (18 ft). Gently sloping ramps to the east and west give access to the summit on which there are traces of a small mound. Surveying has revealed that Rathcroghan mound was built on top of an existing monument that was made of two concentric stone built ring banks. A large enclosure measuring 360 m (1,180 ft) in diameter and 5 m (16 ft) in depth was discovered during surveying. This enclosure surrounds the great mound and various other monuments, beckoning comparisons with other royal sites in Ireland such as Tara, Emain Macha and Dún Ailinne, which have similar enclosures.

=== Rathmore ===
Rathmore (from Irish Ráth Mór meaning "great fort"). It is convex in shape with a diameter of 40 m (130 ft) and surrounded by a 7 m (23 ft) wide ditch. This grass-covered, steep-sided mound is suggested to date from the late phase in the Iron Age into the early medieval period. Although it is similar to a ringfort, the apex of the mound is considered too small. Potential post holes found at the top of the mound may suggest that this was the site of an Iron Age communal hall or similar circular structure. Geophysical surveys indicate evidence of hearths, pits and ovens on the interior which accords with the use of the mound for habitation.

=== Rathnadarve ===
Rathnadarve (from Irish Ráth na dTarbh, 'fort of the bulls'). West of Rathcroghan mound is a large circular ring fort with a considerable bank and external ditch. There are several breaks in the bank, one at the north east being a possible entrance. This is traditionally the site of the fight between the bulls Donn Cuailnge and Finnbennach at the end of the epic Táin Bó Cúailnge.

=== Relignaree ===
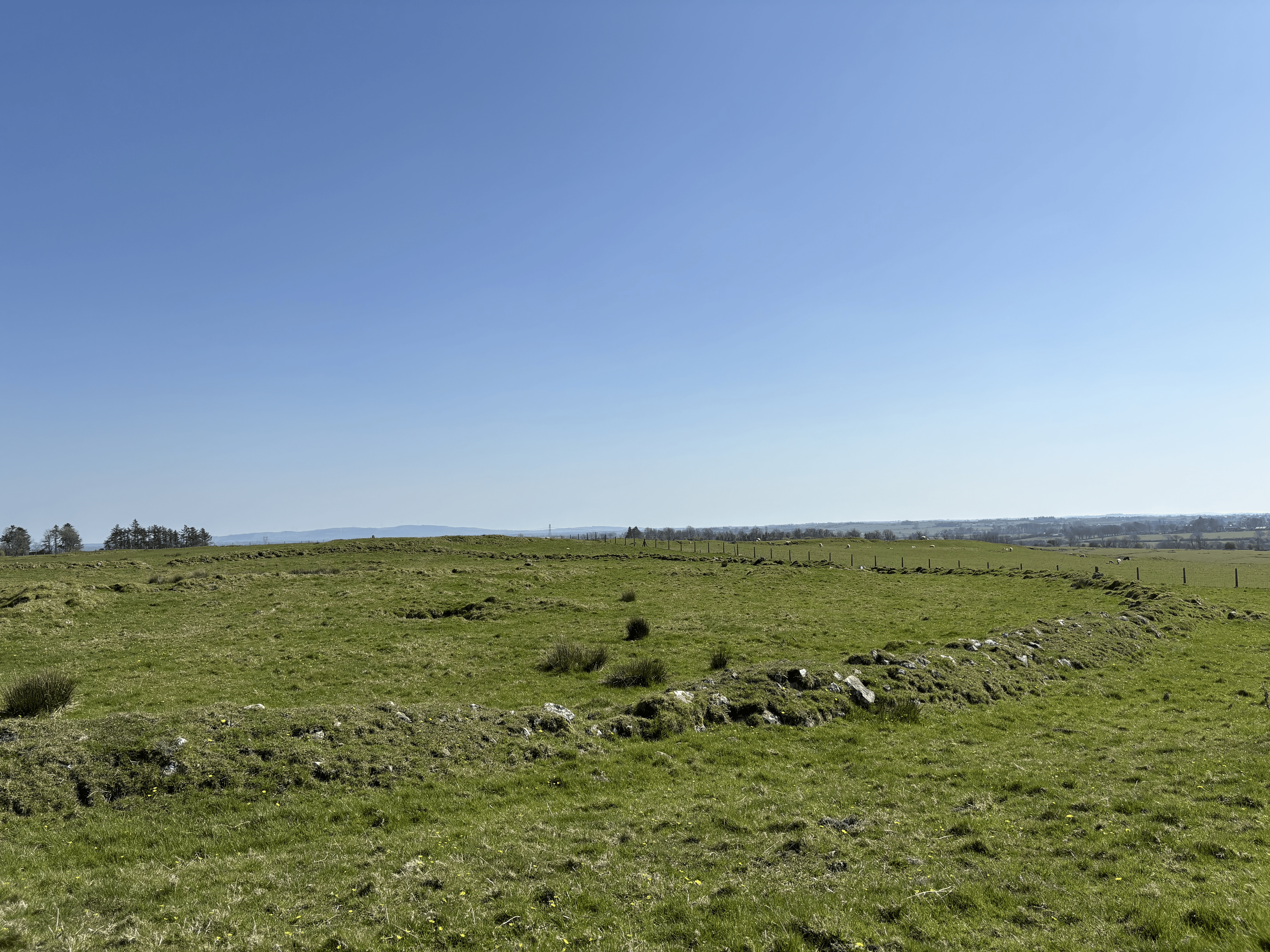
Relignaree

Relignaree (from Irish Reilig na Rí, 'burial place (or graveyard) of the kings'). This is a large circular enclosure with a diameter of 100 m (330 ft) and a stone and earth bank of 1 m (3 ft 3 in) high. In the interior of the enclosure there are traces of a smaller circular enclosure, with a diameter of 48 m (157 ft). Ancient field boundary banks run across this site, seeming to divide it into four unequal segments, and the remains of five rectangular houses are visible in and around the site. In 1872 the remains of a souterrain in the south-west quadrant were excavated and animal bones were found.

=== Oweynagat ===
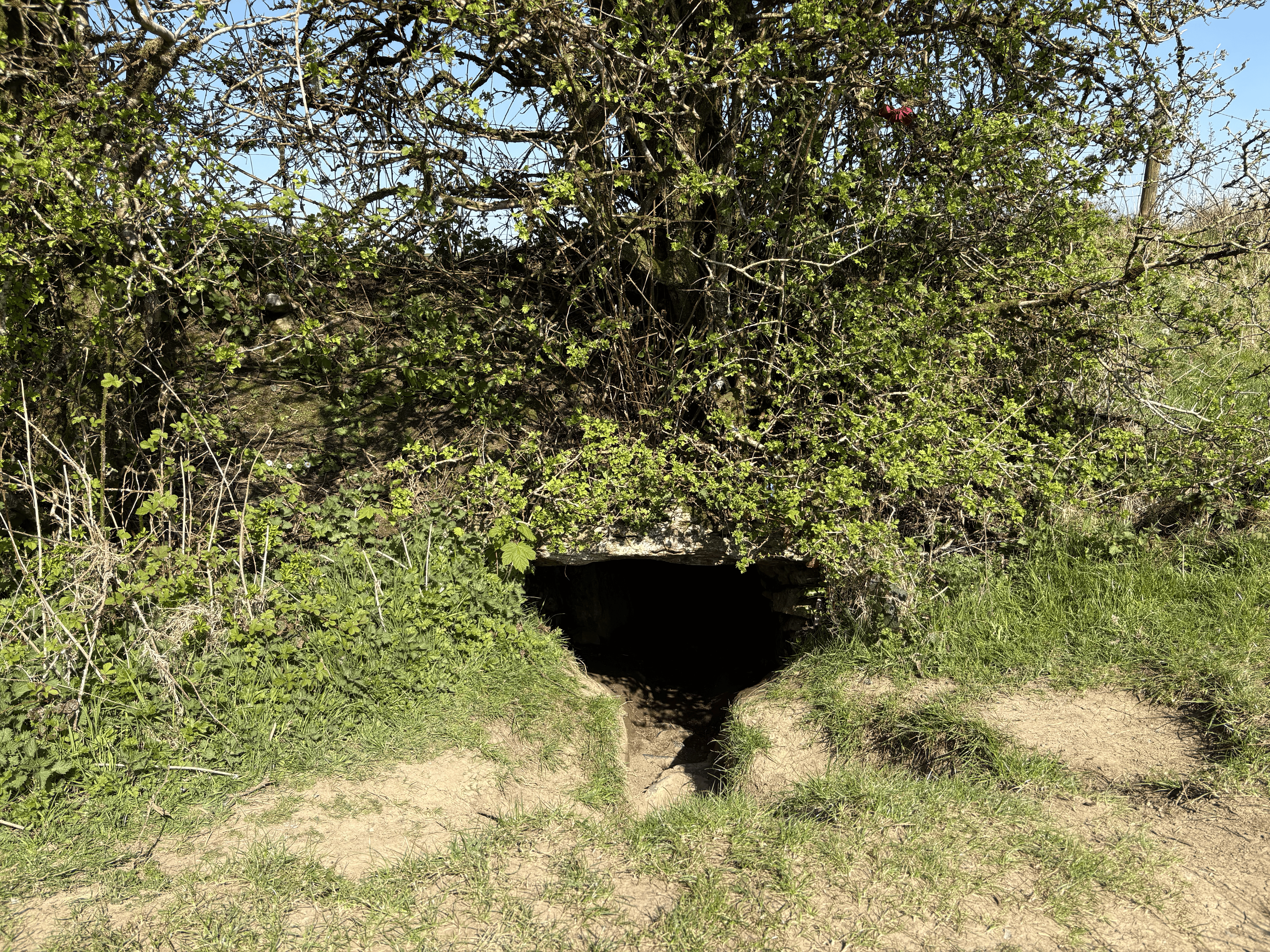
The entrance to Oweynagat

The Irish name for this site is Uaimh na gCat which translates as 'Cave of the Cats'. This is a natural narrow limestone cave with a man-made souterrain at the entrance. Originally the entrance to the souterrain was contained within an earthen mound, which was disturbed by the construction of a road in the 1930s. The souterrain is constructed of drystone walling, orthostats and lintels (with Ogham inscriptions), and measures a total of approximately 10.5 m (34 ft) from the entrance to the natural cave. The natural cave extends for a further 37 m (121 ft).

There is an ogham inscription on the overhead lintel just inside the entrance to the souterrain which reads 'VRAICCI...MAQI MEDVVI', translated to 'of Fraech, son of Medb'. Fraech, in the Táin Bó Cúailnge, is associated with Cruachan and Medb and with the nearby monument of Carnfee (Carn Fraích). A second ogham inscription appears on another lintel inside the passageway, barely visible, which reads 'QR G SMU'; archaeologists report that this inscription is too incomplete to enable a confident reading.

=== Dathí's Mound ===
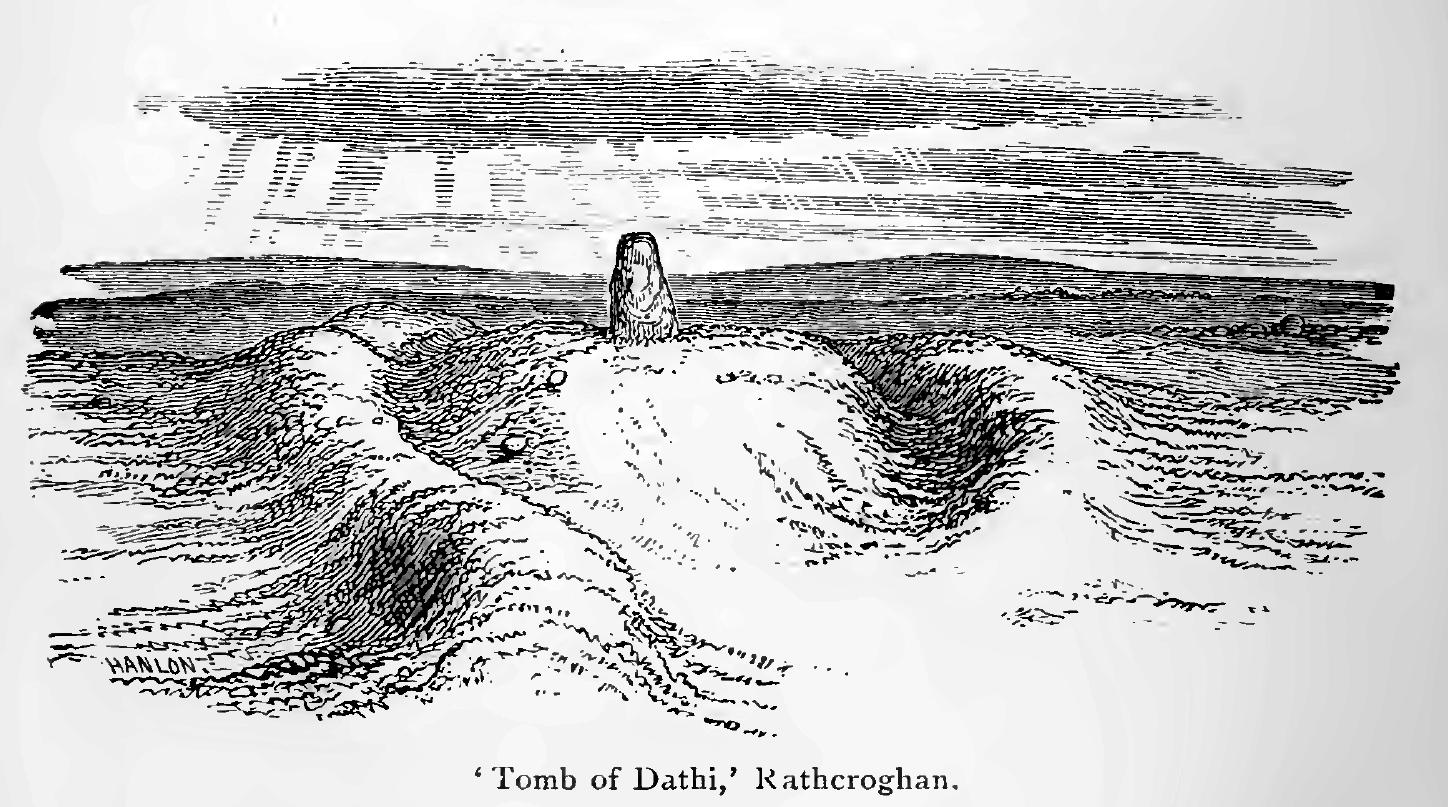
A sketch of Dathí's Mound c. 1900.

This mound was supposed to be the burial place of Dathí, the last pagan High King of Ireland. It appears to be an embanked burial mound with an overall diameter of 40 m (130 ft), with opposed entrances on the east and west. There is a pillar stone of red sandstone atop the mound, the stone standing 1.85 m (6 ft 1 in) high. Macalister's investigations in 1913 revealed that the mound was carved out of a natural gravel ridge. A limited excavation in 1981 confirmed this.

No graves were found at this excavation. Charcoal samples retrieved suggest a building date of between 200 BC – 200 AD. This date conflicts with the legend of this being Dathí's final resting place, as he was supposed to have died around 429 AD, at least 200 years later than the creation of this site.

=== The Mucklaghs ===
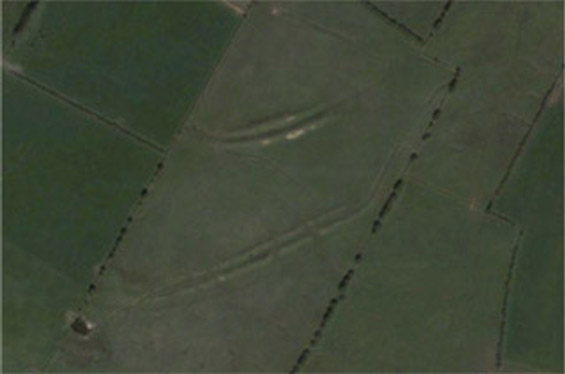
An aerial view of the Mucklaghs

Folklore tells us that these huge earthworks are the results of the rooting of a giant boar, with muic being the Irish word for pig. They are two linear earthworks which consist of double banks with three accompanying ditches which run north-east and south-west in a curving parallel course at a distance of 78 m (256 ft) apart. The Northern Mucklagh is the shorter of the two, measuring 100 m (330 ft), but is impressively massive in its construction. The Southern Mucklagh is significantly longer, measuring approximately 280 m (920 ft). The function of these earthworks is unclear.

=== Rathbeg ===
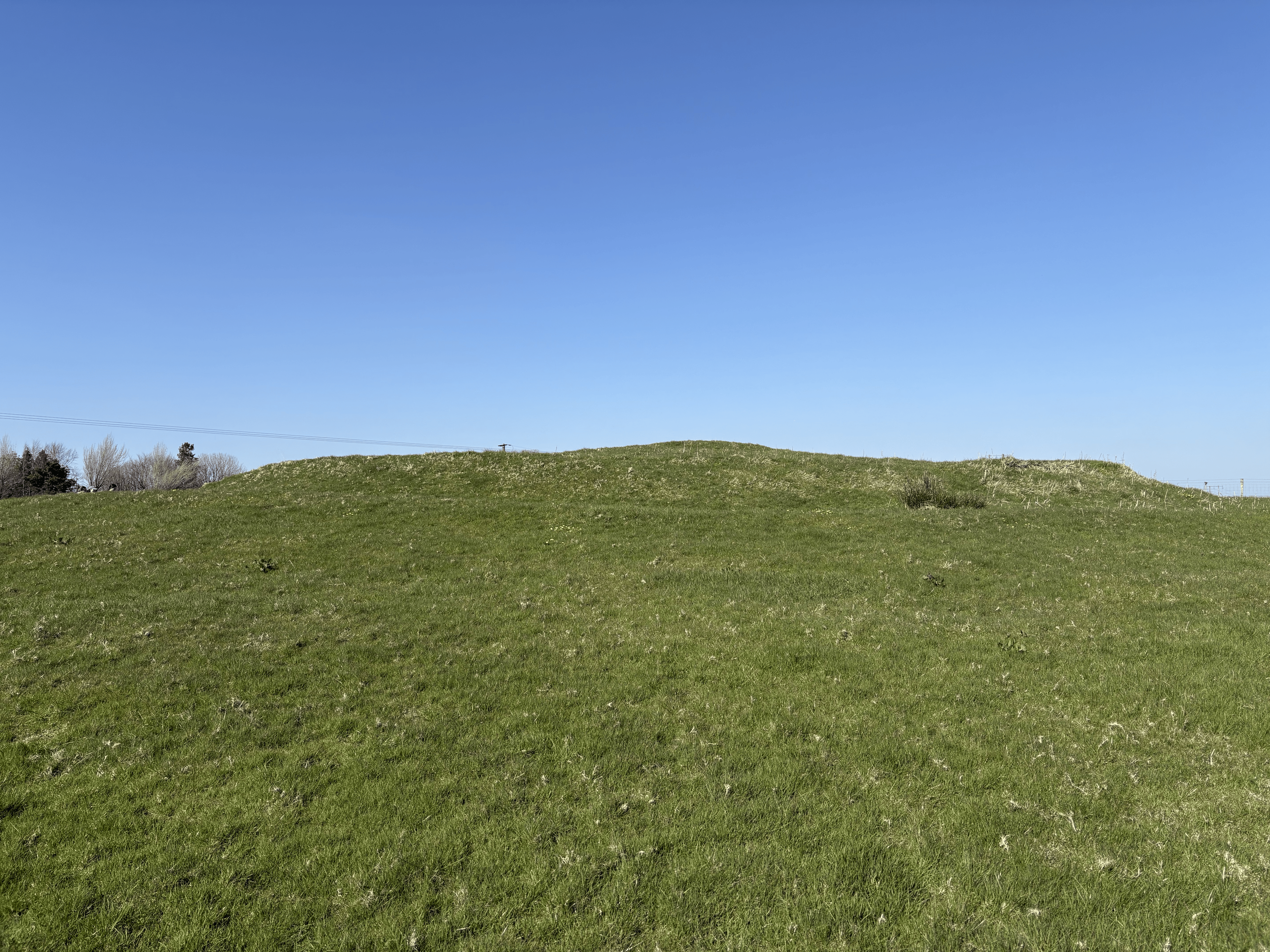
Rathbeg

Rathbeg, "small fort", has been categorised as a ring barrow with three concentric rings that encircle the barrow in a tiered effect. The mound is located 600 m (2,000 ft) north west of Rathcroghan mound. It has a double ditch on three sides of the monument and an extra ditch on the western side. There is a small cairn at the summit surrounded by small banks and ditches, which creates the terracing. The mound is approximately 36 m (118 ft) in diameter. Worked flint discovered on the mound dates from the Iron Age and possibly the Bronze Age; however, the structure itself would be consistent with Neolithic monuments.

=== Cashelmannan ===
Cashelmannan comes from Irish Caiseal Mhanannán, which means 'Manannán's fort', referring to a deity from Irish mythology, Manannán mac Lir. These are the foundation remains of a trivallate oval stone fort, with three closely spaced concentric banks of earth and stone measuring an average of 1.5 m (4 ft 11 in) in width each. The internal diameter measures 40 m (130 ft) with the external measurements being 57 m (187 ft) north/south and 63 m (207 ft) east/west.

Attached to the main enclosure on the north and east sides are two rectangular enclosures, each defined by a singular bank. The exact use of Cashelmanannan is unknown, as excavation has not taken place, but the fact that it is the only structure in the complex built of stone suggests a high-status building with good defensive features.

=== Other sites ===
- Misguan Medb – A fallen standing stone located near Rathcroghan Mound.
- Ancient Avenue – A sunken avenue or trackway surrounded by two low, parallel banks. Part of it intersects with the outer circular bank and ditch of Rathscreig, a site with a small mound at the centre. The avenue which is roughly 15 m (49 ft) wide seems to end at Flanagan's Fort, another ringfort with a small mound at the centre. Both these forts were built at a later date than the avenue.

== Mythology ==
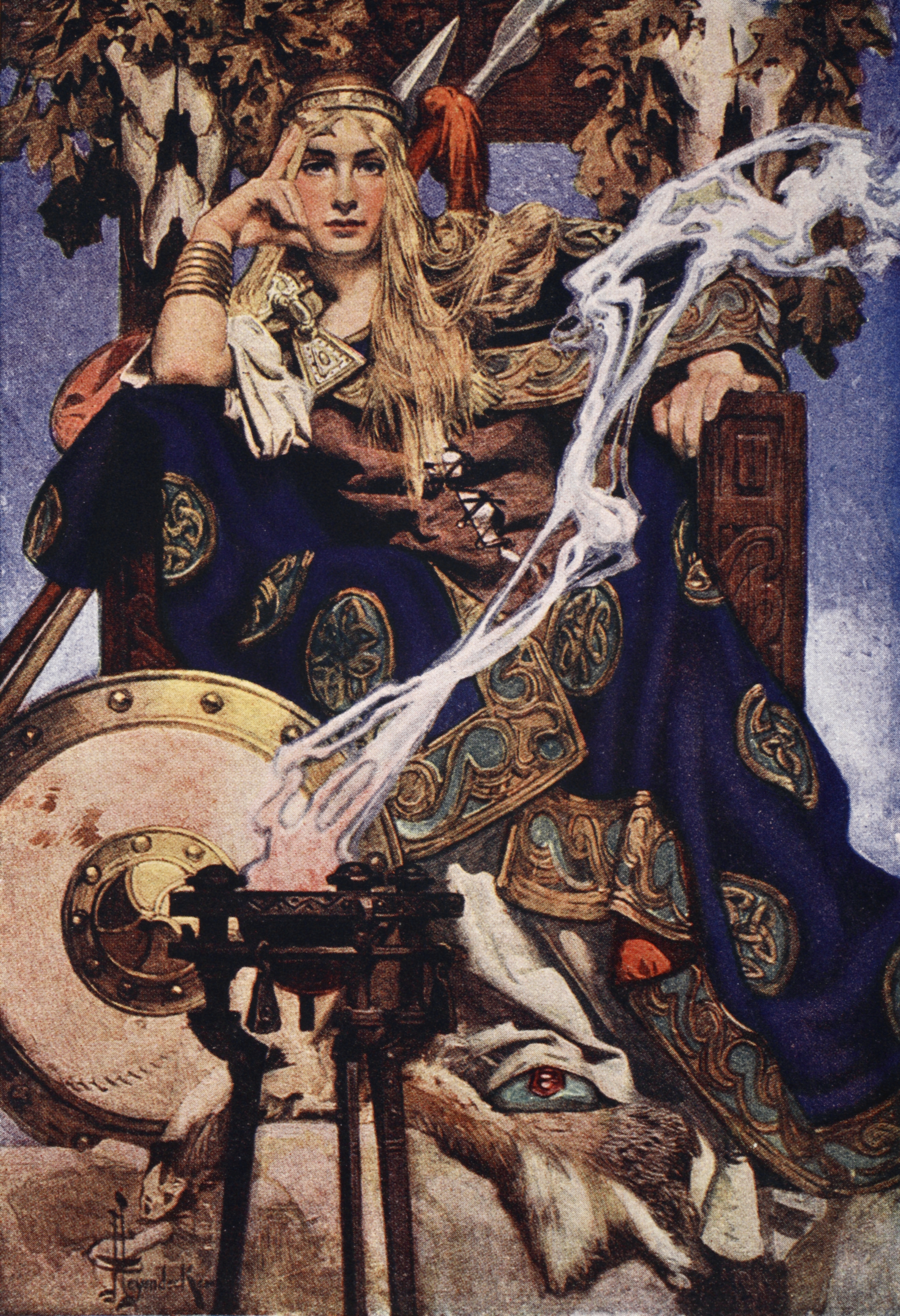
Cruachan is strongly associated with queen Medb.

=== Origin ===
According to a Dindshenchas poem, Cruachan was named after Crochen, the handmaid of Étaín, a sídhe maiden reborn as a mortal. When Étaín is brought back to the Otherworld by her original sídhe lover Midir, Crochen accompanies them and on their way to Midir's underground palace they spend some time in a mound known as Síd Sinche.

Crochen is so impressed by this síd (fairy mound) that she asks Midir if this is his palace. Because of her loyalty to Étaín and her respect for this dwelling, Midir gives it to her and names it in her honour before bringing Étaín to his palace at Bri Leith. At the end of the poem Crochen is mentioned as the mother of Medb.

The same poem mentions Cruachan as a royal cemetery: "Listen, ye warriors about Cruachu! With its barrow for every noble couple".

=== Ulster Cycle ===
Cruachan features heavily in the Ulster Cycle as it was the home of one of its chief characters Queen Medb. She had been given the kingdom of Connacht by her High-King father Eochaid Feidlech who had de-throned the previous king Tindi Mac Conra over an act of treachery. It is unclear if Tindi had actually ruled the province from Cruachan or if it had been built by / for Medb.

Another story states that Cruachan had been ruled by the queen's sister, Clothru, before Medb herself had her killed. Vivid descriptions of the western capital are given in Fled Bricrenn ("Bricriu's Feast"), and this one in Táin Bó Fraích:

"Of pine the house was made; it is a covering of shingle it had externally. There were sixteen windows in the house, and a frame of brass, to each of them; a tie of brass across the roof-light. Four beams of brass on the apartment of Ailill and Medb, adorned all with bronze, and it in the exact centre of the house. Two rails of silver around it under gilding. In the front a wand of silver that reached the middle rafters of the house. The house was encircled all round from the door to the other."

Cruachan features at the start and end of the Táin Bó Cúailgne with the pillow talk in the royal residence, and concluding with the fight of the bulls, supposed to have taken place at Rath na dTarbh, one of the largest ring-forts on the site. Aside from the Ulster tales there are not many mythical descriptions of Connacht's main fort with one of the best examples occurring in a Dindshenchas poem on Carn Fráich. This poem deals with two figures of this name, one being the Fráech of Medb's time and one who was a Connacht prince preceding Ireland's division into Conn's and Eoghan's half, with this section of the poem describing Cruachan as a stone-built fortress.

=== Samhain ===
Cruachan seems to have heavy associations with the feast of Samhain, as it was during this time that the Irish believed that the prehistoric graves from before their time opened and their gods and spirits, who dwelt inside, walked the earth. The emerging of creatures from Oweynagat were part of this belief. A legend based on this is "The Adventures of Nera", in which the warrior of the title is challenged to tie a twig around the ankle of a condemned man on Samhain night.

After agreeing to get some water for the condemned man, he discovers strange houses. When he gets him some water at the third house, he returns him to captivity only to witness Rathcroghan's royal buildings being destroyed by the spirits. He follows the fairy host to the síd where he meets a woman who tells him that what he saw was a vision of what will happen a year from now unless his mortal comrades are warned. He leaves the síd and informs Ailill mac Máta of his vision, who then has the Sidhe destroyed.

=== Cave of Cruachan ===
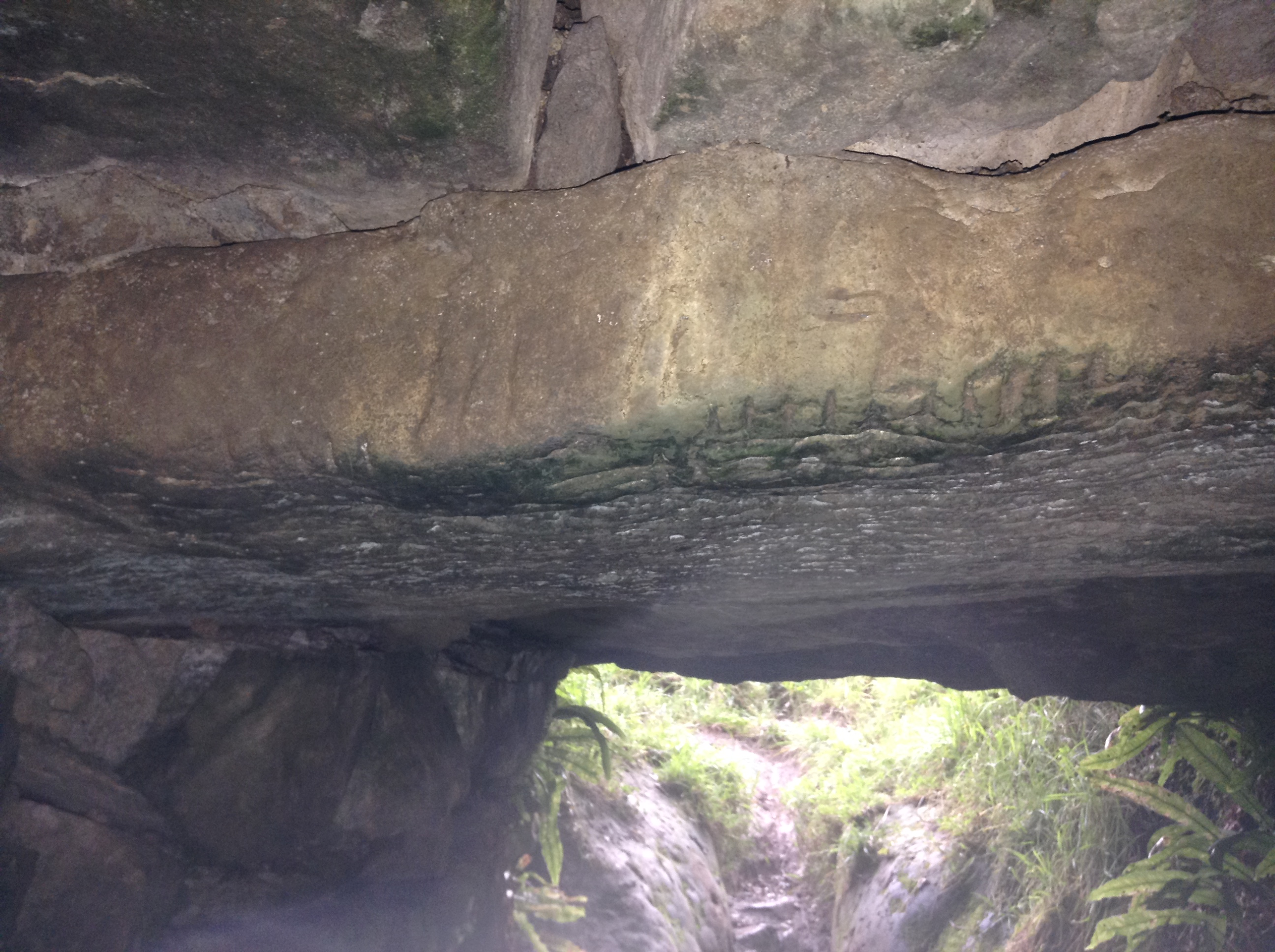
Ogham inscription on the lintel of Oweynagat

Oweynagat is a cave on the site. It is the birthplace of Queen Medb, also known as Queen Maeve.

It is unclear whether what is referred to as the síd is Oweynagat or the mound of Rathcroghan itself.

On the inner lintel is an ogham inscription. The full phrasing is unclear but the words "FRAECH" and "SON OF MEDB" have been translated. It is unclear if this is the same Fraech associated with Queen Medb.

A tale from the 18th century tells of a woman who on trying to catch a runaway cow, follows it into the cave and emerges miles away in Keshcorran, County Sligo.

Various destructive creatures emerged from Oweynagat during Samhain in traditional tales. These included:

- The name Oweynagat may come from the magical wildcats featured in "Bricriu's Feast" that emerge from the cave to attack the three Ulster warriors before being tamed by Cúchulainn.
- The Ellen Trechen was a triple headed monster that went on a rampage across the country before being killed by Amergin, the father of Conall Cernach.
- Small red birds came from the cave withering every plant they breathed on, before being hunted by the Red Branch.
- Herds of pigs with similar decaying powers emerged from the cave with Ailill and Medb themselves desperately trying to hunt them down, but having to deal with the pigs' power of vanishing and ability to shed captured flesh.

=== The Morrígan ===
The Morrígan emerges from this cave in the Táin Bó Regamna on a chariot pulled by a one-legged chestnut horse. She brings a cow, guided by a giant with a forked staff, to breed with the Brown Bull. In another story the Morrígan takes the cows of a woman named Odras who follows her into the cave before falling under an enchanted sleep. Upon awakening she sees the Morrígan who whispers a spell over her, turning Odras into a river.

== History ==
Like the other royal sites, there are not any significant historical references, nor is there any archaeological evidence, that proves it was a royal residence or fortress as described in the myths. It was certainly an important cemetery with the amount of ring barrows backing up the scribes who mention it alongside Tailtiu and Tara as one of the three great burial sites also a gathering place or oenach. All assemblies and oenachs were part of religious and funerary traditions and just as an assembly was held at the cemetery of Tailtiu (even into the 19th century) there would surely have been one at Cruachan.

It is believed by many that Queen Medb was actually the local earth goddess, much like Medb Lethderg at Tara, and that becoming king meant marrying the earth, becoming one with Cruachan with the inauguration more than likely taking place on Rathcroghan mound itself. Cruachan's religious importance diminished after the arrival of Christianity, highlighted by the prologue in the Martyrology of Oengus that contrasts the end of Cruachan's power with the emergence of Clonmacnoise.

The new emerging writers didn't really record what actually happened at sites like this, developing stories which feature the síd of Cruachan being attacked by Ailill and Medb while referring to Owenagat as the hell's gate of Ireland. At the end of the first century, a number of raths were built on the site. Some of these later included souterrains with an entrance for one built over Oweynagat using standing Ogham stones from the site that were unique to Connacht, usually only appearing in the south-west of Ireland.

The area is peppered with medieval field banks, the best examples being around Reilig na Ri, showing that Cruachan became key grazing land possibly attached initially to the early medieval fort built at neighbouring Tulsk, with another nearby feature – Carnfree mound – being used as the inauguration site of the O'Conor kings of Connacht. There is evidence of small house clusters or sean bhaile between the monuments that could have been lived in well past the Middle Ages.

The next important development was surveying that began in the mid-eighteenth century, highlighted by Gabriel Beranger's colour drawing of Cruachan mound. This work was continued by the ordnance survey in the 1830s who, with local help, assigned the names to the monuments that are used to this day. Not much physical excavation has been done around Rathcroghan mound, but technologies such as radar and magnetic surveys have revealed features that show great similarities between Rathcroghan, Tara, and Emain Macha. In 1999 the Cruachan Ai visitor centre was completed in Tulsk, showcasing all the latest research updates done on Rathcroghan as well as Carnfree and Tulsk itself.

A historical reference to the cave is to be found in the Triads of Ireland, dating from the 14th to the 19th century, where "Úam Chnogba, Úam Slángæ and Dearc Fearna" are listed under the heading, "the three darkest places in Ireland". The last, meaning the 'Cave of the Alders', is generally thought to be the present Dunmore Cave, while the first two translate as the caves of Knowth and the caves of Slaney. It is not known which exact system of caves/passage tombs near the river Slaney is being referred to, with the most likely, those at Baltinglass. Other sources translate the listed locations as Rath Croghan, the cave or crypt of Slane and the "Cave of the Ferns".

Information sources for the Rathcroghan complex include a number of annalistic references, several of which refer to events at the site. While the earliest proto-historical annalistic reference to Rathcroghan occurs in the Annals of the Four Masters and is described as dating to 1681 BC, the promulgation of St. Patrick's law and St. Ciaran's law at Crúachan in 783 AD and 814 AD both refer to the site, and may be the earliest genuinely historical reference to Rathcroghan.

== Sources ==
- Gwynn, Edward, ed. (1906). The Metrical Dindshenchas. Vol. 3. CELT.
- Waddell, John (1998). The Prehistoric Archaeology of Ireland. Galway: Galway University Press. hdl:10379/1357. ISBN 978-1-869857-39-4.
- Smyth, Daragh (1988). A Guide to Irish Mythology.
- Herity, Michael (1991). Rathcroghan and Carnfree.
- Keating, G. (1636). Foras Feasa Eirann.
- MacFhirbhisigh, Dubhaltach (1649–1666). Leabhar Mor nGenealach.
- O'Flaithbheartaigh, Ruaidhri (1684). Ogyia.
- Waddell, John (1983). "Rathcroghan – a royal site in Connacht". The Journal of Irish Archaeology. 1: 21–46. JSTOR 30001627.
- Waddell, John (2009). Rathcroghan, Co. Roscommon: Where the Táin Bó Cúailnge began. Archaeology Ireland Heritage Guide. Vol. 44. hdl:10379/1353.
- Mallory, J.P. (1998). "A provisional checklist of Crúachan in the Annals". Emania. 5 Focus on Rathcroghan: 24–26.
- Meyer, Kuno, ed. (1906). The Triads of Ireland. Todd Lecture Series (in English and Irish). Vol. 13. Dublin, IE: Hodges, Figgis & Co; "alt source". CELT.
