= Énna Aignech =

3rd-century BC legendary Irish king

Énna Aignech ('spirited, swift', an epithet usually applied to horses), son of Óengus Tuirmech Temrach, was, according to medieval Irish legend, a High King of Ireland. He took power after killing his predecessor, and relative's killer, Nia Segamain, and ruled for twenty or twenty-eight years, after which he was killed by Crimthann Coscrach, the grandson of the man who had killed Énna's grandfather, in the Battle of Ard Crimthainn. Crimthann was killed by Rudraige mac Sithrigi, the great-grandson of the killer of one of Énna's ancestors. The Lebor Gabála Érenn synchronises his reign with that of Ptolemy VIII Physcon in Egypt (145–116 BC). The chronology of Geoffrey Keating's Foras Feasa ar Éirinn dates his reign to 219–191 BC, that of the Annals of the Four Masters to 313–293 BC.

Preceded by Nia Segamain	Legendary High King of Ireland; LGE 2nd century BC; FFE 219–191 BC; AFM 313–293 BC	Succeeded by Crimthann Coscrach
