= Ellén Trechend =

Mythological Irish monster

The Ellén Trechend is a three-headed monster referred to in Irish mythology. It is mentioned in the text Cath Maige Mucrama (The Battle of Mag Mucrima) as having emerged from the cave of Cruachan (Rathcroghan, County Roscommon) and laid waste to Ireland until it was killed by the Ulaid poet and hero Amergin.

Its name is difficult to interpret: trechend means "three-headed", but ellén is an obscure word. One translator interprets it as a "swarm of three-headed creatures"; Whitley Stokes offered a "monstrous triple-headed bird" (Old Irish én, "bird"); while T. F. O'Rahilly identifies it with Aillén, the fire-breathing monster fought by Fionn mac Cumhaill.

In P.W. Joyce's A Smaller Social History of Ancient Ireland he tells how the Sidhe of Cruachan opened on Samhain and a crowd of horrible goblins rushed out, along with a flock of copper-red birds who were led by a monstrous three-headed vulture. It is very possible that the vulture is the Ellen Trechend as the copper-red birds are also mentioned in Cath Maige Mucrama.
