= Eochy's Cairn =

- Carn Eochaid (Irish)
- Location within Ireland
- 53.588504°N 9.263412°W
- Type: cairn
- Location: Carn, Neale, County Mayo, Ireland

History
- Built: 4000–2500 BC

Site notes
- Elevation: 64 m (210 ft)

National monument of Ireland
- Official name: Eochy's Cairn
- Reference no.: 246

Eochy's Cairn is a cairn and National Monument located in County Mayo, Ireland.

== Location ==
Eochy's Cairn is atop a hill 3 km (1.9 mi) northwest of The Neale overlooking Lough Mask.

== History ==
Eochy's Cairn has never been excavated, but is believed to have been constructed in the Neolithic. With a height of 22 feet and a diameter of over 150 feet Eochy's Cairn might be the largest cairn in Connacht. Nearby to the southwest and northeast are standing stones.

According to tradition, it was the burial site of Eochaid mac Eirc after the mythical Battle of Moytura.
