= Adamair =

According to Irish legend, a high king of Ireland

High King of Ireland
- Predecessor: Ailill Caisfhiaclach
- Successor: Eochaid Ailtleathan

Adamair (Adammair, Adhamair, Amadir), son of Fer Corb, was, according to medieval Irish legends and historical traditions, a High King of Ireland. He came from Munster, killed the previous incumbent, Ailill Caisfhiaclach, and reigned for five years, until he was killed by Eochaid Ailtleathan. The Lebor Gabála Érenn synchronises his reign with that of Ptolemy V Epiphanes in Egypt (204–181 BC). The chronology of the Annals of the Four Masters dates his reign to 418–414 BC, the chronology of Geoffrey Keating's Foras Feasa ar Éirinn to 290–285 BC. He was the husband of the presumed goddess Flidais of the Tuatha Dé Danann.

Preceded by Ailill Caisfhiaclach	High King of Ireland; LGE 3rd/2nd century BC; FFE 290–285 BC; AFM 418–414 BC	Succeeded by Eochaid Ailtleathan
