= Ailill Caisfiaclach =

Ailill Caisfiaclach ("having crooked/hateful teeth"), son of Connla Cáem, was, according to medieval Irish legends and historical traditions, a High King of Ireland. He succeeded his father, and reigned for twenty-five years, until he was killed by Adamair, the son of Fer Corb the man who had killed Ailill's grandfather. The Lebor Gabála Érenn synchronises his reign with that of Ptolemy V Epiphanes in Egypt (204–181 BC). Geoffrey Keating's Foras Feasa ar Éirinn dates his reign from 315 to 290 BC, the Annals of the Four Masters from 443 to 418 BC.

Preceded by Connla Cáem	High King of Ireland; LGE 3rd/2nd century BC; FFE 315–290 BC; AFM 443–418 BC	Succeeded by Adamair
