= Fergus Fortamail =

Fergus Fortamail ("strong, prevailing"), son of Bresal Brecc, son of Óengus Ollom, son of Ailill Bracan, son of Labraid Loingsech, was, according to medieval Irish legend and historical tradition, a High King of Ireland. He took power after killing the previous incumbent, Eochaid Ailtlethan, in battle, and ruled for either eleven, twelve or twelve and a half years, until he was killed by Eochaid's son Óengus Tuirmech Temrach in battle at Tara. The Lebor Gabála Érenn synchronises his reign with that of Ptolemy VI Philometor in Egypt (180–145 BC). The chronology of Geoffrey Keating's Foras Feasa ar Éirinn dates his reign to 274–262 BC, that of the Annals of the Four Masters to 396–385 BC.

Preceded by Eochaid Ailtlethan	High King of Ireland; LGE 2nd century BC; FFE 274–262 BC; AFM 396–385 BC	Succeeded by Óengus Tuirmech Temrach
