= Amergin mac Eccit =

Mythical poet and warrior

Amergin mac Eccit is a poet and warrior in the court of Conchobar mac Nessa in the Ulster Cycle of Irish mythology. He was the son of Eccet Salach, a smith, and grew to the age of fourteen without speaking or washing himself. One day Athirne, the Ulaid's chief poet, sent his servant to Eccet to order an axe. The servant was shocked when Amergin uttered a precocious, cryptic poem, and ran home to tell his master what he had heard.

Athirne resolved to kill the boy, for fear that he might take his job, but Eccet had replaced him with a lifelike clay replica. Athirne showed up to take delivery of his new axe, brought it down on the replica's head, and fled, thinking he had killed Amergin. The Ulaid besieged Athirne in his house and forced him to pay compensation to Eccet. He took Amergin as his foster-son and taught him his poetic skills, and in time Amergin did indeed take over from Athirne as chief poet of Ulster.

Amergin married Findchoem, sister of Conchobar mac Nessa, king of the Ulaid. Their son was Conall Cernach, and their foster-son was Cú Chulainn. He had two other sons, Condra and Amergin. He killed the Ellén Trechend, the three-headed monster that made raids on Ireland from the cave of Cruachan.

During the Táin Bó Cúailnge ("cattle raid of Cooley"), Amergin held up the advance of the Connachta army by pelting them with enormous stones for three days and nights. The Munster hero Cú Roí, who was with the army, threw stones back at him, and the stones smashed together in mid-air, showering the area with bits of stone, until Medb begged them both to stop. They came to an agreement that both would stop, and Cú Roí would return to Munster, but once he had gone, Amergin resumed throwing stones, arguing his agreement was only with Cú Roí. Eventually he agreed to withdraw until the final battle (a variant version of this episode appears in the first recension of Táin Bó Cúailnge, where the combatants are Cú Roí and Munremar mac Gerrcind).
