= Bé Chuille =

Character in Irish mythology

- Member of Tuatha Dé Danann

Genealogy
- Parents: Flidais (mother)

Bé Chuille, also known as Becuille and Bé Chuma, is the daughter of Flidais and one of the Tuatha Dé Danann in Irish mythology.

In a tale from the Metrical Dindshenchas, she is a good sorceress who joins three other of the Tuatha Dé to defeat the evil Greek witch Carman. According to the Book of Leinster (1150) Bé Chuille was killed, along with Dianann, by "gray demons of air." During the second Second Battle of Moytura, Bé Chuille and Dianann are called Lugh's two witches, and when asked what they will do in battle, they respond that they will enchant the trees, stones, and grasses of the earth to route the Fomorians with horror and affliction. In the Lebor Gabála Érenn Bé Chuille and Dianann are called "she-farmers" and mentioned along with their sisters Argoen and Be Theite as the daughters of Flidais.

Becuille is often confused with Bechuma of the Fair Skin. In Echtrae Airt meic Cuinn (The Echtra, or Adventure, of Art mac Cuinn), Bechuma is married to Eogan Inbir, but commits adultery with Gaidiar, son of Manannán mac Lir, and is banished to the human world. Conn of the Hundred Battles marries her, but she becomes infatuated with his son Art. The druids inform Conn that Bechuma's wickedness has turned his realm into a Wasteland, and she is eventually exiled.
