= Athirne =

Legendary Irish poet

Athirne Ailgheasach ("the importunate"), son of Ferchertne, is a poet and satirist of the court of Conchobar mac Nessa in the Ulster Cycle of Irish mythology, who abuses the privileges of poets.

He stole three cranes from Midir of the Tuatha Dé Danann, which stand at his door and refuse entry or hospitality to anyone who approaches.

In the saga "The Siege of Howth", he goes on a circuit of Ireland, visiting kings' courts, and making outrageous demands of hospitality, knowing that disgrace would fall on any kingdom that refused him, and that if anything happened to him the Ulstermen are bound to go to war in his defence. He demands the remaining eye of the one-eyed king of southern Connacht, Eochaid mac Luchta, a night with the wives of Tigerna Tétbuillech, king of Munster and Mesgegra, king of Leinster, and a mysterious jewel from another Leinster king, Fergus Fairge, which Fergus only finds by appealing for help to the "Lord of the Elements". He captures 150 wives of Leinster nobles and prepares to take them back to Ulster with him. The men of Leinster pursue him, the men of Ulster come to his defence, and battle is joined. The Ulstermen are besieged in the fort of Howth Head, north of Dublin, but break out, and the Leinstermen are put to flight. In the ensuing pursuit, the Ulster hero Conall Cernach kills Mesgegra in single combat and takes his head.

When Amergin, son of Eccet Sálach the smith, who has lived to the age of fourteen without speaking, suddenly utters a cryptic poem, Athirne fears the boy will replace him as chief poet of Ulster, and resolves to kill him with an axe. Eccet foils the murder attempt by making a lifelike replica of the boy from clay. The Ulstermen besiege Athirne in his house and force him to pay compensation to Eccet. He takes Amergin as his foster-son and trains him as a poet.

Athirne's downfall comes in the saga "The Wooing of Luaine and Death of Athirne". He and his two sons all fall in love with the beautiful Luaine, who is due to marry Conchobar. She refuses to sleep with them, so they make satires against her, which leave three blotches of shame, blemish and disgrace on her face. She dies of shame, and Athirne and his sons flee to his house on the hill of Benn Athirni on the River Boyne, fearing Conchobar's vengeance. Conchobar gathers the heroes of Ulster, walls him in and burns the house down, killing Athirne, his sons, and his two daughters Mór and Midseng.
