= Dela, Iran =

Dela دلا
- Village
- Location within Iran
- Coordinates: 32°11′48″N 49°48′41″E
- Country: Iran
- Province: Khuzestan
- County: Izeh
- Bakhsh: Central
- Rural District: Pian

Population (2006)
  - Total: 165
- Time zone: UTC+3:30 (IRST)
  - Summer (DST): UTC+4:30 (IRDT)

Dela (Persian: دلا, also Romanized as Delā) is a village in Pian Rural District, in the Central District of Izeh County, Khuzestan Province, Iran. At the 2006 census, its population was 165, in 31 families.
