= Flidais =

Female figure in Irish mythology

Flidas or Flidais (modern spelling: Fliodhas, Fliodhais) is a female figure in Irish Mythology, known by the epithet Foltchaín ("beautiful hair"). She is believed to have been a goddess of cattle and fertility.

== Mythology ==
Flidas is mentioned in the Metrical Dindshenchas as mother of Fand, and in the Lebor Gabála Érenn as the mother of Argoen, Bé Téite, Dinand and Bé Chuille. Dinand and Bé Chuille are mentioned as "she-farmers" in a passage about Dian Cecht in Lebor Gabála Érenn and as witches in the Second Battle of Moytura, where they agree to enchant the trees, stones, and sods of the earth to become a host under arms. In the Middle Irish glossary Cóir Anmann ("Fitness of Names") Flidas is said to be the wife of the legendary High King Adamair and the mother of Nia Segamain.

The Ulster Cycle tale "The Tidings of Conchobar" says that it took seven women to satisfy Fergus, unless he could have Flidais. Her affair with Fergus is the subject of oral tradition in County Mayo.

=== Cattle raid epics ===
The myths relating to Fliodhais overwhelmingly focus on cattle.

Flidais is a central figure in Táin Bó Flidhais ("The Driving-off of Flidais's Cattle"), an Ulster Cycle work, where she is the lover of Fergus mac Róich and the owner of a magical herd of cattle. The story, set in Erris, County Mayo tells how Fergus carried her and her cattle away from her husband, Ailill Finn.

During the Táin Bó Cúailnge (Cattle Raid of Cooley) she slept in the tent of Ailill mac Máta, king of Connacht, and every seven days her herd supplied milk for the entire army. In Táin Bó Flidhais she has a favoured white cow known as "The Maol" which can feed 300 men from one night's milking.

=== Outdated interpretations ===
In the recent past Flidais was popularly rendered as a woodland goddess similar to the Greek Artemis and Roman Diana. Scholars now believe this to be incorrect.

Her son, Nia Segamain, was able to milk wild deer as if they were cows by power received from his mother. This indirect association with deer, and her consequent attribution as a woodland goddess is based on an unlikely medieval folk etymology of her name as flid ois or "wetness of a faun". This etymology may have been an effort to conflate Flidais with the deer maiden, Sadhbh from the Fenian Cycle; however, Fliodhais' mythology overwhelmingly focuses only on domestic cattle and milking.
