= Eochaid Ailtlethan =

Eochaid (or Eochu) Ailtlethan ("broad blade"), son of Ailill Caisfiaclach, was, according to medieval Irish legends and historical traditions, a High King of Ireland. According to the Lebor Gabála Érenn, he took the throne after overthrowing and killing the previous incumbent, Adamair. He ruled for eleven years, until he was killed in battle by Fergus Fortamail. The Lebor Gabála Érenn synchronises his reign with that of Ptolemy V Epiphanes in Egypt (204–181 BC). The chronology of Geoffrey Keating's Foras Feasa ar Éirinn dates his reign to 285–274 BC, that of the Annals of the Four Masters (which gives him a reign of seventeen years) to 414–396 BC.

Preceded by Adamair	High King of Ireland; LGE 3rd/2nd century BC; FFE 285–274 BC; AFM 414–396 BC	Succeeded by Fergus Fortamail
