= Maine mac Darthacht =

In one history of Celtic mythology, Maine mac Darthacht was the son of Perdition, or night. Maine Mac Darthacht had a cloak fastened by eight stones called Maini. It fell into the lap of his brother Fergus Fairge, the Ocean god, father of Lugaid, who as the god of the summer solstice slew Cuchulainn the sun-god after his left thigh had been weakened. Hence the brooch of the eight (stones) belonging to the son of night is the Irish equivalent of the Welsh Wyth-nos. The god Lugaid mentioned is usually synonymous with Lugh. However Lugh's father is Cian of the Tuatha Dé Danann.
