= Gann mac Dela =

Mythical High King of Ireland

Gann, son of Dela, of the Fir Bolg was a legendary joint High King of Ireland with his brother Genann, succeeding their brother Rudraige. His wife was Etar.

When the Fir Bolg invaded Ireland the five sons of Dela divided the island among themselves. Gann and Senngann landed at Inber Dubglaise and split Munster between them, Gann taking the north and Sengann the south of the province.

When their brother Rudraige died, Gann and Genann became joint High King for four years, until they both died of plague, along with two thousand of their followers, and were succeeded by Sengann.

== Primary sources ==
- Lebor Gabála Érenn
- Annals of the Four Masters
- Seathrún Céitinn's Foras Feasa ar Érinn

Royal titles
Preceded by Rudraige	High King of Ireland (with Genann); AFM 1931–1927 BC; FFE 1511–1507 BC	Succeeded by Sengann
