= Fir Bolg =

Mythical settlers of Ireland

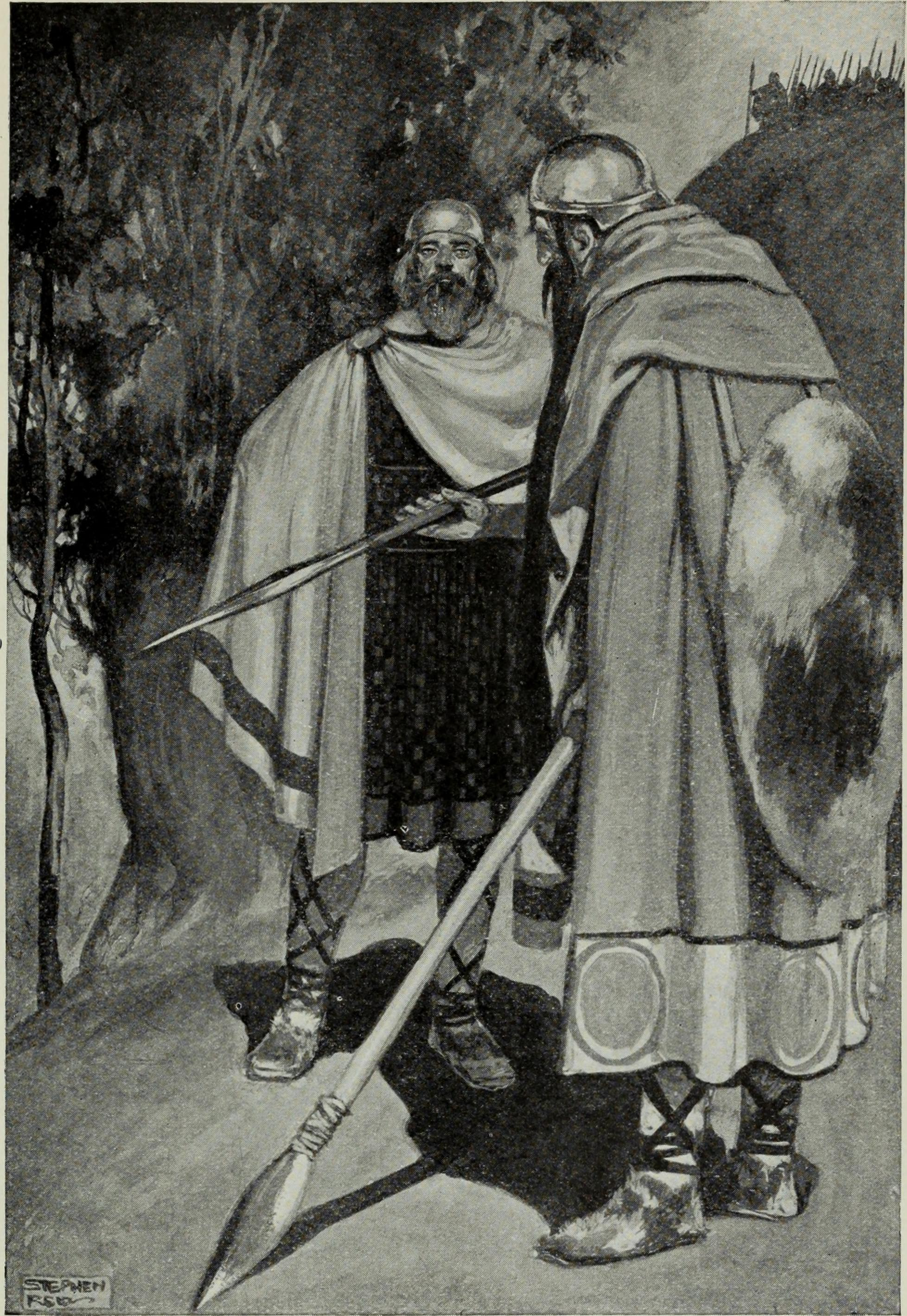
Ambassadors of the Fir Bolg and Tuath Dé meeting before the Battle of Moytura. An illustration by Stephen Reid in T. W. Rolleston's Myths & Legends of the Celtic Race, 1911

In medieval Irish myth, the Fir Bolg (also spelt Firbolg and Fir Bholg) are the fourth group of people to settle in Ireland. They are descended from the Muintir Nemid, an earlier group who abandoned Ireland and went to different parts of Europe. Those who went to Greece became the Fir Bolg, and eventually returned to Ireland, after it had been uninhabited for many years. After ruling it for some time and dividing the island into provinces, they are overthrown by the invading Tuatha Dé Danann.

== Myth ==
Lebor Gabála Érenn tells of Ireland being settled six times by six groups of people. The first three—the people of Cessair, the people of Partholón, and the people of Nemed—were wiped out or forced to abandon the island. The Fir Bolg are said to be descendants of the people of Nemed, who inhabited Ireland before them. All but thirty of Nemed's people were killed in warfare and disaster. Of this thirty, one group flees "into the north of the world", one group flees to Britain, and another group flees to Greece. Those who went into the north became the Tuatha Dé Danann (or Tuath Dé), the main pagan gods of Ireland.

Those who went to Greece became the Fir Bolg. Lebor Gabála Érenn says that they were enslaved by the Greeks and made to carry bags of soil or clay, hence the name 'Fir Bolg' (men of bags). The Cath Maige Tuired says that they were forced to settle on poor, rocky land but that they made it into fertile fields by dumping great amounts of soil on it. After 230 years, they leave Greece at the same time as the Israelites escaped from Egypt. In a great fleet, the Fir Bolg sail to Iberia and then to Ireland.

Led by their five chieftains, they divide Ireland into five provinces: Gann takes North Munster, Sengann takes South Munster, Genann takes Connacht, Rudraige takes Ulster, and Slánga takes Leinster. They establish the High Kingship and a succession of nine High Kings rules over Ireland for the next 37 years. The seat of the high-kings is established at Tara, a site with significance through Medieval times as a source of religious and royal power. The last High King, Eochaid mac Eirc, is the example of a perfect king. The Fir Bolg are also said to have included two sub-groups known as the Fir Domnann and Fir Gáilióin.

After 37 years, the Tuath Dé arrive in Ireland. Their king, Nuada, asks to be given half the island, but the Fir Bolg king Eochaid refuses. The two groups meet at the Pass of Balgatan, and the ensuing battle—the First Battle of Mag Tuired—lasts for four days. During the battle, Sreng, the champion of the Fir Bolg, challenges Nuada to single combat. With one sweep of his sword, Sreng cuts off Nuada's right hand. However, the Fir Bolg are defeated and their king, Eochaid, is slain by the three sons of Nemid. Sreng saves them from total destruction, however. According to some texts, the Fir Bolg flee Ireland. According to others, the Tuath Dé offer them one quarter of Ireland as their own, and they choose Connacht. They are mentioned very little after this in the myths.

The Historia Brittonum—which was written earlier than the Lebor Gabála—says there were only three settlements of Ireland: the people of Partholón, the people of Nemed, and the Gaels. However, it mentions that a leader called Builc or Builg and his followers had taken an island called Eubonia, believed to be the Isle of Man. The Lebor Gabála adds the Fir Bolg into the scheme and increases the number of settlements to six. It has been suggested that this number was chosen to match the "Six Ages of the World".

| Preceded by Nemedians | Mythical settlers of Ireland | Succeeded by Tuatha Dé Danann |

== Analysis ==
Today, most scholars regard the Lebor Gabála as myth rather than history. It is believed the goal of its writers was to provide an epic origin story for the Irish, like that of the Israelites, which reconciled native myth with the Christian view of history. Ireland's inhabitants (in this case the Fir Bolg) are likened to the Israelites by escaping from slavery and making a great journey to a 'Promised Land'. The pagan gods (the Tuath Dé) are depicted as a group of people with powers of sorcery.

The name Fir Bolg is usually translated in the early literature as "men of bags". The Irish word fir means "men" and the word bolg/bolc can mean a belly, bag, sack, bellows, and so forth. Kuno Meyer and R. A. Stewart Macalister argue that the name comes from the term Fir i mBolgaib, meaning "breeches wearers", literally "men in (baggy) breeches", which could be interpreted as a term of contempt for the "lower orders". Macalister suggests this expression had fallen out of use by the time the Lebor Gabála was written, and the writers tried to make sense of it by creating a story about men with bags. It has also been suggested that it originally meant men who were "bulging" or "swollen" with battle fury.

The name may be based on, and cognate with, Belgae. The Belgae were a group of tribes living in northern Gaul. Some have suggested that the writers named a fictional race, the Fir Bolg, after a real group, the Belgae. T. F. O'Rahilly suggested that Fir Bolg, or Builg, was another name for the Érainn. He believed they were linked to the Belgae and settled Ireland around the 5th century BC. O'Rahilly's theory has been challenged by historians and archaeologists, and is no longer accepted.

John Rhys and R. A. Stewart Macalister suggest that the Fir Bolg are the Fomorians (Fomoire) under another guise. Macalister notes that the Fir Bolg are the only group of settlers who are not harried by the Fomorians. The Tuath Dé fight two similar battles at Mag Tuired, one against the human Fir Bolg and one against the supernatural Fomorians. The Fir Bolg lead the Fomorians to the second battle. The Fomorians seem to have represented the harmful or destructive powers of nature, while the Tuath Dé represented the gods of growth and civilization.

== See also ==
- Na fir bolg (a folk music festival)
- Fir Ol nEchmacht
- Firbolg (Dungeons & Dragons)
