= Rudraige mac Dela =

Mythical High King of Ireland

Rudraige (modern spelling: Ruadhraighe), son of Dela, of the Fir Bolg was the legendary second High King of Ireland, succeeding his brother Sláine.

When the Fir Bolg invaded Ireland the five sons of Dela divided the island amongst themselves. Rudraige landed at Tracht Rudraige (Dundrum Bay, County Down) and took Ulster. He and his brother Genann led the portion of the Fir Bolg known as the Fir Domnann, a historical people who were possibly related to the Dumnonii known from Britain and Gaul.

His wife was Liber. After Sláine's death, Rudraige became High King for two years, until he died at the Brú na Bóinne (Newgrange). He was succeeded by his brothers Gann and Genann.

Rudraige was the name of two other figures from Irish mythology, one a son of Partholón, who led the first settlement of Ireland after the Flood, the other a Milesian High King of the 2nd or 3rd century BC. All three were associated with the province of Ulster, and it seems likely that they were all derived from an ancestor-deity of the Ulaid.

Royal titles
Preceded by Sláine	High King of Ireland; AFM 1933–1931 BC; FFE 1513–1511 BC	Succeeded by Gann and Genann
