= Sengann mac Dela =

Son of Dela, a mythical High King of Ireland

Sengann (modern spelling: Seangann), son of Dela, of the Fir Bolg, was a legendary High King of Ireland, succeeding his brothers Gann and Genann. His wife was Anust.

When the Fir Bolg invaded Ireland the five sons of Dela divided the island amongst themselves. Sengann landed with Gann at Inber Dubglaise and the pair divided Munster between them, Sengann taking the south and Gann the north of the province.

After death of Gann and Genann of plague, Sengann ruled Ireland for five years, before he was killed by Fiacha Cennfinnán, his brother Rudraige's grandson.

Preceded by Gann and Genann	High King of Ireland; AFM 1927–1921 BC; FFE 1507–1502 BC	Succeeded by Fiacha Cennfinnán

== Primary sources ==
- Lebor Gabála Érenn
- Annals of the Four Masters
- Geoffrey Keating's Foras Feasa ar Érinn
