= Genann =

Mythical High King of Ireland

Genann Mac Dala (modern spelling: Geanann), son of Dela (Dela was a descendant of Starn, son of Nemed), of the Fir Bolg was a legendary joint High King of Ireland with his brother Gann, succeeding their brother Rudraige. His wife was Cnucha.

When the Fir Bolg invaded Ireland the five sons of Dela divided the island among themselves. Genann landed with Rudraige at Tracht Rudraige (Dundrum Bay, County Down) and took the province of Connacht.

When their brother Rudraige died, Gann and Genann became joint High King for four years, until they both died of plague, along with two thousand of their followers, and were succeeded by Sengann.

== Primary sources ==
- Lebor Gabála Érenn
- Annals of the Four Masters
- Geoffrey Keating's Foras Feasa ar Érinn

Regnal titles
New post	King of Connacht	Succeeded by Conrac Cas
Preceded by Rudraige	High King of Ireland (with Gann); AFM 1931–1927 BC; FFE 1511–1507 BC	Succeeded by Sengann
