= Ollom Fotla =

Legendary Irish high king

Ollom Fotla ("the scholar of Fódla", a poetic term for Ireland; later spelled Ollamh Fodhla), son of Fíachu Fínscothach, was, according to medieval Irish legend and historical tradition, a High King of Ireland. His given name was Eochaid. He took power after killing his predecessor, Faildergdóit, whose father, Muinemón, had killed his father. He ruled for forty years, and died of natural causes at Tara, succeeded by an unbroken sequence of six descendants, beginning with his son Fínnachta, followed by two more sons, Slánoll and Géde Ollgothach.

He is said to have instituted the Feis Temrach or Assembly of Tara. Keating describes the Feis Temrach as an assembly like a parliament, at which the nobles, scholars and military commanders of Ireland gathered on Samhain every three years to pass and renew laws and approve annals and records. The Assembly was preceded and followed by three days of feasting. He also built a structure at Tara called the Múr nOlloman or Scholar's Rampart.

In the 1870s E.A. Conwell made the claim that Cairn T in the Loughcrew megalithic tomb complex was the tomb of Ollamh Fodhla. The link was based on a claim by James Fergusson ("Rude Stone Monuments in All Countries", 1872, Ch. V, p. 199) that the tomb complex at Loughcrew was the cemetery known as Tailten (or Talten) known from historical documents, with the modern settlement of Teltown being representative of the old place name. Conwell also linked a large stone with Neolithic carvings on it at the site, known as Hag's chair, as the judicial seat of Ollamh Fodhla, who was recorded as being a law giver/maker - this supposed link was a large part of his thesis linking the king and site. The claim is mostly conjecture.

== Time frame ==
The Lebor Gabála Érenn synchronises his reign with those of Arbaces and Sosarmus, said to be kings of the Medes but now considered legendary Iranian rulers. The chronology of Keating's Foras Feasa ar Éirinn dates his reign to 943–913 BC, that of the Annals of the Four Masters to 1318–1278 BC. The chronology of Roderick O'Flaherty's Ogygia dates his reign to 714–674 BC.

== Issue ==
- Slánoll, High King of Ireland (father of Ailill mac Slánuill)
- Fínnachta, High King of Ireland (father of Fíachu Findoilches)
- Géde Ollgothach, High King of Ireland (father of Berngal)
- Cairpre (great-grandfather of Finn mac Blatha)

Preceded by Faildergdóit	High King of Ireland; AFM 1318–1278 BC; FFE 943–913 BC	Succeeded by Fínnachta
