= Fiacha =

Fiacha (earlier Fíachu) is a name borne by numerous figures from Irish history and mythology, including:

- Fiacha Cennfinnán, High King of Ireland in the 16th or 20th century BC
- Fiacha mac Delbaíth, High King in the 14th or 18th century BC
- Fiacha Labhrainne, High King in the 11th or 15th century BC
- Fiacha Finscothach, High King in the 10th or 14th century BC
- Fiacha Finnailches, High King in the 9th or 13th century BC
- Fiacha Tolgrach, High King in the 6th or 9th century BC
- Fiacha Sraibhtine, High King in the 3rd century BC
- Fiacha Finnfolaidh, High King in the 1st century AD
- Fiacha Muilleathan, a king of Munster in the 3rd century AD
- Fiachu mac Néill, son of Niall of the Nine Hostages

== Similar names ==
- Fiach
- Fiachra
- Fiachna
