= Lugaid Laigde =

Lugaid Laigdech, son of Eochu mac Ailella, was, according to medieval Irish legend and historical tradition, a High King of Ireland. He helped Dui Ladrach overthrow Airgetmar, and later killed Dui to take the kingship himself. He ruled for seven years, until he was killed by Airgetmar's grandson Áed Rúad. The Lebor Gabála synchronises his reign with that of Artaxerxes III of Persia (358-338 BC). The chronology of Geoffrey Keating's Foras Feasa ar Éirinn dates his reign to 537-530 BC, that of the Annals of the Four Masters to 738-731 BC.

Keating refers to a story that Lugaid, when hunting, once met a hideous hag wearing a magic mask. When he slept with her he took off her mask, and dreamed that she became a beautiful young woman. Keating interprets this as an allegory of Ireland, meaning that Lugaid first endured toil and torment, and then enjoyed pleasure, over her. He also tells a story from the Cóir Anmann ("Fitness of Names") about a certain Lugaid Loígde, one of the five sons of Dáire Doimthech, all of whom were called Lugaidh. A druid prophesied to Dáire that one of his sons would rule Ireland. When Dáire asked which one, he was told to take all five to Tailtiu and pursue a beautiful fawn which would appear to them there, and the one who outran it would be king. They chased it from Tailtiu to Howth, where a magical mist obscured all five from the men of Ireland. The son who caught and killed the fawn was Lugaidh Laighdhe. However, as this Lugaidh has a different father, Keating does not believe he is the same man.

Preceded by Dui Ladrach	High King of Ireland; LGE 4th century BC; FFE 537-530 BC; AFM 738-731 BC	Succeeded by Áed Rúad
