= Lugaid =

Lughaidh (LOO-ee or LOO-ig; Irish pronunciation: [ˈl̪ˠuːj]) is an Irish-language name, from Old Irish Lugaid which is thought to be derived from the name of the god Lug, generally anglicised as Louis or Lewis. The name is prevalent among figures in Irish history and mythology, including:

== High Kings of Ireland ==
- Lugaid Íardonn, legendary High King of Ireland of the 9th century BC
- Lugaid Lámdearg, legendary High King of Ireland of the 9th century BC
- Lugaid Laigde, legendary High King of Ireland of the 8th century BC
- Lugaid Luaigne, legendary High King of Ireland of the 2nd century BC
- Lugaid Riab nDerg, legendary High King of Ireland of the 1st century BC
- Lugaid Mac Con, semi-legendary High King of Ireland of the 3rd century AD
- Lugaid mac Lóegairi (died c. 507), High King of Ireland
- Lugaid Loígde, legendary King of Tara upon whom several of the above may be based

== Other historical figures ==
- Lugaid mac Nóis, legendary king of Munster and suitor of Emer
- Lugaid mac Con Roí, legendary king of Munster and killer of Cú Chulainn
- Lugaid Lága, henchman of Lugaid Mac Con, regarded as one of the greatest warriors in Ireland

== Saints ==
- Saint Moluag (died 592), also known as Saint Lughaidh, 6th-century Irish Pict missionary
- Saint Molua, 6th-century Irish saint, founder of Killaloe

== See also ==
- Dáire
- List of Irish-language given names
