= Cairbre Cinnchait =

Cairbre Cinnchait or Caitchenn ("cat-head" or "hard head") was, according to medieval Irish legend and historical tradition, a High King of Ireland. There is considerable differences in the sources over his ancestry and his place in the traditional sequence of High Kings.

According to the Lebor Gabála Érenn, he succeeded to the throne after the previous incumbent, Conchobar Abradruad, was killed by Crimthann Nia Náir, and ruled for five years. The Lebor Gabála is unsure of his origins: it says "the learned reckon" he was of either the Luaigne of Tara, the Tuatha Dé Danann, the Catraige of Connacht, the Corcortri (descendants of the former High King Cimbáeth), or a descendant of Ír, son of Míl Espáine. His father's name is said to be Duthach. His wife was Mani, daughter of the king of the Ulaid, and they had a son, Morann mac Máin. He was succeeded by Feradach Finnfechtnach. His reign is synchronised with that of the Roman emperor Domitian (AD 81–96).

According to the Annals of the Four Masters, Crimthann became High King after he killed Conchobar, and Cairbre succeeded Crimthann "after he had killed all the nobility". Cairbre is here the leader of an uprising of the aithech-tuatha or "subject peoples". Three pregnant women of the nobility escaped the massacre: Baine, daughter of the king of Alba, who was the mother of Feradach Finnfechtnach; Cruife, daughter of the king of Britain, who was the mother of Corb Olum, ancestor of the Eóganachta of Munster; and Aine, daughter of the king of Saxony, who was the mother of Tibraide Tirech, ancestor of the Dál nAraidi. During Cairbre's reign crops failed, cows did not give milk, and there were no fish in the rivers. He died after ruling for five years, and was succeeded by Feradach Finnfechtnach, who must have been less than five years old. The chronology of the Annals dates his reign to AD 9–14.

Geoffrey Keating agrees that Crimthann succeeded Conchobar, but was succeeded by Feradach Finnfechtnach, Fíatach Finn and Fíachu Finnolach. Here it is Fíachu who is overthrown by Cairbre's uprising of subject peoples, and the pregnant noblewomen who escape are: Fiacha's wife Eithne, daughter of the king of Alba, the mother of Tuathal Techtmar; Beartha, daughter of the king of Britain and mother of Tibraide Tirech; and Aine, daughter of the king of the Saxons, mother of Corb Olom. Keating says Cairbre was either the descendant of a Scandinavian prince who came to Ireland with Labraid Loingsech, or of the Fir Bolg. He ruled for five years, died of plague, and was succeeded by Elim mac Conrach, who would eventually be overthrown by Fiacha's son Tuathal. The chronology of Keating's Foras Feasa ar Éirinn dates his reign to AD 55–60.

Preceded by LGE Conchobar Abradruad; FFE Fíachu Finnolach; AFM Crimthann Nia Náir	High King of Ireland; LGE 1st century AD; FFE AD 55–60; AFM AD 9–14	Succeeded by LGE/AFM Feradach Finnfechtnach; FFE Elim mac Conrach
