= Sétna =

Sétna or Sedna was the name of two legendary High Kings of Ireland:

- Sétna Airt, son of Artrí, son of Éber, son of Ír, son of Míl Espáine
- Sétna Innarraid, son of Bres Rí

== See also ==
- Renu Setna, British actor
- Sethna
- Sedna (disambiguation)
