= Connla Cáem =

Legendary High King of Ireland

Connla Cáem ("the beautiful"), also known as Connla Cruaidchelgach ("bloody blade"), son of Irereo, was, according to medieval Irish legend and historical tradition, a High King of Ireland.

== Biography ==
He came to power after he killed his predecessor, and his father's killer, Fer Corb, and ruled for four (or twenty) years, until he died in Tara, and was succeeded by his son Ailill Caisfiaclach. The Lebor Gabála Érenn synchronises his reign with that of Ptolemy IV Philopator of Egypt (221–205 BC). The chronology of Geoffrey Keating's Foras Feasa ar Éirinn dates his reign to 319–315 BC, the Annals of the Four Masters to 463–443 BC.

Preceded by Fer Corb	High King of Ireland; LGE 3rd century BC; FFE 319–315 BC; AFM 463–443 BC	Succeeded by Ailill Caisfiaclach

== See also ==
- Connla the Ruddy
- Connla, the son of Cú Chulainn
