= Irereo =

High King of Ireland (300s or 400s)

Irereo Fáthach ("the wise"), son of Meilge Molbthach, was, according to medieval Irish legend and historical tradition, a High King of Ireland. He took power after killing his predecessor, Óengus Ollom, and ruled for seven or ten years, until he was killed in Ulster by Fer Corb, son of Mug Corb. The Lebor Gabála Érenn synchronises his reign with that of Ptolemy III Euergetes of Egypt (246–222 BC). The chronology of Geoffrey Keating's Foras Feasa ar Éirinn dates his reign to 337–330 BC, the Annals of the Four Masters to 481–474 BC.

Preceded by Óengus Ollom	High King of Ireland; LGE 3rd century BC; FFE 337–330 BC; AFM 481–474 BC	Succeeded by Fer Corb
