= Rudraige mac Sithrigi =

Legendary High King of Ireland

Rudraige mac Sithrigi (Irish: Ruairí; English: Rory mac Sitric), was, according to medieval Irish legend and historical tradition, a High King of Ireland. The son of Sitric, he took power after killing his predecessor, Crimthann Coscrach, and ruled for thirty or seventy years, after which he died of plague in Airgetglenn. He was succeeded by Finnat Már, son of Nia Segamain. He is the ancestor of Clanna Rudraige.

== Time frame ==
The Lebor Gabála synchronises the start of his reign with that of Ptolemy VIII Physcon (145–116 BC), and his death with that of Ptolemy X Alexander I (110–88 BC) in Egypt. The chronology of Geoffrey Keating's Foras Feasa ar Éirinn dates his reign to 184–154 BC, that of the Annals of the Four Masters to 289–219 BC. The poem "Druim Cet céide na naomh" states the convention of Druim Cet (held c.590 AD) was 700 years after the reign of Rudraige, which would imply a floruit of c.110 BC.

== Issue ==
Rudraige was particularly associated with the northern part of Ireland: the Ulaid, who later formed a confederation in eastern Ulster in the early Middle Ages, traced their descent from him, and the Lebor Gabála Érenn names him as the grandfather of the Ulaid hero Conall Cernach. John O'Hart lists the following issue in his Stem of the Irish Nation:

- Bresal Bó-Díbad, High King of Ireland
- Congal Cláiringnech, High King of Ireland
- Conrach (father of Elim mac Conrach)
- Fachtna Fáthach (father of Conchobar mac Nessa)
- Ros Ruadh (father of Fergus mac Róich)
- Cionga (supposed ancestress of Conall Cernach)

== Resting place ==
It is claimed that some traditions of the Clanna Rudraige assign the Bay of Dundrum in modern County Down, as the resting place of Rudraige. This is the location of the Tonn Rudraige (wave of Rory) one of the "Three Waves of Erin" mentioned in the Annals of the Four Masters, and believed to be named after Rudraige.

Preceded by Crimthann Coscrach	High King of Ireland; LGE 2nd–1st century BC; FFE 184–154 BC; AFM 289–219 BC	Succeeded by Finnat Már
