= Óengus Ollom =

Óengus Ollom (English: the scholar), according to medieval Irish legend and historical tradition, was a High King of Ireland who was the son of Ailill, the son of Labraid Loingsech. He took power after he killed the previous incumbent, Mug Corb, and ruled for eighteen years, until he was killed by Irereo, son of Meilge Molbthach. The Lebor Gabála Érenn synchronizes his reign with that of Ptolemy III Euergetes of Egypt (246–222 BC). The chronology of Geoffrey Keating's Foras Feasa ar Éirinn dates his reign to 355–337 BC, the Annals of the Four Masters to 499–481 BC.

Preceded by Mog Corb	High King of Ireland; LGE 3rd century BC; FFE 355–337 BC; AFM 499–481 BC	Succeeded by Irereo
