= Ailill Finn =

Ailill Finn, son of Art mac Lugdach, was, according to medieval Irish legend and historical tradition, a High King of Ireland. In the Lebor Gabála Érenn, he succeeded to the throne when his father was killed by Fíachu Tolgrach and his son Dui Ladrach. He ruled for nine years. Two years into his reign, Fíachu Tolgrach was killed in battle against Airgetmar, son of Sírlám. The men of Munster, led by Ailill's son Eochu and Lugaid, son of Eochu Fíadmuine, then drove Airgetmar into exile overseas. After seven years Airgetmar returned to Ireland and killed Ailill with the help of Dui Ladrach and his son Fíachu, but was unable to seize the throne, which was taken by Eochu.

However, in Geoffrey Keating's Foras Feasa ar Éirinn and the Annals of the Four Masters Fíachu Tolgrach succeeded to the throne after killing Art, and is later killed by Ailill, who then took the throne, and ruled for nine or eleven years, before being killed by Airgetmar and succeeded by Eochu.

The Lebor Gabála synchronises his reign with that of Artaxerxes II of Persia (404–358). The chronology of Keating's Foras Feasa ar Éirinn dates his reign to 586–577 BC, that of the Annals of the Four Masters to 795–786 BC.

He is given as an ancestor of the Gamarad of Nephin, County Mayo.

Preceded by Art mac Lugdach or Fiacha Tolgrach	High King of Ireland; LGE 5th/4th century BC; FFE 586–577 BC; AFM 795–786 BC	Succeeded by Eochu mac Ailella
