= Cashelmore =

- An Caiseal Mór (Irish)
- Clogher Stone Fort
- Location within Ireland
- 53.9344°N 8.5139°W
- Type: stone ringfort
- Location: Clogher, Monasteraden, County Sligo, Ireland

History
- Built: c. 500–1 BC

Site notes
- Elevation: 88 m (289 ft)
- Height: 2.3 m (7 ft 7 in)
- Area: 0.12 ha (0.30 acres)

National monument of Ireland
- Official name: Cashelmore
- Reference no.: 159

Cashelmore, also called Clogher Stone Fort, is a stone ringfort (cashel) and National Monument located in County Sligo, Ireland.

== Location ==
Cashelmore is located 1.6 km (1 mile) southwest of Monasteraden, to the west of Lough Gara.

== Description ==
The fort has an internal diameter of 26 m (85 ft). The walls are 2.3 m (7 ft 7 in) high and 4.2 m (14 ft) thick.

Five stairways lead to the top of the wall.

The entrance is called the Steward's Gate. There is a mural passage and two souterrains. The souterrains have dry stone walls and are roofed with large stone flags.

== History ==
Cashelmore may have been first settled in the Bronze Age (2000–500 BC). The stone cashel walls are probably early Iron Age (5th–1st century BC), but could be earlier. It could be the Rath Clochair mentioned in the Annals of the Four Masters: 871 BC "Lugaid Íardonn son of Énna Derg, the 41st king of Ireland, was killed by Sírlám son of Finn in the battle of Rath Clochair."

Restoration work took place in the 19th century.
