= Faildergdóit =

High King of Ireland

Faildergdóit (later spelled Faildeargdoid or Ailldeargoid), son of Muinemón, was, according to medieval Irish legend and historical tradition, a High King of Ireland. He succeeded to the throne on the death of his father. He is said to have been the first king in Ireland whose subjects wore gold rings (Old Irish failge) on their hands. He ruled for ten years before being killed, either by Sírna mac Déin, or by his successor Ollom Fotla, whose father, Fíachu Fínscothach, had been killed by Failderdóit's father Muinemón. The chronology of Geoffrey Keating's Foras Feasa ar Éirinn dates his reign to 950–943 BC, that of the Annals of the Four Masters to 1328–1318 BC.

Preceded by Muinemón	High King of Ireland; AFM 1328–1318 BC; FFE 950–943 BC	Succeeded by Ollom Fotla
