= Maen =

Irish royalty (in legend)

Maen, Maoin, Maon or Main, son of Óengus Olmucaid, who, according to medieval legend and tradition, was a High King of Ireland. Óengus Olmucaid in turn was the son of Fíachu Labrainne.

His son was Rothechtaid mac Main, who according to medieval legend and tradition, was a High King of Ireland.
