= Fer Corb =

Fer Corb ("chariot man"), son of Mug Corb, was, according to medieval Irish legend and historical tradition, a High King of Ireland. He came to power after killing his predecessor, and his father's killer, Irereo, in Ulster. He ruled for eleven years, until he was killed by Irereo's son Connla Cáem. The Lebor Gabála Érenn synchronises his reign with that of Ptolemy IV Philopator of Egypt (221–205 BC). The chronology of Geoffrey Keating's Foras Feasa ar Éirinn dates his reign to 330–319 BC, the Annals of the Four Masters to 474–463 BC.

Preceded by Irereo	High King of Ireland; LGE 3rd century BC; FFE 330–319 BC; AFM 474–463 BC	Succeeded by Connla Cáem
