= Congal Cláiringnech =

Congal Cláiringnech ("the cripple"), son of Rudraige, was, according to medieval Irish legend and historical tradition, a king of Ulster and High King of Ireland. He was the brother of Bresal Bó-Díbad, the former High King, who had been killed by Lugaid Luaigne.

While Lugaid Luaigne was High King of Ireland, Congall shared the kingship of Ulster with Fergus mac Léti, ruling the northern half of the province while Fergus ruled the southern half. The Ulstermen objected to being ruled by two kings, and both submitted to the judgement of the High King at Tara as to which should rule the province. Lugaid decided to give the kingship to Fergus, who his daughter Findabair had fallen in love with, and compensate Congal with land, status and gold, but Congal refused and declared war. He was supported by some of the Ulster noblemen, including Fergus mac Róich and Bricriu, as well as allies from the other Irish provinces and from Scotland. Fergus mac Léti also called upon his allies, including Fachtna Fáthach from Ulster, Cet mac Mágach from Connacht and Mesgegra from Leinster, and there were great losses on both sides.

Congal fitted out a fleet and left Ireland for Lochlann (Norway) to seek new allies. He married Beiuda, daughter of king of Lochlann, and, reinforced with 20,000 Scandinavian warriors, set sail again. After making conquests in Britain and gaining further allies there, he returned to Ulster. He learned that Fergus mac Léti was staying at the house of Eochaid Sálbuide, and resolved to storm it. The house was burnt down, but Fergus and Eochaid escaped. Congal decided, rather than ravage his own country, to march on Tara and fight Lugaid Luaigne for the High Kingship of Ireland. A terrible battle was fought between their armies, and Congal met Lugaid on the battlefield and beheaded him. After Congal had installed himself as High King, Fergus mac Léti came to Tara to make peace with him. Congal accepted his overtures, but stripped him of the kingship of Ulster, giving it to his brother Ross Ruad.

Congal ruled Ireland for fifteen or sixteen years, at the end of which he was killed by Lugaid Luaigne's grandson Dui Dallta Dedad. The Lebor Gabála Érenn synchronises his reign with that of Ptolemy XII Auletes (80–51 BC) in Egypt. The chronology of Geoffrey Keating's Foras Feasa ar Éirinn dates his reign to 135–120 BC, that of the Annals of the Four Masters to 184–169 BC.

Preceded by Lugaid Luaigne	High King of Ireland; LGE 1st century BC; FFE 135–120 BC; AFM 184–169 BC	Succeeded by Dui Dallta Dedad
