= Berngal =

Berngal, son of Géde Ollgothach, was, according to medieval Irish legend and historical tradition, a High King of Ireland. He took power after killing his predecessor, cousin and his father's killer, Fíachu Findoilches. He made so much war that there was a shortage of milk and corn - according to one version, only a sack and a half. He ruled for either twenty-one or twelve years, until he was killed by his cousin Ailill, son of Slánoll. The Lebor Gabála Érenn synchronises his reign with that of Deioces of the Medes (694–665 BC). The chronology of Geoffrey Keating's Foras Feasa ar Éirinn dates his reign to 833–831 BC, that of the Annals of the Four Masters to 1209–1197 BC.

Preceded by Fíachu Findoilches	High King of Ireland; LGE Early 7th century BC; FFE 833–831 BC; AFM 1209–1197 BC	Succeeded by Ailill mac Slánuill
