= Muiredach Bolgrach =

Muiredach Bolgrach, son of Siomón Brecc, was, according to medieval Irish legend and historical tradition, a High King of Ireland. He took power after killing his predecessor, and his father's killer, Dui Finn, ruled for 13 months or four years depending on the source consulted, and was then killed by Dui's son Énna Derg. The Lebor Gabála Érenn synchronises his reign with that of Artaxerxes I of Persia (465–424 BC). The chronology of Geoffrey Keating's Foras Feasa ar Éirinn dates his reign to 674–670 BC, that of the Annals of the Four Masters to 894–893 BC. His son was Fíachu Tolgrach.

Preceded by Dui Finn	High King of Ireland; LGE 5th century BC; FFE 674–670 BC; AFM 894–893 BC	Succeeded by Énna Derg
