= Énna Derg =

Énna Derg, son of Dui Finn, was, according to medieval Irish legend and historical tradition, a High King of Ireland, who took power after killing his predecessor, and his father's killer, Muiredach Bolgrach. He was called derg, red, because he had a red face. It is said that coins were first used in Ireland during his reign. He ruled for twelve years, before dying of plague in Sliab Mis, surrounded by a large number of his troops. He was succeeded by his son Lugaid Íardonn. The Lebor Gabála Érenn synchronises his reign with that of Artaxerxes I of Persia (465–424 BC). The chronology of Geoffrey Keating's Foras Feasa ar Éirinn dates his reign to 670–658 BC, that of the Annals of the Four Masters to 893–881 BC.

Preceded by Muiredach Bolgrach	High King of Ireland; LGE 5th century BC; FFE 670–658 BC; AFM 893–881 BC	Succeeded by Lugaid Íardonn
