= Rothechtaid mac Main =

Rothechtaid, son of Maen, son of Óengus Olmucaid, was, according to medieval Irish legend and historical tradition, a High King of Ireland. He came to power by killing the previous incumbent, his grandfather's killer Énna Airgdech, in the battle of Raigne. He ruled for twenty-two years. The Lebor Gabála Érenn gives two versions of his death. In one version, he was killed in single combat in Cruachan by Sétna Airt, who fought to protect his son Fíachu Fínscothach. In the other version, he died of his wounds in Tara. The chronology of Geoffrey Keating's Foras Feasa ar Éirinn dates his reign to 1005–980 BC, that of the Annals of the Four Masters to 1383–1358 BC.

His son was Demal mac Rothechtaid.

Royal titles
Preceded by Énna Airgdech	High King of Ireland; AFM 1383–1358 BC; FFE 1005–980 BC	Succeeded by Sétna Airt
