= Géde Ollgothach =

Géde Ollgothach, son of Ollom Fotla, was, according to medieval Irish legend and historical tradition, a High King of Ireland. He succeeded to the throne on the death of his brother Slánoll. His epithet means "possessing a great voice", and the Lebor Gabála Érenn says during his reign all his subjects had voices as sweet as the strings of a zither. He ruled for eight, or twelve, or seventeen years, before being killed by, according to the Lebor Gabála, the otherwise unknown Fíachu son of Fíadchú; according to Geoffrey Keating and the Annals of the Four Masters, by his nephew and successor Fíachu Findoilches, son of Fínnachta. The chronology of Keating's Foras Feasa ar Éirinn dates his reign to 880–863 BC, that of the Annals of the Four Masters to 1241–1231 BC.

A medieval tract called Cóir Anmann ("The Fitness of Names") says that Géde Ollgothach was another name for Érimón.

According to some texts, he came from the Cruthin dynasty of the Dál nAraidi. He also appears in the Pictish Chronicle as a king of the Picts.

Preceded by Slánoll	High King of Ireland; AFM 1241–1231 BC; FFE 880–863 BC	Succeeded by Fíachu Findoilches
