= Conchobar Abradruad =

Conchobar Abradruad ("red eyelashes"), son of Find File, son of Ros Ruad, son of Fergus Fairgge, son of Nuadu Necht, of the Laigin, was, according to medieval Irish legend and historical tradition, a High King of Ireland. He succeeded to the throne after the death of Lugaid Riab nDerg, and ruled for a year, at the end of which he was killed by Lugaid's son Crimthann Nia Náir. The Lebor Gabála Érenn synchronises his reign with that of the Roman emperor Vespasian (AD 69–79). The chronology of Geoffrey Keating's Foras Feasa ar Éirinn dates his reign to 13–12 BC, that of the Annals of the Four Masters to 9–8 BC.

Preceded by Lugaid Riab nDerg	High King of Ireland; LGE 1st century AD; FFE 13–12 BC; AFM 9–8 BC	Succeeded by LGE Cairbre Cinnchait; FFE/AFM Crimthann Nia Náir
