= Tipraiti Tireach =

Celtic legendary king of Ulster, Ireland

Tipraiti Tireach (136 — 187) spelled with numerous different variations such as Tibraite, Tipraite, Tiobraide, Thilbruidhe and Tiobradhe, was a Celtic legendary King of Ulster according to the Annals of the Four Masters. The Annals also describes Tipraiti Tireach as the founder of Dál nAraidi. He was the son of Mal, a High King of Ireland and a descendant of hero Conall Cernach. Part of the wide Milesian race with a lineage that traces back directly to Míl Espáine, whose son tradition holds, went to Ireland from Hispania in the Iberian Peninsula as part of the "Ulster Cycle".

The Lebor Gabála and the Annals say Tipraiti Tireach defeated and slew Conn of the Hundred Battles, the High King of Ireland for thirty-five years, at the Battle of Tuath Amrois. Keating says Tipraiti sent fifty warriors dressed as women from Emain Macha to kill him at Tara.

== See also ==
- Tubridy
