= Art mac Lugdach =

High King of Ireland

Art, son of Lugaid Lámderg, was, according to medieval Irish legend and historical tradition, a High King of Ireland. He took power after killing his predecessor, and his father's killer, Conaing Bececlach. He ruled for six years, until he was killed by Fíachu Tolgrach and his son Dui Ladrach. According to the Lebor Gabála Érenn, he was succeeded by his son Ailill Finn; Keating and the Four Masters agree he was succeeded by his killer, Fíachu Tolgrach, who was later killed by Ailill Finn. The Lebor Gabála synchronises his reign with that of Darius II of Persia (423–404). The chronology of Keating's Foras Feasa ar Éirinn dates his reign to 599–593 BC, that of the Annals of the Four Masters to 812–806 BC.

Preceded by Conaing Bececlach	High King of Ireland; LGE 5th century BC; FFE 599–593 BC; AFM 812–806 BC	Succeeded by Ailill Finn or Fíachu Tolgrach
