= Eochu Mumu =

Irish legend

- High King of Ireland
- Reign: c. 1500–1480 BC
- Coronation: Hill of Tara
- Predecessor: Fíachu Labrainne
- Successor: Óengus Olmucaid
- Born: unknown Ireland
- Died: c. 1480 BC; Ireland
- House: Milesian
- Father: Eochaid Faebar Glas
- Mother: unknown
- Religion: Celtic polytheism

Eochu Mumu (or Eochaid Mumo, Mumho), son of Mofebis, son of Eochaid Faebar Glas, was, according to medieval Irish legend and historical tradition, a High King of Ireland. According to the Lebor Gabála Érenn he came to power after killing the previous incumbent, Fíachu Labrainne, who had killed his father in battle. The province of Munster is named after him. He ruled for 21 years, fighting many battles against the descendants of Érimón, before he was killed by Fíachu's son Óengus Olmucaid in the battle of Clíu. He would later be avenged by his own son Enna Airgdech.

The Lebor Gabála synchronises his reign with that of Ofratanes in Assyria. The chronology of Geoffrey Keating's Foras Feasa ar Éirinn dates his reign to 1071–1050 BC, that of the Annals of the Four Masters to 1449–1428 BC.

Preceded by Fíachu Labrainne	High King of Ireland; AFM 1449–1428 BC; FFE 1071–1050 BC	Succeeded by Óengus Olmucaid
