= Fíachu Finnolach =

Irish king

Fiacha Finnolach, son of Feradach Finnfechtnach, was, according to medieval Irish legend and historical tradition, a High King of Ireland. He took power after killing his predecessor, Fíatach Finn. He ruled for fifteen, seventeen, or twenty-seven years, depending on the source consulted, after which he, and the freemen of Ireland, were killed in an uprising of aithech-tuatha or "subject peoples", led, according to the Lebor Gabála Érenn and the Annals of the Four Masters, by Elim mac Conrach, or by Cairbre Cinnchait according to Geoffrey Keating. His wife Eithne, daughter of the king of Alba (Scotland), who was pregnant, fled home to Alba, where she gave birth to Fíachu's son, Tuathal Techtmar, who would ultimately return to Ireland to claim the throne. The Lebor Gabála Érenn synchronises his reign with that of the Roman emperor Nerva (AD 96–98). The chronology of Geoffrey Keating's Foras Feasa ar Éirinn dates his reign to AD 28–55, that of the Annals of the Four Masters to AD 39–56.

Preceded by Fíatach Finn	High King of Ireland; LGE 1st century AD; FFE AD 28–55; AFM AD 39–56	Succeeded by LGE/AFM Elim mac Conrach; FFE Cairbre Cinnchait
