= Fergus mac Léti =

Legendary king of Ulster

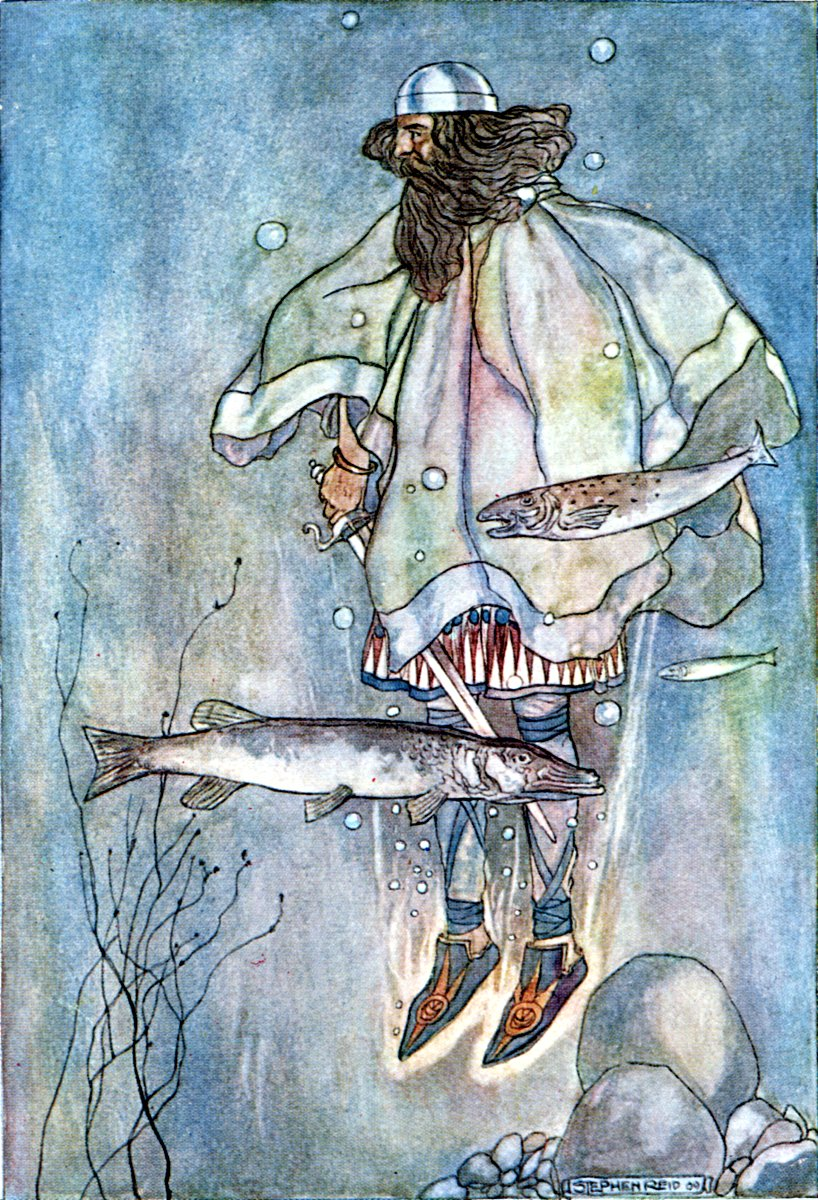
"Fergus goes down into the lake", illustration by Stephen Reid in T. W. Rolleston's The High Deeds of Finn (1910)

Fergus mac Léti (also mac Léte, mac Léide, mac Leda) was, according to Irish legend and traditional history, a king of Ulster. His place in the traditional chronology is not certain – according to some sources, he was a contemporary of the High King Conn of the Hundred Battles, in others of Lugaid Luaigne, Congal Cláiringnech, Dui Dallta Dedad and Fachtna Fáthach.

== Appearances ==
According to the Caithréim Conghail Cláiringhnigh (Martial Career of Congal Cláiringnech), while Lugaid Luaigne was High King of Ireland, Fergus ruled the southern half of Ulster while Congal Cláiringnech ruled the northern half. The Ulaid objected to having two kings, and the High King was asked to judge which of them should be sole ruler of the province. Lugaid chose Fergus, and gave him his daughter Findabair in marriage. Congal refused to accept this and declared war. After trying and failing to overthrow Fergus, he marched on Tara and defeated and beheaded Lugaid in battle. Installing himself as High King, he deposed Fergus as king of Ulster, putting his own brother Ross Ruad in his place. In the reign of Fachtna Fáthach, Ross was killed in the Battle of Lough Foyle, and Fergus was made king of Ulster again.

In the Saga of Fergus mac Léti, he encounters water-sprites called lúchorpáin or "little bodies"; this is thought to be the earliest known references to leprechauns. The creatures try to drag Fergus into the sea while he is asleep, but the cold water wakes him and he seizes them. In exchange for their freedom the lúchorpáin grant him three wishes, one of which is to gain the ability to breathe underwater. This ability will work anywhere but Loch Rudraige (Dundrum Bay) in Ulster. He attempts to swim there anyway, and encounters a sea-monster called Muirdris, and his face is permanently contorted in terror. This disfigurement would disqualify him from the kingship, but the Ulstermen do not want to depose him, so they ban mirrors from his presence so he will never learn of his deformity. Seven years later he whips a serving girl, who in anger reveals the truth to him. Fergus returns to Loch Rudraige in search of the sea-monster, and after a two-day battle that turns the sea red with blood, kills it, before dying of exhaustion.

His kingship of Ulster, his association with the sword Caladbolg and his death in water have led some to identify him as a double of the Ulster Cycle character Fergus mac Róich, although the two characters appear together in the Caithréim Conghail Cláiringhnigh as enemies.

In the Disney movie Darby O'Gill and the Little People, the leprechaun King Brian Connors surrounds himself with relics of legendary Irish royalty, declaring the throne he sits upon is that of "Fergus Mac Leda", though he erroneously refers to Fergus as the ancient "High King of all Ireland" instead of just Ulster. Similarly to the lúchorpáin of Fergus mac Leti's legend, however, the leprechauns in the movie are seen specifically granting three wishes when caught.
