= Airgetmar =

High King of Ireland
- Predecessor: Eochu mac Ailella
- Successor: Dui Ladrach

Airgetmar, son of Sirlám, was, according to medieval Irish legend and historical tradition, a High King of Ireland. The Lebor Gabála Érenn says that, during the reign of Ailill Finn, he killed Fíachu Tolgrach in battle, but was forced into exile overseas by Ailill's son Eochu, Lugaid son of Eochu Fíadmuine, and the men of Munster. He returned to Ireland after seven years, and, with the help of Dui Ladrach, killed Ailill. Eochu became king, but Airgetmar and Dui soon killed him as well, and Airgetmar took power.

Geoffrey Keating tells a slightly different story of Airgetmar's accession. Eochu withstood Airgetmar, made an alliance with Dui and ruled for seven years, but Dui treacherously killed him at a meeting and Airgetmar took the throne.

He ruled for thirty years (according to the Lebor Gabála and the Annals of the Four Masters), or twenty-three or thirty-eight years (according to Keating), after which he was killed by Dui and Eochu's son Lugaid Laigdech. Dui, who had now had a hand in the killing of four High Kings, took the throne.

The Lebor Gabála synchronises his reign with that of Artaxerxes III of Persia (358–338 BC). The chronology of Keating's Foras Feasa ar Éirinn dates his reign to 570–547 BC, that of the Annals of the Four Masters to 778–748 BC.

Preceded by Eochu mac Ailella	High King of Ireland; LGE 4th century BC; FFE 570–547 BC; AFM 778–748 BC	Succeeded by Dui Ladrach
