= Lugaid Riab nDerg =

Medieval Irish sovereign

Lugaid Riab nDerg ("the red-striped") or Réoderg ("Red Sky"), son of the three findemna, triplet sons of Eochu Feidlech, and their sister Clothru was, according to medieval Irish legend and historical tradition, a High King of Ireland.

== Conception ==
Lugaid was conceived of incest. The night before the three findemna, Bres, Nár and Lothar, made war for the High Kingship against their father in the Battle of Druimm Criaich, their sister Clothru, concerned that her brothers could die without heirs, seduced all three of them, and a son, Lugaid, was conceived. His epithet came from two red stripes around his neck and waist, dividing him into three: above the neck he resembled Nár; from the neck to the waist he resembled Bres; and from the waist down he resembled Lothar. Incest features further in Lugaid's story: he slept with Clothru himself, conceiving Crimthann Nia Náir.

== Rise to power ==
The Lebor Gabála Érenn says he came to power after a five-year interregnum following the death of Conaire Mór (six years according to the Annals of the Four Masters). His foster-father, the Ulster hero Cúchulainn, split the Lia Fáil (coronation stone at Tara which roared when the rightful king stood or sat on it) with his sword when it failed to roar under Lugaid. It never roared again except under Conn of the Hundred Battles.

== Conflicts ==
The wizard of Ethne, daughter of Eochu Feidlech, prophesied that the son of Ethne's sister Clothru would kill her (Ethne). Therefore, Ethne fled to Cruachan in the East to give birth to her son, but Lugaid chased her there and drowned her; he then cut her son, Furbaide Fer-benn (described as having two horns on his temples) from her womb. Later at the age of 17 Furbaide sought revenge against Lugaid for his mother's death, and killed Clothru, for which Lugaid killed Furbaide on a mountaintop called Sliab Uillean. Certain elements of this story bear a resemblance to the prophecy of Lugh Lamhfhada, son of Ethniu, who was predicted to kill his grandfather Balor of the Evil-Eye.

== Marriage ==
His wife was Derbforgaill, a daughter of the king of Lochlann (Scandinavia), who had fallen in love with Cúchulainn from afar and come to Ireland with a handmaiden in the form of a pair of swans, linked by a golden chain, to seek him out. Cúchulainn and Lugaid were at Loch Cuan (Strangford Lough) and saw them fly past. Cúchulainn, at Lugaid's urging, shot a slingstone which hit Derbforgaill, penetrating her womb, and the two women fell on the beach in human form. Cúchulainn saved Derbforgaill's life by sucking the stone from her side, and she declared her love for him, but because he had sucked her side he could not marry her – evidently, he had violated some geis or taboo. Instead, he gave her to Lugaid. They married and had children.

== Deaths of Derbforgaill and Lugaid ==
One day in deep winter, the men of Ulster made pillars of snow, and the women competed to see who could urinate the deepest into the pillar and prove herself the most desirable to men. Derbforgaill's urine reached the ground, and the other women, out of jealousy, attacked and mutilated her, gouging out her eyes and cutting off her nose, ears, and hair. Lugaid noticed that the snow on the roof of her house had not melted, and realised she was close to death. He and Cúchulainn rushed to the house, but Derbforgaill died shortly after they arrived, and Lugaid died of grief. Cúchulainn avenged them by demolishing the house the women were inside, killing 150 of them.

== Alternatives ==
For Lugaid Réoderg, an alternative tradition exists that he met his death at the hands of the Trí Rúadchinn Laigen, the "Three Reds of the Laigin" also involved in the death of Conaire Mór. Lucius Gwynn suggested that what may have happened is an earlier King of Tara known as Lugaid Réoderg may have become confused with a separate and minor character from the Ulster Cycle associated with Cúchulainn. T. F. O'Rahilly, on the other hand, believed the epithet Riab nDerg to simply be a corruption of the earlier Réoderg, meaning something like "of the red sky", and does not believe them to be distinct legendary figures (see below).

== Further analysis ==
The view advanced by O'Rahilly was that Lugaid Riab nDerg is yet another emanation of the heroic mytho-dynastic figure Lugaid, closely associated with the prehistoric Érainn, a population of late Iron Age Ireland who provide Irish legend with its earliest known Kings of Tara. One of their most notable representatives in that office is Lugaid's immediate predecessor, Conaire Mór.

Specifically, O'Rahilly believed Lugaid Riab nDerg to be the double of Lugaid mac Con Roí, whose alternative epithet was mac Trí Con "son of Three Hounds", and who himself is to some extent identical with Lugaid Mac Con. The last, usually known simply as Mac Con "Hound's Son", is an Érainn king matching Conaire Mór in importance in Irish legend. Another is Cú Roí mac Dáire, or simply Dáire, father of Lugaid mac Con Roí. A 'fourth' Lugaid and 'ancestor' of Mac Con was Lugaid Loígde.

== Lugaid's reign ==
He had ruled for twenty, twenty-five or twenty-six years. The Lebor Gabála synchronises his reign with that of the Roman emperor Claudius (AD 41–54). The chronology of Geoffrey Keating's Foras Feasa ar Éirinn dates his reign to 33–13 BC, that of the Annals of the Four Masters to 33–9 BC.

Preceded by Conaire Mór	High King of Ireland; LGE 1st century AD; FFE 33–13 BC; AFM 33–9 BC	Succeeded by Conchobar Abradruad
