= Fiachan of Lismore =

Medieval saint of Munster

Saint Fiachna
- Born: Desies, Munster
- Residence: Lismore, County Waterford, Munster
- Died: 630
- Feast: 29 April

Saint Fiachna (or Fiachan, Fiachina, Fianchne; died 630) was an early Irish monk who was venerated as a saint. His feast day is 29 April.

== Identity ==
The name Fiachna (or Fiachra, Fiacha, Fiachnae, Fiach, Fechín, Feichín) comes from the Old Irish fiach, which means raven. It was given to several legendary and early historical characters. Fiachna is mentioned as a disciple of Mo Chutu of Lismore (Carthagh the younger) in Lismore, County Waterford, in the Life of St. Mochuda of Lismore. Saint Fiachna or Fechno of Agha-luing may be this saint, or may be another whose feast day in 13 March.

== Butler's account ==
The hagiographer Alban Butler wrote,

April 29

St. Fiachna, Confessor in Ireland

HE was a native of Desies, in Munster, a monk of Lismore, and disciple of St. Carthagh the younger, in 630. By the most perfect spirit of obedience he laid the foundation of a most sublime gift of prayer and all virtue. He is titular saint of the parish of Kill-Fiachna, in the diocess of Ardfert. See Engus in Chron. and Colgan, MSS. ad 29 Apr.

== Life of St. Mochuda of Lismore ==
A passage in the Life of St. Mochuda of Lismore refers to Fiachna:

Mochuda had in his monastery twelve exceedingly perfect disciples [including] ... Fachtna Coinceann [Fiachna or Fiochrae] ... The virtue of these monks surpassed belief and Mochuda wished to mitigate their austerities before their death. He therefore built separate cells for them that they might have some comfort in their old age as a reward for their virtue in youth; moreover he predicted blessings for them...To a second disciple, Fiachna, Mochuda said:--"Your resurrection will not be in this place though I have made you a cell here; you will have three further abiding places, nevertheless it will be with your own companion, Aodhan, that your remains will rest and your resurrection will be in the territory of Ui Torna, and it is from you that the place will get its name." For this Aodhan alluded to Mochuda likewise built another cell in the land of Ui Torna close by Slieve Luachra, and speaking prophetically he said to him: "The remains of your fellow-disciple, Fiachna, will be carried to you hither and from him will this place be named." That statement has been verified, for the church is now called Cill-Fiachna and it was first called Cill-Aeghain. Concerning other persons, Mochuda prophesied various other things, all of them have come to pass.

== See also ==
- Féchín of Fore

== Sources ==
- Butler, Alban (1821), The lives of the fathers, martyrs, and other principal saints, p. 320
- "Fiachna", name doctor
- O'Hanlon, John (1873), Lives of the Irish saints
- Saint Mochuda, Dennis McCarthy (ed.), The Life of St. Mochuda of Lismore, Translated from the Irish with an introduction by Rev. P. Power, M.R.I.A. University College, Cork – via Fullbooks.com
