= Énna Airgdech =

Legendary High King of Ireland, ~1500 BCE

Énna Airgdech ('rich in silver', also spelled Airgthech, Airgtheach), son of Eochu Mumu, was, according to medieval Irish legend and historical tradition, a High King of Ireland. He came to power after killing the previous incumbent and his father's killer, Óengus Olmucaid, in the battle of Carman. He is said to have made silver shields for his nobles in Argatros. He reigned for twenty-seven or twenty-eight years, before being killed by Óengus' grandson Rothechtaid mac Main in the battle of Raigne. The chronology of Geoffrey Keating's Foras Feasa ar Éirinn dates his reign to 1032–1005 BC, that of the Annals of the Four Masters to 1537–1533 BC.

Preceded by Óengus Olmucaid	High King of Ireland; AFM 1410–1383 BC; FFE 1032–1005 BC	Succeeded by Rothechtaid mac Main
