= Dui Finn =

Dui Finn, son of Sétna Innarraid, was, according to medieval Irish legend and historical tradition, a High King of Ireland. He took power after killing his predecessor, and his father's killer, Siomón Brecc. He ruled for ten years, before he was killed by Siomón's son Muiredach Bolgrach. The Lebor Gabála Érenn synchronises his reign with those of Xerxes I (485–465 BC) and Artaxerxes I (465–424 BC) of Persia. The chronology of Geoffrey Keating's Foras Feasa ar Éirinn dates his reign to 679–674 BC, that of the Annals of the Four Masters to 904–894 BC.

Preceded by Siomón Brecc	High King of Ireland; LGE 5th century BC; FFE 679–674 BC; AFM 904–894 BC	Succeeded by Muiredach Bolgrach
