= Clanna Rudraige =

Ancient tribe according to Irish mythology

The Clanna Rudraige (modern Irish: Clanna Rudhraighe), Anglicised as Clanna Rory, is according to Irish mythology an ancient tribe that ruled the ancient province of Ulaid in Ireland. The people that lived in this province, also called the Ulaid, are claimed as being descended from the Clanna Rudraige and in medieval texts are often referred to by that name.

== Etymology ==
The Clanna Rudraige may mean "descendants of Rudraige" (a personal name) or "descendants of the Rudraige", a population name like Dartraighe or Osraige. An alternate spelling found in medieval texts is Clan na Rudraige, which would lean towards the latter.

It is suggested that rud is related to ruad meaning "red", which would give Rudraige the meaning "red people". Red also features prominently in the Ulster Cycle of legends: there is the tale of Togail Bruidne Dá Derga, with Dá Derga meaning "red god"; the term Cróeb Ruad translates as Red Branch, a royal house near the Ulaid capital Emain Macha; and the Red Branch Knights, which was a military order wholly in the service of ancient Ulaid.

The Ulster Cycle of Irish mythology is called An Rúraíocht ([ə ˈɾˠuːɾˠiːxt̪ˠ]) in Irish.

== Origins ==
The origins and background of the Clanna Rudraige comes from medieval texts, most of which combined myth, pseudo-history and possible real events into an elaborate and largely fabricated legendary history. According to one of these works, the Annals of the Four Masters, the Clanna Rudraige are descended from Rudraige mac Sithrigi, a prince of the province of Ulaid who became High King of Ireland sometime between the 1st and 3rd centuries BC.

During the reign of Eochu Feidlech as High King, the provinces of Ireland are said to have been turned into kingdoms, with the ruler of each tribe who possessed a province becoming a king, as such the first king of Ulster was Fergus mac Léti, grandson of Rudraige mac Sithrigi. Fergus' cousin Conchobar mac Nessa was king of Ulaid during the Ulster Cycle of Irish mythology. According to these medieval texts, in the fourth century the Three Collas invaded Ulaid.

The Three Collas and their armies fought seven battles in a week against the Ulaid at Achaidh Leithdeircc, killing Fergus Foga, king of Ulster, in the seventh battle. The Collas burnt Emain Macha, the capital of Ulaid, after which it was abandoned, and seized substantial territories in mid-Ulster. This is thought to be the origin of the medieval over-kingdom of Airgíalla.
