= Eithne =

Eithne (Irish: [ˈɛhnʲə]) is a female personal name of Irish origin, meaning "kernel" or "grain". Other spellings and earlier forms include Ethnea, Ethlend, Ethnen, Ethlenn, Ethnenn, Eithene, Ethne, Aithne, Enya, Ena, Edna, Etney, Eithnenn, Eithlenn, Eithna, Ethni, Edlend, Edlenn.

The name is popular in Ireland, and is borne by a variety of historical and legendary figures. It has also been Anglicized with the etymologically unrelated name Edna.

== Ancient ==
- Ethniu, daughter of Balor and mother of Lug in Irish mythology
- Eithne and Sodelb, Leinster saints
- Eithne, daughter of the king of Alba, wife of the High King Fiacha Finnfolaidh and mother of Tuathal Teachtmhar
- Eithne, saint and mother of Saint Columba
- Eithne and Fidelma, princesses and saints baptised by St. Patrick
- Eithne and Daorchaorthainn, female saints associated with Tullow
- Eithne Tháebfhota, third wife of Conn Cétchathach

== Modern ==
- Eithne Coyle (1897–1985), Irish republican activist
- Eithne Farry, former literary editor of Elle
- Eithne FitzGerald (born 1950), Irish economist and former Labour Party politician
- Eithne Hannigan, Irish musician and actress who played one of five Dots in the children's TV show Playbus (later Playdays)
- Eithne Ní Uallacháin (1957–1999), Irish singer and musician
- Eithne Walls, a physician and former dancer, who danced with the popular Riverdance group on Broadway, died in the Air France Flight 447 crash on 1 June 2009
- Eithne "Enya" Pádraigín Ní Bhraonáin (born 1961), Irish singer and composer
- LÉ Eithne, a ship in the Irish Naval Service

== See also ==
- List of Irish-language given names
