= Dui Dallta Dedad =

Dui Dallta Dedad ("foster-son of Deda mac Sin"), son of Cairpre Lusc, son of Lugaid Luaigne, was, according to medieval Irish legend and historical tradition, a High King of Ireland. He took power after killing his predecessor, and his grandfather's killer, Congal Cláiringnech, and ruled for ten years, at the end of which he was killed by Fachtna Fáthach in the battle of Árd Brestine. The Lebor Gabála Érenn synchronises his reign with that of Ptolemy XII Auletes (80–51 BC) in Egypt and the civil war between Pompey and Caesar in Rome (49 BC). The chronology of Geoffrey Keating's Foras Feasa ar Éirinn dates his reign to 120–110 BC, that of the Annals of the Four Masters to 169–159 BC.

Preceded by Congal Cláiringnech	High King of Ireland; LGE 1st century BC; FFE 120–110 BC; AFM 169–159 BC	Succeeded by Fachtna Fáthach
