= Ailill mac Slánuill =

Mythical High King of Ireland

Ailill (or Oilioll), son of Slánoll, was, according to medieval Irish legend and historical tradition, a High King of Ireland; scholars now believe these kings to be a pseudohistorical construct of the eighth century AD, a projection into the distant past of a political entity which did not become a reality until Maelseachlainn I. He took power after killing his cousin Berngal. He ruled for twelve, fifteen or sixteen years, according to various versions of the Lebor Gabála Érenn (Geoffrey Keating and the Four Masters agree on sixteen) before he was killed by Sírna Sáeglach, a great-grandson of Rothechtaid mac Main. The Lebor Gabála synchronises his reign with that of Deioces of the Medes (694-665 BC). The chronology of Keating's Foras Feasa ar Éirinn dates his reign to 831–815 BC, that of the Annals of the Four Masters to 1197–1181 BC.

Preceded by Berngal	High King of Ireland; LGE Early 7th century BC; FFE 831–815 BC; AFM 1197–1181 BC	Succeeded by Sírna Sáeglach
