= Tubridy =

Clan from Munster, Ireland

You may be searching for Ryan Tubridy or the following programmes associated with him: Tubridy Tonight (RTÉ One), The Tubridy Show (RTÉ Radio 1), Tubridy (radio show) (RTÉ 2fm).

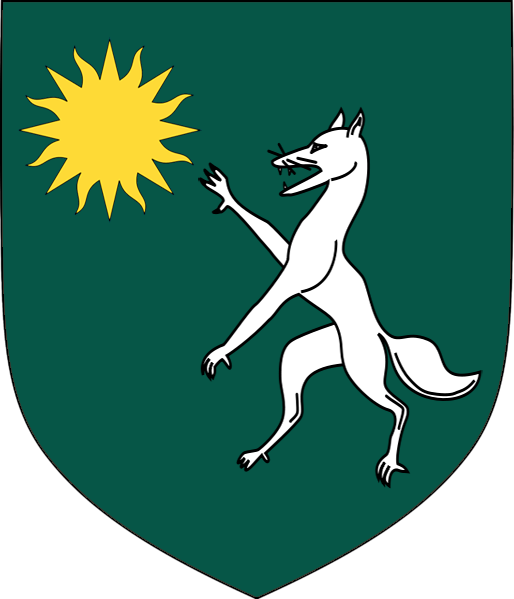
Ó Tiobraide.

Tubridy (Irish: Ó Tiobraide), less commonly known as Tubrid and Tuberty, is a Gaelic Irish clan from Munster. The sept is most common along the West Coast of County Clare, but has also had some presence in County Waterford and County Tipperary. The Tubridys of Thomond are thought to have originated as scribes, as a sept of the Dál gCais, kindred to clans such as the O'Brien, O'Grady and MacNamara. The name means "descendant of Tiobraide", with the Gaelic language word tiobraid meaning "a well". Although to this day, Ireland remains the core location for the clan, it has also spread in diaspora to Great Britain, the United States, Australia, New Zealand and Canada since the 19th century.

== Naming conventions ==
Male	Daughter	Wife (Long)	Wife (Short)
Ó Tiobraide	Ní Thiobraide	Bean Uí Thiobraide	Uí Thiobraide

== History ==
=== Annals of the Four Masters ===
Recorded reference for the name can be found in the Annals of the Four Masters, in relation to Tipraiti Tireach who was a legendary King of Ulster, living out his life between 136 and 187 AD according to the Annals. Tipraiti Tirech himself came from a long line of nobles, his father was Mal mac Rochride one of the High Kings of Ireland; the Annals describes them as part of the Milesian race with a lineage that traces back directly to Míl Espáine, whose son tradition holds, came to Ireland from Hispania in the Iberian Peninsula as part of the "Ulster Cycle". The Annals also describes Tipraiti Tireach as the founder of Dál nAraidi.

=== Potential etymology and development ===
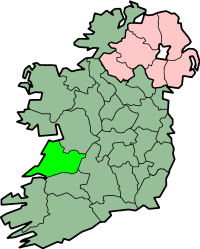
Tubridy is found in County Clare.

Genealogical theories abound as to the origins of the surname. In relation to the word tiobraide some genealogists have speculated that the surname could be topographical in origin, relating to a person who lived by a well, possibly a holy well and probably charged others to use it. There are numerous sacred wells in Ireland, dating back to both pagan and early Christian periods, an example is Tubrid Well at Millstreet relating to Saint Ita who is nicknamed the "Brigid of Munster".

Just before the 9th century, the name appeared in the form of Tipraiti mac Taidg who was the King of Connacht from the years 782 until 786. The name is present in the Annals of Ulster in relation to men holding a religious office within the Catholic Church. Examples of its usage within these Annals are in relation to men such as Oengusa filii Tipraiti, an abbot and author of a Latin hymn Martine te deprecor in honour of St Martin of Tours during 697, others include Tipraiti nepos Baithenaig and Tipraiti Ban also abbots.

The name then began to develop from its original Latin language form, through the same root, into Tipraite. Its development next took it through O' Tipraite and Ua Tibraide then as evident in the Great Book of Lecan and the Book of Ballymote from the 14th century. The name is recorded in the Justiciary Rolls of County Carlow of 1311 in the form of a person named Fiachra O' Tybryth, this was during the reign of king Edward II of England, Lord of Ireland with the introduction of personal tax for citizens. During the 16th century with linguistic developments the more modern spellings of Tubridd, Tubritt, Tubbred, and Tibrud are in clearer evidence.

=== Wider distribution ===
Since the 19th century, likely due to The Great Hunger, the name Tubridy spread out from County Clare into the New World as well as across the Irish Sea to Great Britain. The Tubridys were one of numerous Western Ireland families linked to a much larger myth developed in the New World, in relation to the Spanish Armada's sinking off the coast of County Clare in 1588, known as the Black Irish myth (a reference to black hair colour in some Caucasian Irish people). In the myth specifically related to the Tubridys the tale says, a Spaniard who survived the sinking was swept ashore the West Coast of Clare, was given refuge by a woman surnamed O'Riada, hiding in a dry well near her house. As the man could not speak either English or Irish, he was known as "O'Tiobraide", meaning in English "of the well of Reidy(O'Riada)". Modern genetic tests show a strong connection between Irish people and the Basques, with the gene patterns passed down through the male line of the two described as "strikingly similar".

== Notable people with the name ==
- Tipraiti Tireach, King of Ulster, son of Mal
- Tipraiti mac Taidg, King of Connacht
- David Tubridy (born 1987), Gaelic footballer
- Michael Tubridy (born 1935), Irish musician and step dancer
- Captain Michael Tubridy (1923-1954), Gaelic footballer and international showjumper
- Ryan Tubridy (born 1973), Irish broadcaster
- Seán Tubridy (1897–1939), Irish politician
- Tommy Tubridy, Gaelic footballer and father of David
