= Sedna =

Sedna most commonly refers to:

- Sedna (dwarf planet), a trans-Neptunian dwarf planet
- Sedna (mythology), the Inuit goddess after whom said dwarf planet is named.

Sedna may also refer to:

- Sedna (beverage), a tonic wine, formerly made in Belfast
- Sedna (database), a native XML database
- Doriprismatica sedna, a species of nudibranch
- Sedna Finance, a structured investment vehicle
- Sedna Planitia, a landform on Venus
- Sedna pirata, a species of solifuge, and its monotypic genus Sedna
- Sedna IV, a ship
- Sedna Desgagnés, a cargo ship

== See also ==
- Sednoid, a group of trans-Neptunian objects in the Solar System
- Sétna (disambiguation)
