= Túathal Techtmar =

Legendary high king of Ireland

Túathal Techtmar (Old Irish: [ˈt̪uːa̯θal ˈt̠ʲext̪β̃aɾ]; 'the legitimate'), son of Fíachu Finnolach, was a High King of Ireland, according to medieval Irish legend and historical tradition. He is said to be the ancestor of the Uí Néill and Connachta dynasties through his grandson Conn of the Hundred Battles. The name may also have originally referred to an eponymous deity, possibly even a local version of the Gaulish Toutatis.

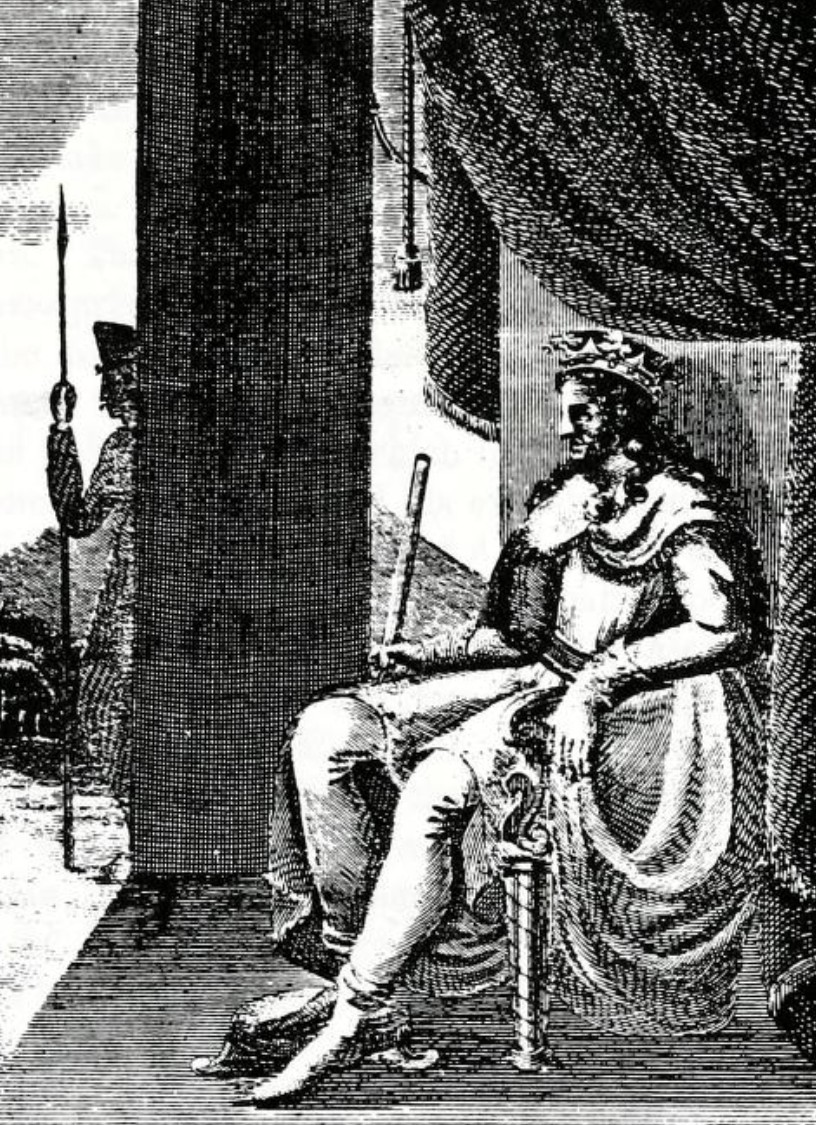
Depiction of Tuathal Techtmar from 'History of the clan O'Toole and other Leinster septs'

== Legend ==
Túathal was the son of a former High King deposed by an uprising of "subject peoples" who returned at the head of an army to reclaim his father's throne. The oldest source for Túathal's story, a 9th-century poem by Mael Mura of Othain, says that his father, Fíacha Finnolach, was overthrown by the four provincial kings, Elim mac Conrach of Ulster, Sanb (son of Cet mac Mágach) of Connacht, Foirbre of Munster and Eochaid Ainchenn of Leinster, and that it was Elim who took the High Kingship. During his rule, Ireland suffered famine as God punished this rejection of legitimate kingship. Túathal, aided by the brothers Fiacha Cassán and Findmall and their 600 men, marched on Tara and defeated Elim in battle at the hill of Achall. He then won battles against the Ligmuini, the Gailióin, the Fir Bolg, the Fir Domnann, the Ulaid, the Muma, the Fir Ól nÉcmacht and the Érainn, and assembled the Irish nobility at Tara to make them swear allegiance to him and his descendants.

Later versions of the story suppress the involvement of the provincial nobility in the revolt, making the "subject peoples" the peasants of Ireland. The Lebor Gabála Érenn adds the detail of Túathal's exile. His mother, Eithne Imgel, daughter of the king of Alba (originally meaning Britain, later Scotland), was pregnant when Fíachu was overthrown, and fled to her homeland where she gave birth to Túathal. Twenty years later, Túathal and his mother returned to Ireland, joined up with Fiacha Cassán and Findmall, and marched on Tara to take the kingship.

The Annals of the Four Masters features a similar revolt a few generations earlier, led by Cairbre Cinnchait, against the High King Crimthann Nia Náir. On this occasion, Crimthann's son Feradach Finnfechtnach is the future king who escaped in his mother's womb, although the Annals claim he returned to reclaim his throne only five years later. The story repeats itself a few generations later with Elim's revolt against Fíachu, and the exile and return of Túathal. Geoffrey Keating harmonises the two revolts into one. He has Crimthann hand the throne directly to his son, Feradach, and makes Cairbre Cinnchait, whose ancestry he traces to the Fir Bolg, the leader of the revolt that overthrew Fíachu, killing him at a feast. The pregnant Eithne flees as in the other sources. Cairbre rules for five years, dies of plague and is succeeded by Elim. After Elim had ruled for twenty years, the 20- or 25-year-old Túathal was prevailed upon to return. He landed with his forces at Inber Domnainn (Malahide Bay). Joining up with Fiacha Cassán and Findmall and their marauders, he marched on Tara where he was declared king. Elim gave battle at the hill of Achall near Tara, but was defeated and killed.

Túathal fought 25 battles against Ulster, 25 against Leinster, 25 against Connacht and 35 against Munster. The whole country subdued, he convened a conference at Tara, where he established laws and annexed territory from each of the four provinces to create the central province of Míde (Meath) around Tara as the High King's territory. He built four fortresses in Meath: Tlachtga, where the druids sacrificed on the eve of Samhain, on land taken from Munster; Uisneach, where the festival of Beltaine was celebrated, on land from Connacht; Tailtiu, where Lughnasadh was celebrated, on land from Ulster; and Tara, on land from Leinster.

He went on to make war on Leinster, burning the stronghold of Aillen (Dún Ailinne) and imposing the bórama, a heavy tribute of cattle, on the province. One story says this was because the king of Leinster, Eochaid Ainchenn, had married Túathal's daughter Dairine, but told Túathal she had died and so was given his other daughter, Fithir. When Fithir discovered Dairine was still alive, she died of shame, and when Dairine saw Fithir dead, she died of grief.

Túathal, or his wife Baine, is reputed to have built Ráth Mór, an Iron Age hillfort in the earthwork complex at Clogher, County Tyrone. He died in battle against Mal mac Rochride, king of Ulster, at Mag Line (Moylinny near Larne, County Antrim). His son, Fedlimid Rechtmar, later avenged him.

== Historical context ==
=== Dates ===
The Annals of the Four Masters gives the date of Túathal's exile as AD 56, his return as 76 and his death as 106. Geoffrey Keating's Foras Feasa ar Érinn broadly agrees, dating his exile to 55, his return to 80 and his death to 100. The Lebor Gabála Érenn places him a little later, synchronising his exile with the reign of the Roman emperor Domitian (81–96), his return early in the reign of Hadrian (122–138) and his death in the reign of Antoninus Pius (138–161).

=== The first of the Goidels? ===
The scholar T. F. O'Rahilly suggested that, as in many such "returned exile" stories, Túathal represented an entirely foreign invasion which established a dynasty in Ireland, whose dynastic propagandists fabricated an Irish origin for him to give him some spurious legitimacy. In fact, he proposed that Túathal's story, pushed back to the 1st or 2nd century BC, represented the invasion of the Goidels, who established themselves over the earlier populations and introduced the Q-Celtic language that would become Irish, and that their genealogists incorporated all Irish dynasties, Goidelic or otherwise, and their ancestor deities into a pedigree stretching back over a thousand years to the fictitious Míl Espáine.

Professor Dáithí Ó hÓgáin reckoned his Celtic name was Teutovalos ('tribe-ruler') and he was a great leader of the northern branch of the Venii tribe, or the 'people of Condos', who overthrew the kingship of the Lagini at Tara. When the genealogies were written a few centuries later, his name was noted as 'Tuathal', and the epithet teachtmhar, a Celtic compound meaning 'appropriator of wealth' was added, referring to his followers' large-scale raids on the British coast. The Venii's special designation for themselves became Gaídhil, i.e. Goidels, and their principal groups were called Connachta and Eoghanacht.

=== Romans in Ireland? ===
Taking the native dating as broadly accurate, another theory has emerged. The Roman historian Tacitus mentions that Agricola, while governor of Roman Britain (AD 78–84), entertained an exiled Irish prince, thinking to use him as a pretext for a possible conquest of Ireland. Neither Agricola nor his successors ever conquered Ireland, but in recent years archaeology has challenged the belief that the Romans never set foot on the island. Roman and Romano-British artefacts have been found primarily in Leinster, notably a fortified site on the promontory of Drumanagh, fifteen miles north of Dublin, and burials on the nearby island of Lambay, both close to where Túathal is supposed to have landed, and other sites associated with Túathal such as Tara and Clogher. However, whether this is evidence of trade, diplomacy, or military activity is a matter of controversy. It is possible that the Romans may have given support to Túathal, or someone like him, to regain his throne in the interests of having a friendly neighbour who could restrain Irish raiding. The 2nd-century Roman poet Juvenal, who may have served in Britain under Agricola, wrote that "arms had been taken beyond the shores of Ireland", and the coincidence of dates is striking.

== Family tree ==
Feradach Finnfechtnach
Fíachu Finnolach	Eithne Imgel
Túathal Techtmar	Baine
Dairine	Eochaid Ainchenn	Fithir	Fedlimid Rechtmar
Conn Cétchathach	Eochaid Finn	Fiacha Suigde
Uí Néill	Connachta	*	*	Dal Fiachrach Suighe

== See also ==
- Hibernia
- Drumanagh
- Hiberno-Roman relations

Preceded by Elim mac Conrach	High King of Ireland; LGE 2nd century AD; FFE AD 80–100; AFM AD 76–106	Succeeded by Mal mac Rochride
