= Clogher (disambiguation) =

Clogher is a village in County Tyrone, Northern Ireland, seat of a cathedral, and former parliamentary borough.

Clogher (Irish for 'stony place') may also refer to several other things in the island of Ireland:

== County Tyrone area ==
- Clogher (Parliament of Ireland constituency), abolished 1800
- Clogher (barony), a barony
- Bishop of Clogher, post-mediaeval title
  - Diocese of Clogher (Roman Catholic), modern diocese
  - Diocese of Clogher (Church of Ireland), modern diocese
- Clogher Éire Óg, a Gaelic Athletic Association club
- Baron Clogher, subsidiary title of Terence Lenagh, Earl of Clanconnell in the Peerage of Ireland

== Elsewhere in Ireland ==
- Clogherhead or Clogher, a village in County Louth
- Several townlands in County Mayo; see List of townlands of County Mayo
- Clogher, a townland in County Monaghan; see List of townlands of County Monaghan
- Clogher, Noughaval, a townland in Noughaval (civil parish), barony of Kilkenny West, County Westmeath
- Cashelmore or Clogher Stone Fort, stone ringfort in County Sligo

== See also ==
- Kiltyclogher, a village in County Leitrim
