= Crimthann Nia Náir =

Medieval Irish king

Crimthann Nia Náir (nephew of Nár), son of Lugaid Riab nDerg, was, according to medieval Irish legend and historical tradition, a High King of Ireland. Lugaid is said to have fathered him on his own mother, Clothru, daughter of Eochu Feidlech. Clothru was thus both his mother and his grandmother.

The Lebor Gabála Érenn says he overthrew the High King Conchobar Abradruad, but does not say he became High King himself - Conchobar was succeeded by Cairbre Cinnchait. Geoffrey Keating and the Annals of the Four Masters agree that Crimthann succeeded Conchobar as High King and ruled for sixteen years. He is said to have gone on a voyage with his aunt Nár, a fairy woman, for a month and a fortnight, and returned with treasures including a gilded chariot, a golden fidchell board, a gold-embroidered cloak, a sword inlaid with gold serpents, a silver-embossed shield, a spear and a sling which never missed their mark, and two greyhounds with a silver chain between them. Soon after he returned he fell from his horse and died at Howth. Keating says he was succeeded by his son Feradach Finnfechtnach, the Annals of the Four Masters by Cairbre Cinnchait.

The Lebor Gabála places him in the reign of the Roman emperor Vespasian (AD 69–79). The chronology of Keating's Foras Feasa ar Éirinn dates his reign to 12 BC – AD 5, that of the Annals of the Four Masters to 8 BC – AD 9.

Preceded by Conchobar Abradruad	High King of Ireland; FFE 12 BC – AD 5 AFM 8 BC – AD 9	Succeeded by Cairbre Cinnchait or Feradach Finnfechtnach
