= Áed Rúad, Díthorba, and Cimbáeth =

Áed Rúad, son of Badarn, Díthorba, son of Deman, and Cimbáeth, son of Fintan, three grandsons of Airgetmar, were, according to medieval Irish legend and historical tradition, High Kings of Ireland who ruled in rotation, seven years at a time. They each ruled for three seven-year stints. Áed died at the end of his third stint, by drowning in a waterfall which was named Eas Ruaid, "the red's waterfall" (Assaroe Falls, Ballyshannon, County Donegal), after him; previously the waterfall had been called Ess Duinn, the "Rapid of Donn", and his death is described as a miracle of sea and mighty wind. Díthorba and Cimbáeth then took their turn, after which Áed's daughter, Macha Mong Ruad, demanded to rule in her father's place. Díthorba and Cimbáeth refused, and battle ensued. Díthorba was killed. Macha forced Díthorba's sons to build her a palace at Emain Macha. She married Cimbáeth and the pair ruled for a further seven years, at the end of which Cimbáeth died of plague, and Macha became the only queen in the List of High Kings of Ireland.

The sources differ as to how the rotation worked. The reigns of Aéd and Díthorba are missing in the Lebor Gabála Érenn – after the previous High King, Lugaid Laigdech, is killed by Áed, a dinsenchas story about the founding of Emain Macha is interpolated, followed by the reign of Cimbáeth, who is said to have succeeded Díthorba and ruled for twenty-eight years. The dinsenchas story tells how each of the three cousins ruled for seven years in turn, and each ruled three seven-year stints; the Annals of the Four Masters agrees, but Geoffrey Keating gives them each a single reign of twenty-one years each, except for Cimbáeth, who rules for twenty. The Lebor Gabála synchronises Cimbáeth's reign to that of Alexander the Great (336–323 BC). The chronology of Keating's Foras Feasa ar Éirinn dates their combined reigns to 530–469 BC, the Annals of the Four Masters to 731–661 BC.

Royal titles
Preceded by Lugaid Laigdech	High Kings of Ireland (in rotation); LGE 4th century BC; FFE 530–468 BC; AFM 731–661 BC	Succeeded by Macha Mong Ruad
