= Elim mac Conrach =

Legendary high king of Ireland

Elim, son of Conrai, was, according to medieval Irish legend and historical tradition, a High King of Ireland.

The Lebor Gabála Érenn says he overthrew the previous High King Fíachu Finnolach in an uprising of aithech-tuatha or "subject peoples". The nobility of Ireland were massacred, with only three pregnant women escaping: Fíachu's wife Eithne Imgel, daughter of the king of Alba; Gruibne, daughter of the king of Britain and wife of the king of Munster; and Aine, daughter of the king of the Saxons, and wife of the king of Ulster. Gruibe was the mother of Corb Olom, ancestor of the Eóganachta of Munster; Aine's son Tibraide Tírech was the ancestor of the Dál nAraidi of Ulster; Eithne fled to Alba where she gave birth to Fíachu's son Tuathal Techtmar. Elim ruled for twenty years, at the end of which Tuathal landed at Inber Domnainn and was proclaimed king. He then marched on Tara and defeated and killed Elim in battle on the nearby hill of Achall.

The Annals of the Four Masters broadly agree with the Lebor Gabála, adding only that the revolt of the aithech-tuatha was led by the provincial kings, Elim being the king of Ulster, and that during his reign Ireland was without corn, fruit, milk or fish, as God punished the aithech-tuatha for their evil. Geoffrey Keating tells a slightly different story, ascribing the revolt to Cairbre Cinnchait, with Elim as his successor.

The Lebor Gabála synchronises Elim's reign with that of the Roman emperor Hadrian (AD 117–138). The chronology of Keating's Foras Feasa ar Éirinn dates his reign to AD 60–80, that of the Annals of the Four Masters to AD 56–76.

Preceded by LGE/AFM Fíachu Finnolach; FFE Cairbre Cinnchait	High King of Ireland; LGE 2nd century AD; FFE AD 60–80; AFM AD 56–76	Succeeded by Tuathal Techtmar
