= Slánoll =

Irish king

Slánoll, son of Ollom Fotla, was, according to medieval Irish legend and historical tradition, a High King of Ireland. He succeeded to the throne on the death of his brother Fínnachta. It is said that there was no disease during his reign (his name is explained as Old Irish slán, meaning "whole, healthy" and oll, meaning "great, ample"). After a reign of fifteen, seventeen, or thirty years, he was found dead of unknown causes in his bed in Tara and was succeeded by his brother Géde Ollgothach. When his body was dug up forty years later by his son Ailill, it showed no sign of decomposition. The chronology of Geoffrey Keating's Foras Feasa ar Éirinn dates his reign to 895–880 BC, while the Annals of the Four Masters places it between 1257 and 1241 BC.

Preceded by Fínnachta	High King of Ireland; AFM 1257–1241 BC; FFE 895–880 BC	Succeeded by Géde Ollgothach
