= Clothru =

Daughter of a High King of Ireland

Clothru was, according to medieval Irish legend, the daughter of Eochu Feidlech, a High King of Ireland, and the sister of queen Medb of Connacht and Ethniu. When her triplet brothers, the findemna, were fighting with their father Eochu Feidlech for the high kingship, she was concerned that her brothers might die without heirs. She is said to have seduced the three of them, and conceived Lugaid Riab nDerg. The next day, according to legend, her brothers were indeed killed, and when Lugaid was born, he was their heir. His epithet Riab nDerg ("the red-striped") came from two red stripes around his neck and waist, dividing him into three: above the neck he resembled Nár; from the neck to the waist he resembled Bres; and from the waist down he resembled Lothar. Lugaid later also became a High King of Ireland, thus Clothru's incest preserved the line of succession. Incest features further in Clothru's story: she is said to have then slept with Lugaid herself, conceiving Crimthann Nia Náir, who later also became a High King of Ireland. She was thus Crimthann's mother, aunt and grandmother.

The island of Inchcleraun (Irish Inis Cloithrinn) in County Longford takes its name from her.
