= Sétna Airt =

Sétna Airt, son of Artrí, son of Éber, son of Ír, son of Míl Espáine, was, according to medieval Irish legend and historical tradition, a High King of Ireland. He came to power after the death of the previous incumbent, Rothechtaid mac Main, whom, according to one version of the story, he had killed in single combat at Cruachan, fighting to protect his son, Fíachu Fínscothach. He ruled for five years, until Fíachu, returning from exile, killed him at Cruachan. Geoffrey Keating adds that Fíachu returned to Cruachan in a "black fleet", and the Annals of the Four Masters says he was assisted in the killing of Sétna by the future High King Muinemón. The chronology of Keating's Foras Feasa ar Éirinn dates his reign to 980–975 BC, that of the Annals of the Four Masters to 1358–1353 BC.

Royal titles
Preceded by Rothechtaid mac Main	High King of Ireland; AFM 1358–1353 BC; FFE 980–975 BC	Succeeded by Fíachu Fínscothach
