= Moorstown Castle =

Tower house and bawn in County Tipperary, Ireland

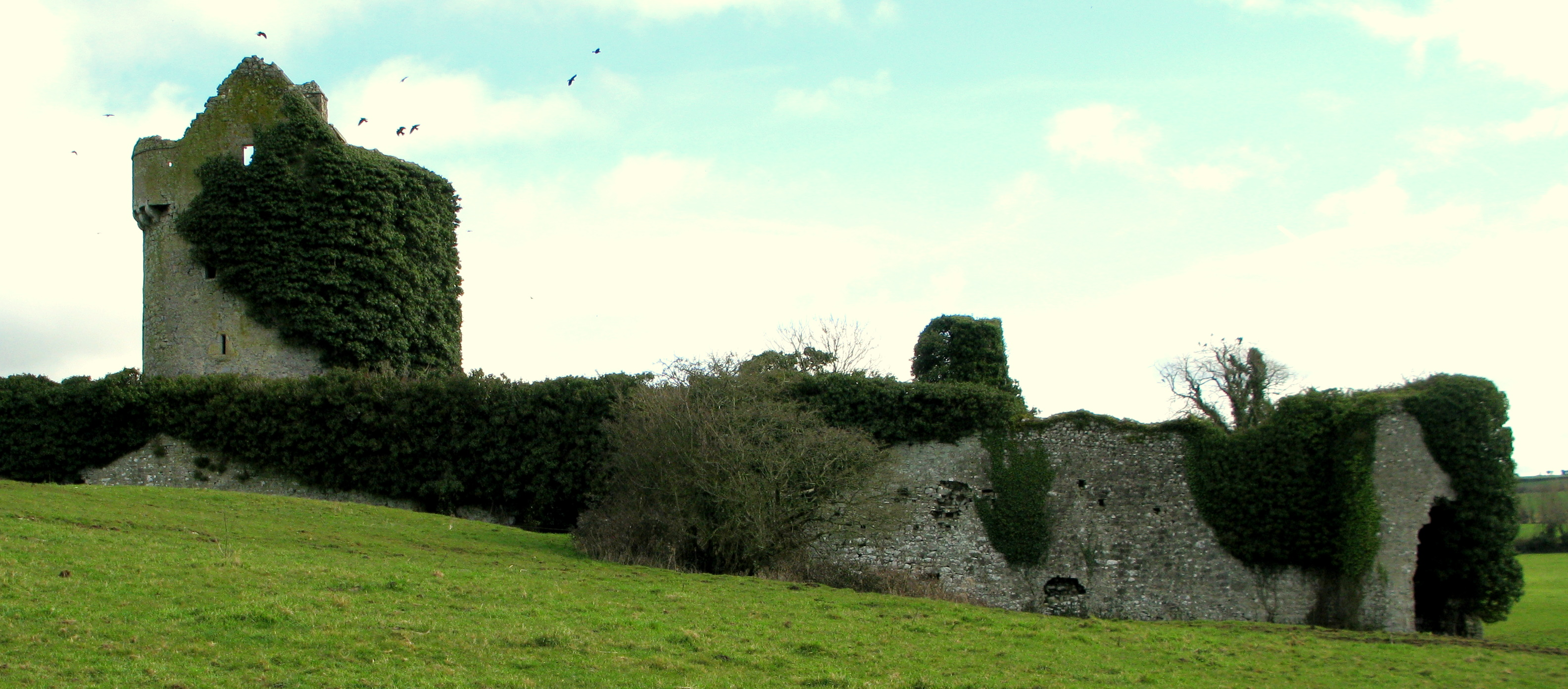
- Moorstown Castle, 2011.

- Location within Ireland
- 52°23′20″N 7°49′50″W
- Location: 6 miles (10 km) west of Clonmel, County Tipperary, Ireland

History
- Built: 15th century

Moorstown Castle is a late 15th-century stone structure consisting of an enclosed circular keep near Clonmel, County Tipperary, Ireland.

== Location ==
The tower house complex is located on a small road off the modern road from Clonmel to Cahir; while visible from the main road, it is on private land. It stands on a grassed limestone hillock.

== History ==
Moorstown Castle was built by James Keating, an ally of the Earl of Ormond. The castle and associated lands passed, under a mortgage agreement, to Robert Cox of Bruff in 1635, and then by marriage to the Greene family. It was bought by Richard Grubb through the Landed Estates Court in 1855. As of 2011, the property remained in private ownership.

It is thought that the 17th-century Catholic priest, poet and historian Geoffrey Keating (Seathrún Céitinn) had family connections with the castle; evidence suggests that he may have been the third son of James FitzEdmund Keating of Moorstown.

== Structure ==
Moorstown consists of a circular tower house or keep, and a protective walled courtyard or bawn; the bawn was probably built first and the tower house added later. The bawn, built with limestone facing inside and outside, and a rubble core, has two defensive towers, to the southwest and northeast, and a fortified gatehouse with residential space for guards. The four-storey circular tower house found at Moorstown is unusual in Irish architecture, most Irish tower houses being square, but the form is found at several locations in County Tipperary. There is a spiral staircase, and the main living space was on the second floor. The second floor has one larger window; otherwise most of the windows of the building are small. The third floor is believed to have been used to accommodate doves. There are musket loops for defence in multiple locations, and the building has parapets but no battlements.

== Popular culture ==
Moorstown Castle was one of the Tipperary locations used in Stanley Kubrick's 1975 epic film Barry Lyndon.
