= Findemna =

Three Irish mythical figures

In Irish mythology the three Findemna or Finn Eamna (variously interpreted as "fair triplets" or "three fair ones of Emain Macha") were three sons of the High King of Ireland, Eochaid Feidlech. Their names were Bres, Nár and Lothar.

They conspired to overthrow their father. The day before meeting him in battle they were visited by their sister, Clothru, who tried in vain to dissuade them from this course of action. They were childless, so for fear that they might die without an heir, Clothru took all three of them to bed, conceiving Lugaid Riab nDerg, son of the three Findemna. Lugaid later became High King of Ireland, so Clothru's incest preserved the line of succession to the high kingship.
