= Bresal Bó-Díbad =

Bresal Bó-Díbad, son of Rudraige, was, according to medieval Irish legend and historical tradition, a High King of Ireland. He took power after killing his predecessor, Finnat Már, and ruled for eleven years, during which there was a plague on cattle (Old Irish bó díbad, "extinction of cows") which left only one bull and one heifer alive.

A story about the passage tomb of Dowth (Dubhadh), in the Dindsenchas (lore of places), says that Bresal compelled the men of Ireland to build a tower to heaven within a day. His sister cast a spell, making the sun stand still so that one day lasted indefinitely. However, Bresal committed incest with his sister, which broke the spell. The sun set and the builders left, hence the name Dubhadh ('darkening'). This tale has been linked with solstice alignments at Brú na Bóinne. It has also been linked with recent DNA analysis, which found that a man buried at nearby Newgrange had parents who were most likely siblings. This could mean that knowledge of the event survived for thousands of years before being recorded as a myth in the Middle Ages.

He was killed by Finnat's son Lugaid Luaigne. The Lebor Gabála Érenn synchronises his reign with that of Ptolemy X Alexander I (110–88 BC) in Egypt. The chronology of Geoffrey Keating's Foras Feasa ar Éirinn dates his reign to 151–140 BC, that of the Annals of the Four Masters to 210–199 BC.

Preceded by Finnat Már	High King of Ireland; LGE 2nd–1st century BC; FFE 151–140 BC; AFM 210–199 BC	Succeeded by Lugaid Luaigne
