= Fiach =

Fiach is an Irish male given name. It may refer to:

- Saint Fiacc, fifth-century bishop of Sletty in Ireland
- Fiach McHugh O'Byrne (1534–1597) Irish chief
- Fiach Mac Conghail (born 1964) Irish theatre director and Senator
- Fiach Moriarty, Irish singer-songwriter

== See also ==
- Tomás Ó Fiaich, Irish Catholic primate and cardinal

== Similar names ==
- Fiacha
- Fiachra
- Fiachna
