= Demal mac Rothechtaid =

Son of Rothechtaid mac Main

Demal mac Rothechtaid was the son of Rothechtaid mac Main who, according to medieval legend and tradition, was a High King of Ireland.

He was the father of Dian mac Demal and grandfather of the High King Sírna Sáeglach.
