= Dui Ladrach =

Dui Ladrach, son of Fíachu Tolgrach, was, according to medieval Irish legend and historical tradition, a High King of Ireland. He helped his father kill the High King Art mac Lugdach, then helped Airgetmar take the throne by killing Art's son Ailill Finn and grandson Eochu mac Ailella. Finally he and Eochu Fíadmuine's son Lugaid Laigdech killed Airgetmar, and Dui took the throne himself, ruling for ten years until his former accomplice Lugaid killed him. The Lebor Gabála synchronises his reign with that of Artaxerxes III of Persia (358–338 BC). The chronology of Geoffrey Keating's Foras Feasa ar Éirinn dates his reign to 547–537 BC, that of the Annals of the Four Masters to 748–738 BC. His son was Eochu Buadach, who was the father of High King Ugaine Mor Mac Eochach.

Preceded by Airgetmar	High King of Ireland; LGE 4th century BC; FFE 547–537 BC; AFM 748–738 BC	Succeeded by Lugaid Laigdech
