= Mal mac Rochride =

Legendary high king of Ireland

Mal, son of Rochraide, a descendant of the legendary hero Conall Cernach, was, according to medieval Irish legend and historical tradition, a king of the Ulaid and later a High King of Ireland. He took the High Kingship after he killed Tuathal Techtmar at Mag Line (Moylinny near Larne, County Antrim), and ruled for four years, at the end of which he was killed by Tuathal's son Fedlimid Rechtmar. The Lebor Gabála Érenn synchronises his reign with that of the Roman emperor Antoninus Pius (138–161). The chronology of Geoffrey Keating's Foras Feasa ar Éirinn dates his reign to 100–104, that of the Annals of the Four Masters to 106–110. His son was Tipraiti Tireach.

== See also ==
- Matholwch

Preceded by Tuathal Techtmar	High King of Ireland; LGE 2nd century AD; FFE AD 100–104; AFM AD 106–110	Succeeded by Fedlimid Rechtmar
