= List of High Kings of Ireland =

High Kingship of Ireland
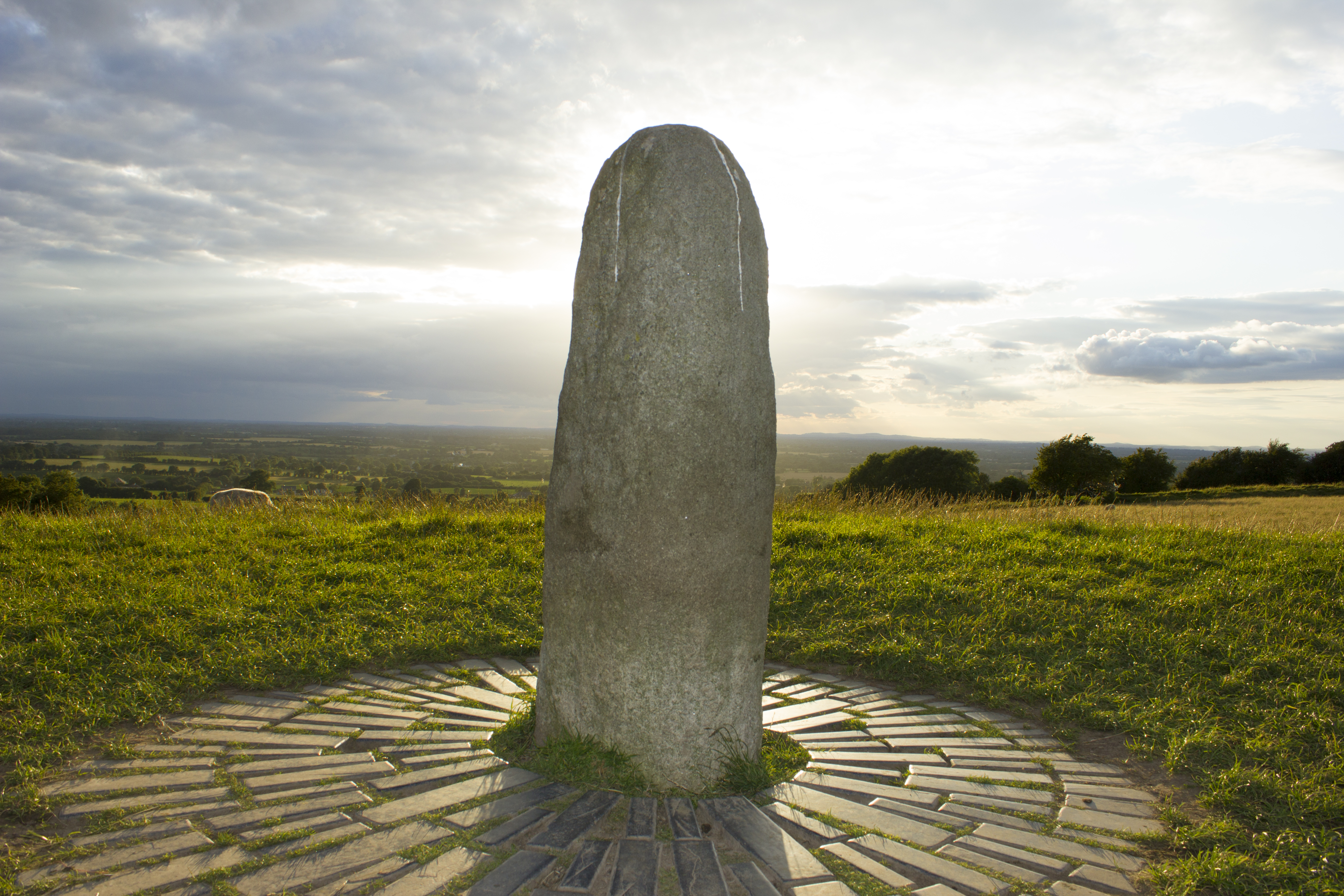
- The Lia Fáil (Stone of Destiny) and symbol of sovereignty on the Hill of Tara.

Details
- Style: Ard-Rí na hÉireann; Rí Érenn Uile
- First monarch: Sláine mac Dela (mythical); Máel Sechnaill I (historical)
- Last monarch: Ruaidrí Ua Conchobair (legitimate); Brian O'Neill (first revival); Edward Bruce (second revival)
- Formed: 1934 BC (by tradition)
- Abolished: 1198; 828 years ago AD
- Residence: Hill of Tara
- Pretender: Brian Ua Néill/Edubard a Briuis (claimant)

Medieval Irish historical tradition held that Ireland had a High King (Ard Rí) based at Tara since ancient times, and compilations like the 11th-century Lebor Gabála Érenn, followed by Early Modern works like the Annals of the Four Masters and Foras Feasa ar Éirinn, purported to trace the line of High Kings. John T. Koch explains: "Although the kingship of Tara was a special kingship whose occupants had aspirations towards supremacy among the kings of Ireland, in political terms it is unlikely that any king had sufficient authority to dominate the whole island before the 9th century". Máel Sechnaill I is often considered the first historical High King, although he faced some opposition. Applying the title to earlier kings is considered anachronistic, while kings from before the 5th century are generally considered legendary. The traditional list of High Kings is thus a mixture of historical facts and legend.

The annals describe some later High Kings as rígh Érenn co fressabra ("Kings of Ireland with opposition"), which is a reference to the instability of the kingship of Tara from the death of Máel Sechnaill mac Domnaill in 1022. He had been overthrown by Brian Boru in 1002, and restored in 1014 following Brian's death, but Brian's example was followed by many other dynasties in the century following 1022. The High Kingship was effectively ended in the 1170s after the Anglo-Norman invasion, its last holder being Ruaidrí Ua Conchobair.

== Legendary kings ==
=== Kings in the Baile Chuind ===
The earliest-surviving list appears in the Baile Chuind (The Ecstasy of Conn), a late-7th-century poem in which Conn of the Hundred Battles experiences a vision of the kings who will succeed him. Many of these kings appear to correspond with the kings of later traditions, although the order is different, and some of the kings cannot be identified. The last four kings following Snechta Fína (Fínsnechta Fledach) do not correspond with any of the kings in later lists. The poem is therefore presumed to have been written during his time, and the kings who follow him are presumed to be fictional.

With few exceptions, kings belong to Dál Cuinn (the Connachta and Uí Néill). Understood as a list of kings of Tara, it is not considered to be inclusive. A number of well-known kings from the Laigin, Érainn, Ulaid and Cruthin, are missing. The chief rivals of Dál Cuinn after Conn's floruit (and others for a few centuries before) were the Dáirine (usually the Corcu Loígde during Dál Cuinn's era), two or three of whom are listed, but whose overkingdom in the south of Ireland collapsed in the 6th century. They were outmanoeuvred and replaced by the related Eóganachta, who established the Kingship of Cashel, soon to periodically rival Tara. The poem itself in its closing language probably mentions Cathal mac Finguine when young, and this can also be used to date the Baile Chuind to the late 7th or early 8th century.

Name	Presumed identity	Notes
Not named	Conn Cétchathach	The list recounts Conn's vision of the kings who will follow him
Art	Art mac Cuinn	Dál Cuinn
Mac Con moccu Lugde Loígde	Lugaid Mac Con	Dáirine
Corbmac	Cormac mac Airt	Dál Cuinn
Corpre	Cairbre Lifechair	Dál Cuinn
Fiechri	Fiachrae Cássan	Cruthin and/or Airgialla?
Dáire Drechlethan	likely Dáire Doimthech	Dáirine
Fécho	Fíacha Sroiptine?	Dál Cuinn
Muiredach Tirech	Muiredach Tírech	Dál Cuinn
Crimthand	Crimthann mac Fidaig	Eóganachta/Dáirine
Níell	Niall Noígíallach	Dál Cuinn
Loígaire	Lóegaire mac Néill	Dál Cuinn/Uí Néill
Corpri	Coirpre mac Néill (died c. 463)	Dál Cuinn/Uí Néill
Ailill	Ailill Molt (died 482)	Connachta/Uí Fiachrach
Lugid	Lugaid mac Lóegairi (died c. 507)	Uí Néill
Mac Ercéni	Muirchertach mac Ercae (died c. 536)	Uí Néill/Cenél nEógain
Óengarb	Túathal Máelgarb (died c. 544)	Uí Néill
Aíd	probably Áed mac Ainmuirech (died 598)	Uí Néill/Cenél Conaill; seemingly misplaced, chronologically
Aíd Olláin	probably Áed Uaridnach (died 612)	Uí Néill/Cenél nEógain; seemingly misplaced, chronologically
Diermait	Diarmait mac Cerbaill (died c. 565)	Uí Néill? Origins obscure.
Feáchno	Fiachnae mac Báetáin (died 626) or, perhaps, Fiachnae mac Feradaig, father of Suibne Menn	Cruthin/Dál nAraidi, or Uí Néill/Cenél nEógain
Suibne	Suibne Menn (died 628)	Uí Néill/Cenél nEógain
Domnall	Domnall mac Áedo (died c. 642)	Uí Néill/Cenél Conaill
Blathmac and Diarmaid grandson of the other one	Blathmac mac Áedo Sláine and Diarmait mac Áedo Sláine (both died 665)	Southern Uí Néill
Snechta Fína	Fínsnechta Fledach (died c. 695)	Uí Néill/Síl nÁedo Sláine
(Cathal mac Finguine)	(died 742)	Eóganachta/Eóganacht Glendamnach

=== Synthetic lists ===
The Lebor Gabála Érenn, dating to the 11th–12th century, purports to list every High King from remote antiquity to the time of Henry II's Lordship of Ireland in 1171. The High Kingship is established by the Fir Bolg, and their nine kings are succeeded by a sequence of nine kings of the Tuatha Dé Danann, most if not all of whom are considered euhemerised deities. After the Milesian (Gaelic) conquest the High Kingship is contested for centuries between the descendants of Eber Finn and Érimón, sons of Míl Espáine. The original compilation stopped at the reign of Tuathal Techtmar. The kings of the Goidelic dynasties established by Tuathal were added by other editors. Later editions of the Lebor Gabála tried to synchronise its chronology with dateable kings of: Assyria, Persia and Ptolemaic Egypt and Roman emperors.

There are a handful of sources slightly predating the Lebor Gabála Érenn covering significant portions of essentially the same list of Milesian High Kings (though following a discrepant chronology), starting with the Laud Synchronisms estimated to have been compiled c. 1021 (part of Laud 610). The oldest section of the Lebor Gabála Érenn "Roll of Kings" is taken from the poems of Gilla Cómáin mac Gilla Samthainde, written c. 1072.

Early Modern works like the Annals of the Four Masters and Geoffrey Keating's Foras Feasa ar Éirinn continued this tradition based on later Irish annals. Keating's chronology, based on reign lengths, is longer than the synchronised chronology of the Lebor Gabála, and the Four Masters' chronology is even longer.

- LGE: synchronised dates from Lebor Gabála Érenn
- FFE: chronology based on reign lengths given in Geoffrey Keating's Forus Feasa ar Erinn.
- AFM: chronology from the Annals of the Four Masters

==== Fir Bolg High Kings ====
These kings are considered to be legendary.

	LGE	FFE	AFM
Sláine mac Dela		1514–1513 BC	1934–1933 BC
Rudraige mac Dela		1513–1511 BC	1933–1931 BC
Gann and Genann mac Dela		1511–1507 BC	1931–1927 BC
Sengann mac Dela		1507–1502 BC	1927–1922 BC
Fiacha Cennfinnán mac Starn		1502–1497 BC	1922–1917 BC
Rinnal mac Genann		1497–1491 BC	1917–1911 BC
Fodbgen mac Sengann		1491–1487 BC	1911–1907 BC
Eochaid mac Eirc		1487–1477 BC	1907–1897 BC

==== Tuatha Dé Danann High Kings ====
These kings are considered to be legendary.

	LGE	FFE	AFM
Bres		1477–1470 BC	1897–1890 BC
Nuada		1470–1447 BC	1890–1870 BC
Lugh		1447–1407 BC	1870–1830 BC
Eochaid Ollathair (The Dagda)		1407–1337 BC	1830–1750 BC
Delbáeth		1337–1327 BC	1750–1740 BC
Fiacha		1327–1317 BC	1740–1730 BC
Mac Cuill, Mac Cecht and Mac Gréine		1317–1287 BC	1730–1700 BC

==== Milesian High Kings ====
These kings are considered to be legendary.

	LGE	FFE	AFM
Eber Finn and Érimón		1287–1286 BC	1700 BC
Érimón		1286–1272 BC	1700–1684 BC
Muimne, Luigne and Laigne		1272–1269 BC	1684–1681 BC
Ér, Orba, Ferón and Fergna		1269 BC	1681 BC
Íriel Fáid		1269–1259 BC	1681–1671 BC
Ethriel		1259–1239 BC	1671–1651 BC
Conmáel		1239–1209 BC	1651–1621 BC
Tigernmas		1209–1159 BC	1621–1544 BC
			Interregnum 1544–1537 BC
Eochaid Étgudach		1159–1155 BC	1537–1533 BC
Cermna Finn and Sobairce		1155–1115 BC	1533–1493 BC
Eochaid Faebar Glas		1115–1095 BC	1493–1473 BC
Fíachu Labrainne		1095–1071 BC	1473–1449 BC
Eochu Mumu		1071–1050 BC	1449–1428 BC
Óengus Olmucaid		1050–1032 BC	1428–1410 BC
Énna Airgdech		1032–1005 BC	1410–1383 BC
Rothechtaid mac Main		1005–980 BC	1383–1358 BC
Sétna Airt		980–975 BC	1358–1353 BC
Fíachu Fínscothach		975–955 BC	1353–1333 BC
Muinemón		955–950 BC	1333–1328 BC
Faildergdóit		950–943 BC	1328–1318 BC
Ollom Fotla		943–913 BC	1318–1278 BC
Fínnachta		913–895 BC	1278–1258 BC
Slánoll		895–880 BC	1257–1241 BC
Géde Ollgothach		880–863 BC	1241–1231 BC
Fíachu Findoilches		863–833 BC	1231–1209 BC
Berngal	7th century BC	833–831 BC	1209–1197 BC
Ailill mac Slánuill	7th century BC	831–815 BC	1197–1181 BC
Sírna Sáeglach	7th century BC	814–794 BC	1181–1031 BC
Rothechtaid Rotha	7th century BC	794–787 BC	1031–1024 BC
Elim Olfínechta	7th century BC	787–786 BC	1024–1023 BC
Gíallchad	7th century BC	786–777 BC	1023–1014 BC
Art Imlech	7th–6th century BC	777–755 BC	1014–1002 BC
Nuadu Finn Fáil	7th–6th century BC	755–735 BC	1002–962 BC
Bres Rí	7th–6th century BC	735–726 BC	962–953 BC
Eochu Apthach	6th–5th century BC	726–725 BC	953–952 BC
Finn mac Blatha	6th–5th century BC	725–705 BC	952–930 BC
Sétna Innarraid	5th century BC	705–685 BC	930–910 BC
Siomón Brecc	5th century BC	685–679 BC	910–904 BC
Dui Finn	5th century BC	679–674 BC	904–894 BC
Muiredach Bolgrach	5th century BC	674–670 BC	894–893 BC
Énna Derg	5th century BC	670–658 BC	893–881 BC
Lugaid Íardonn	5th century BC	658–649 BC	881–872 BC
Sírlám	5th century BC	649–633 BC	872–856 BC
Eochu Uairches	5th century BC	633–621 BC	856–844 BC
Eochu Fíadmuine and Conaing Bececlach	5th century BC	621–616 BC	844–839 BC
Lugaid Lámderg and Conaing Bececlach	5th century BC	616–609 BC	839–832 BC
Conaing Bececlach (alone)	5th century BC	609–599 BC	832–812 BC
Art mac Lugdach	5th century BC	599–593 BC	812–806 BC
Fíachu Tolgrach		593–586 BC	806–796 BC
Ailill Finn	5th–4th century BC	586–577 BC	796–785 BC
Eochu mac Ailella	5th–4th century BC	577–570 BC	785–778 BC
Airgetmar	4th century BC	570–547 BC	778–748 BC
Dui Ladrach	4th century BC	547–537 BC	748–738 BC
Lugaid Laigdech	4th century BC	537–530 BC	738–731 BC
Áed Rúad	4th century BC	530–509 BC	731–724 BC
Díthorba	4th century BC	509–488 BC	724–717 BC
Cimbáeth	4th century BC	488–468 BC	717–710 BC
Áed Rúad (2nd time)			710–703 BC
Díthorba (2nd time)			703–696 BC
Cimbáeth (2nd time)			696–689 BC
Áed Rúad (3rd time)			689–682 BC
Díthorba (3rd time)			682–675 BC
Cimbáeth (3rd time)			675–668 BC
Cimbáeth and queen Macha			668–661 BC
Macha Mong Ruad (alone)	4th–3rd century BC	468–461 BC	661–654 BC
Rechtaid Rígderg	4th–3rd century BC	461–441 BC	654–634 BC
Úgaine Mor	3rd century BC	441–411 BC	634–594 BC
Lóegaire Lorc	3rd century BC	411–409 BC	594–592 BC
Cobthach Cóel Breg	3rd century BC	409–379 BC	592–542 BC
Labraid Loingsech	3rd century BC	379–369 BC	542–523 BC
Meilge Molbthach	3rd century BC	369–362 BC	523–506 BC
Mug Corb	3rd century BC	362–355 BC	506–499 BC
Óengus Ollom	3rd century BC	355–337 BC	499–481 BC
Irereo	3rd century BC	337–330 BC	481–474 BC
Fer Corb	3rd century BC	330–319 BC	474–463 BC
Connla Cáem	3rd century BC	319–315 BC	463–443 BC
Ailill Caisfiaclach	3rd–2nd century BC	315–290 BC	443–418 BC
Adamair	3rd–2nd century BC	290–285 BC	418–414 BC
Eochaid Ailtlethan	3rd–2nd century BC	285–274 BC	414–396 BC
Fergus Fortamail	2nd century BC	274–262 BC	396–385 BC
Óengus Tuirmech Temrach	2nd century BC	262–232 BC	385–326 BC
Conall Collamrach	2nd century BC	232–226 BC	326–320 BC
Nia Segamain	2nd century BC	226–219 BC	320–313 BC
Énna Aignech	2nd century BC	219–191 BC	313–293 BC
Crimthann Coscrach	2nd century BC	191–184 BC	293–289 BC
Rudraige mac Sithrigi	2nd–1st century BC	184–154 BC	289–219 BC
Finnat Már	2nd–1st century BC	154–151 BC	219–210 BC
Bresal Bó-Díbad	2nd–1st century BC	151–140 BC	210–199 BC
Lugaid Luaigne	2nd–1st century BC	140–135 BC	199–184 BC
Congal Cláiringnech	1st century BC	135–120 BC	184–169 BC
Dui Dallta Dedad	1st century BC	120–110 BC	169–159 BC
Fachtna Fáthach	1st century BC	110–94 BC	159–143 BC
Eochu Feidlech	1st century BC	94–82 BC	143–131 BC
Eochu Airem	1st century BC	82–70 BC	131–116 BC
Eterscél	1st century BC–1st century AD	70–64 BC	116–111 BC
Nuadu Necht	1st century	64–63 BC	111–110 BC
Conaire Mór	1st century	63–33 BC	110–40 BC
	interregnum (5 years)		interregnum 40–33 BC
Lugaid Riab nDerg	1st century	33–13 BC	33–9 BC
Conchobar Abradruad	1st century	13–12 BC	9–8 BC
	Cairbre Cinnchait 1st century	Crimthann Nia Náir 12 BC – AD 5	Crimthann Nia Náir; 8 BC – AD 9
	Feradach Finnfechtnach 1st century	Feradach Finnfechtnach; AD 5–25	Cairbre Cinnchait; AD 9–14
	Fíatach Finn, 1st century	Fiatach Finn 25–28	Feradach Finnfechtnach 14–36
	Fíachu Finnolach 1st century	Fiacha Finnfolaidh; 28–55	Fiatach Finn 36–39
	Elim mac Conrach, 2nd century	Cairbre Cinnchait; 55–60	Fiacha Finnfolaidh; 39–56
		Elim mac Conrach; 60–80	Elim mac Conrach; 56–76

==== Goidelic High Kings ====
Many of these kings are considered to be legendary. Dynastic affiliations are based on the genealogies of historical dynasties who claimed them as an ancestor.

	LGE	FFE	AFM	Dynasty – Sept
Tuathal Techtmar	2nd century	80–100	76–106	Connachta (ancestor)
Mal mac Rochride	2nd century	100–104	106–110	Ulaid
Fedlimid Rechtmar	2nd century	104–113	110–119	Connachta (ancestor)
Cathair Mór	2nd century	113–116	119–122	Laigin
Conn Cétchathach	2nd century	116–136	122–157	Connachta (ancestor)
Conaire Cóem	2nd century	136–143	157–165	Clanna Dedad – Síl Conairi (ancestor)
Art mac Cuinn	2nd century	143–173	165–195	Connachta
Lugaid mac Con		173–203	195–225	Dáirine – Corcu Loígde
Fergus Dubdétach		203–204	225–226	Ulaid
Cormac mac Airt		204–244	226–266	Connachta
Eochaid Gonnat		244–245	266–267	Ulaid?
Cairbre Lifechair		245–272	267–284	Connachta
Fothad Cairpthech and Fothad Airgthech		272–273	284–285	Dáirine – Corcu Loígde
Fíacha Sroiptine		273–306	285–322	Connachta
Colla Uais		306–310	322–326	Connachta
Muiredach Tirech		310–343	326–356	Connachta
Cáelbad		343–344	356–357	Ulaid?
Eochaid Mugmedon		344–351	357–365	Connachta
Crimthann mac Fidaig		351–368	365–376	Érainn?
Niall Noígíallach (generally thought historical)		368–395	376–405	Connachta – Uí Néill (ancestor)
Nath Í (probably did not reign at Tara)		395–418	405–428	Connachta – Uí Fiachrach
Lóegaire mac Néill (historical)		418–448	428–458	Connachta – Uí Néill

== Semi-historical High Kings of Ireland ==
These kings are historical figures for the most part, but naming them High Kings of Ireland may be anachronistic or inaccurate in certain cases. Their dynastic affiliations are also uncertain, as some may have been posthumously added to groups they did not belong to.

Kings of Ireland	459–831	Dynasty – Sept
Ailill Molt	459–478	Connachta – Uí Fiachrach
Lugaid mac Lóegairi	479–503	Uí Néill – Cenél Lóegairi
Muirchertach mac Ercae	504–527	Uí Néill – Cenél nEógain
Túathal Máelgarb	528–538	Uí Néill – Cenél Coirpri
Diarmait mac Cerbaill	539–558	Uí Néill – Cenél Conaill
Domhnall and Fearghus	559–561	Uí Néill – Cenél nEógain
Eochaidh and Baedan	562–563	Uí Néill – Cenél nEógain
Ainmuire mac Sétnai	564–566	Uí Néill – Cenél Conaill
Báetán mac Ninnedo	567	Uí Néill – Cenél Conaill
Áed mac Ainmuirech	568–594	Uí Néill – Cenél Conaill
Áed Sláine and Colmán Rímid	595–600	Uí Néill – Cenél Conaill and Cenél nEógain
Áed Uaridnach	601–607	Uí Néill – Cenél nEógain
Máel Coba mac Áedo	608–610	Uí Néill – Cenél Conaill
Suibne Menn	611–623	Uí Néill – Cenél nEógain
Domnall mac Áedo	624–639	Uí Néill – Cenél Conaill
Cellach and Conall	640–656	Uí Néill – Cenél Conaill
Diarmait and Blathmac	657–664	Uí Néill – Síl nÁedo Sláine
Sechnassach	665–669	Uí Néill – Síl nÁedo Sláine
Cenn Fáelad	670–673	Uí Néill – Síl nÁedo Sláine
Fínsnechta Fledach	674–693	Uí Néill – Síl nÁedo Sláine
Loingsech mac Óengusso	694–701	Uí Néill – Cenél Conaill
Congal Cennmagair	702–708	Uí Néill – Cenél Conaill
Fergal mac Máele Dúin	709–718	Uí Néill – Cenél nEógain
Fogartach mac Néill	719	Uí Néill – Síl nÁedo Sláine
Cináed mac Írgalaig	720–722	Uí Néill – Síl nÁedo Sláine
Flaithbertach mac Loingsig	723–729	Uí Néill – Cenél Conaill
Áed Allán	730–738	Uí Néill – Cenél nEógain
Domnall Midi	739–758	Uí Néill – Clann Cholmáin
Niall Frossach	759–765	Uí Néill – Cenél nEógain
Donnchad Midi	766–792	Uí Néill – Clann Cholmáin
Áed Oirdnide	793–819	Uí Néill – Cenél nEógain
Conchobar mac Donnchada	819–833	Uí Néill – Clann Cholmáin
Feidlimid mac Crimthainn (according to the Annals of Inisfallen)	832–846; 836–841	Uí Néill – Cenél nEógain or Eóganachta – Eóganacht Chaisil

== Historical High Kings of Ireland ==
These kings can be considered genuinely historical High Kings (with or without opposition).

Kings of Ireland	832–1198	Dynasty – Sept
Máel Sechnaill mac Máele Ruanaid	846–860	Uí Néill – Clann Cholmáin
Áed Findliath	861–876	Uí Néill – Cenél nEógain
Flann Sinna	877–914	Uí Néill – Clann Cholmáin
Niall Glúndub	915–917	Uí Néill – Cenél nEógain
Donnchad Donn	918–942	Uí Néill – Clann Cholmáin
Congalach Cnogba	943–954	Uí Néill – Síl nÁedo Sláine
Domnall ua Néill	955–978	Uí Néill – Cenél nEógain
Máel Sechnaill mac Domnaill	979–1002	Uí Néill – Clann Cholmáin
Brian Bóruma	1002–1014	Dál gCais
Máel Sechnaill mac Domnaill (restored)	1014–1022	Uí Néill – Clann Cholmáin
Donnchad mac Briain	died 1064 (with opposition)	Dál gCais
Diarmait mac Maíl na mBó	died 1072 (with opposition)	Uí Cheinnselaig
Toirdelbach Ua Briain	died 1086 (with opposition)	Dál gCais – Ua Briain
Domnall Ua Lochlainn	died 1121 (with opposition)	Uí Néill – Cenél nEógain
Muirchertach Ua Briain	died 1119 (with opposition)	Dál gCais – Ua Briain
Toirdelbach Ua Conchobair	1119–1156	Uí Briúin – Ua Conchobair
Muirchertach Mac Lochlainn	1156–1166	Uí Néill – Cenél nEógain
Ruaidrí Ua Conchobair	1166–1198	Uí Briúin – Ua Conchobair

== Later attempts at revival ==
- Brian Ua Néill (d. 1260), as part of the mid-13th-century revolts against Anglo-Norman colonisation of Ireland
- Haakon Haakonsson (d. 1263), offered the title to push back against the Anglo-Normans, but declined
- Edubard a Briuis (d. 1318), as part of the Bruce campaign in Ireland

== See also ==
- List of Irish royal consorts
- List of kings of Ulster
- List of kings of Leinster
- List of kings of Connacht
- List of kings of Munster
- List of kings of Meath
- Lordship of Ireland
- Monarchy of Ireland
