= Lugaid Loígde =

Lugaid Loígde "Lugaid of the Fawn/Calf Goddess", also known as Lugaid mac Dáire, was a legendary King of Tara and High King of Ireland. He is a son of Dáire Doimthech, ancestor of the Dáirine, and gives his epithet to their principal royal sept, the Corcu Loígde. A descendant of Lugaid, with whom he may be to some extent identical, is the famous Mac Con, listed in the Old Irish kinglist Baile Chuinn Chétchathaig as Mac Con macc aui (moccu) Lugde Loígde.

In some later syncretic traditions, as Lugaid Laigde, he is made a son of Eochu mac Ailella, and given a son Rechtaid Rígderg. Another late emanation is Lugaid Luaigne.

Daire Doimthech's five sons, to wit, the five Lugaids. Whence did the additional names come upon them, even Lugaid Láigde, a quo Corco-Láigdi, Lugaid Cal, from whom are the Calraige, Lugaid Core, from whom are the Corcraige, Lugaid Corb from whom are the Dál Mescorb of Leinster, and Lugaid Cose, from whom are the Coscraige of the Dési?

This is why Dáire gave the name of Lugaid to each of his sons. Because it had been foretold to him that a son of his would obtain the sovranty [sic] of Erin and that 'Lugaid' would be his name. Then said Dáire to his druid: "Which of my sons will take the kingdom after me?" The druid replied: "A fawn with a golden lustre upon it will come into the assembly, and the son that shall catch the fawn is he that will take the kingdom after thee".

Thereafter the fawn entered the assembly, and the men of Erin together with Dáire's sons, pursued it till they reached Benn Étair. A magical mist is 'set between them (Dáire's sons) and the (rest of the) men of Erin. Thence on after the fawn went Dáire's sons to Dál Moscorb in Leinster, and Lugaid Láigde caught the fawn, and Lugaid Cosc broke it up (coscrais)—so the name Lugaid Cosc clave to him. Lugaid Láeghḟes cooks it, that is, (makes) a feast (fes) for them of it — so that hence he bore (the name) Lugaid Láegḟes 'fawn-feast'.

Lugaid Orcde went for water, taking with him a pitcher, whence he is called Lugaid Orc.

All that was cooked of the fawn Lugaid Láigde would eat, and all the leavings that he put away, Lugaid Corb would consume them. Whence (the name) Corb clave to him. Corb-the 'polluted' thereby.

Lugaid Cál slept—hence he took his appellation

Thereafter they hunt in the wilderness. A great snow fell upon them, so that it was a labour to hold their weapons. One of them goes to look for a house, and he finds a wonderful house with a great fire therein, and ale, and abundance of food, and silvern dishes, and a bed of white bronze. Inside he discovers a huge old woman, wearing a frontlet (?), and her spears of teeth outside her head, and great, old, foul, faded things upon her. She said to the youth, even Lugaid Corb: "What askest thou?" quoth she. "I seek a bed", he answered. "If thou come and lie with me", quoth she, "thou wouldst have one". "Nay", said the youth. He went back to his brothers and told them that he had not found a house. Each of them went, one after another, into the house, and the same (reply) was got from them. At last went Lugaid Láigde. The hag said the same to him. "I will sleep alone with thee", says Lugaid. The hag entered the bed, and Lugaid followed her. It seemed to him that the radiance of her face was the sun rising in the month of May. A purple, bordered gown she wore, and she had beautifully coloured hair. Her fragrance was likened to an odorous herb-garden. Then he mingled in love with her. "Auspicious is thy journey", quoth she. "I am the sovranty, and the kingship of Erin will be obtained by thee".

Lugaid went to his brothers and brings them to the house; and there they get the freshest of food and the oldest of ale, and self-moving drinking-horns pouring out to them.

She said to one of them: "What hast thou met with?" quoth she. "I met with a fawn (loeg)", he answered, "and I alone devoured it". "Lugaid Láigde ('Fawny') shall be thy name with thy kindred", said she.

Then she asked another of them what he had met with? "A wild boar", he answered, "and I alone devoured it". Lugaid Orcdae ('Piggish') shall be thy name with thy kindred", quoth she.

Then she asked the same thing of another man. "I met with nothing at all", says he; "but I fell asleep". "That is drowsy", quoth she: "Lugaid Cál ('sleep') shall be thy name from that".

She asked the same thing of another. "What the other men threw away", said he, "that I consumed". "Lugaid Corb ('corruption') shall be thy name, for corrupted is what thou hast consumed". From him (descend) the Corbraige.

Again she asked the same thing of another. "A fawn escaped from me", quoth he. "Lugaid Loegh-ḟes, i.e. Lugaid Loeg-ḟás ('fawn-empty') shall be thy name", quoth she.

So thence the additional names clave to the Lugaids. Let one of you sleep with me to-night", quoth she.

"I will sleep with thee", says Lugaid Láigde, "for to me it is a great favour".

So that night Lugaid slept with her. 'Tis then they were seen of his brothers, with a purple garment over the damsel and Lugaid, and golden-yellow hair upon her; and she was the most loveable of women.

"Who art thou, O damsel", say they.

"I am the Lady of Erin", quoth she; "and I shall be wavering from hill to hill; and the kingship of Ireland shall be taken by thee, O Lugaid".

Thus were Dáire's sons on the morrow: on a level, houseless plain—with their hounds asleep, fastened to their spears. Thereafter they fare forth to the Assembly of Teltown, and then they tell their tales and adventures to the men of Erin. After that the men of Erin disperse from the assembly.

Daire dies afterwards, and Conn of the Hundred Battles took the kingship of Erin, and Eogan Táidlech took the kingship of Munster, and Lugaid Láigde took the crown-princedom of Munster, and so forth.

== See also ==
- Lugaid (disambiguation)
- Dáire
- Lugh
- Loathly Lady

Preceded by Dui Ladrach	High King of Ireland; LGE 4th century BC; FFE 537–530 BC; AFM 738–731 BC	Succeeded by Áed Rúad
