= Muinemón =

Muinemón (later spelling Muineamhón), son of Cas Clothach, son of Irárd, son of Rothechtaid, son of Ros, son of Glas, son of Nuadu Declam, son of Eochaid Faebar Glas, was, according to medieval Irish legend and historical tradition, a High King of Ireland. He helped Fíachu Fínscothach to murder his father, Sétna Airt, and become High King, and then, twenty years later, killed Fíachu and became High King himself. He is said to have been the first king in Ireland whose followers wore golden torcs around their necks (his name may derive from Old Irish muin, neck). He ruled for five years, until he died of plague at Aidne in Connacht, and was succeeded by his son Faildergdóit. The chronology of Geoffrey Keating's Foras Feasa ar Éirinn dates his reign to 955–950 BC, that of the Annals of the Four Masters to 1333–1328 BC.

The Macalister translation also says that Muinemón was King of Dairbre. In "Collectanea de rebus hibernicis, Volume 1", Charles Vallencey identifies "Dairbre" as Iveragh, Co. Kerry.

Preceded by Fíachu Fínscothach	High King of Ireland; AFM 1333–1328 BC; FFE 955–950 BC	Succeeded by Faildergdóit
