= Fíatach Finn =

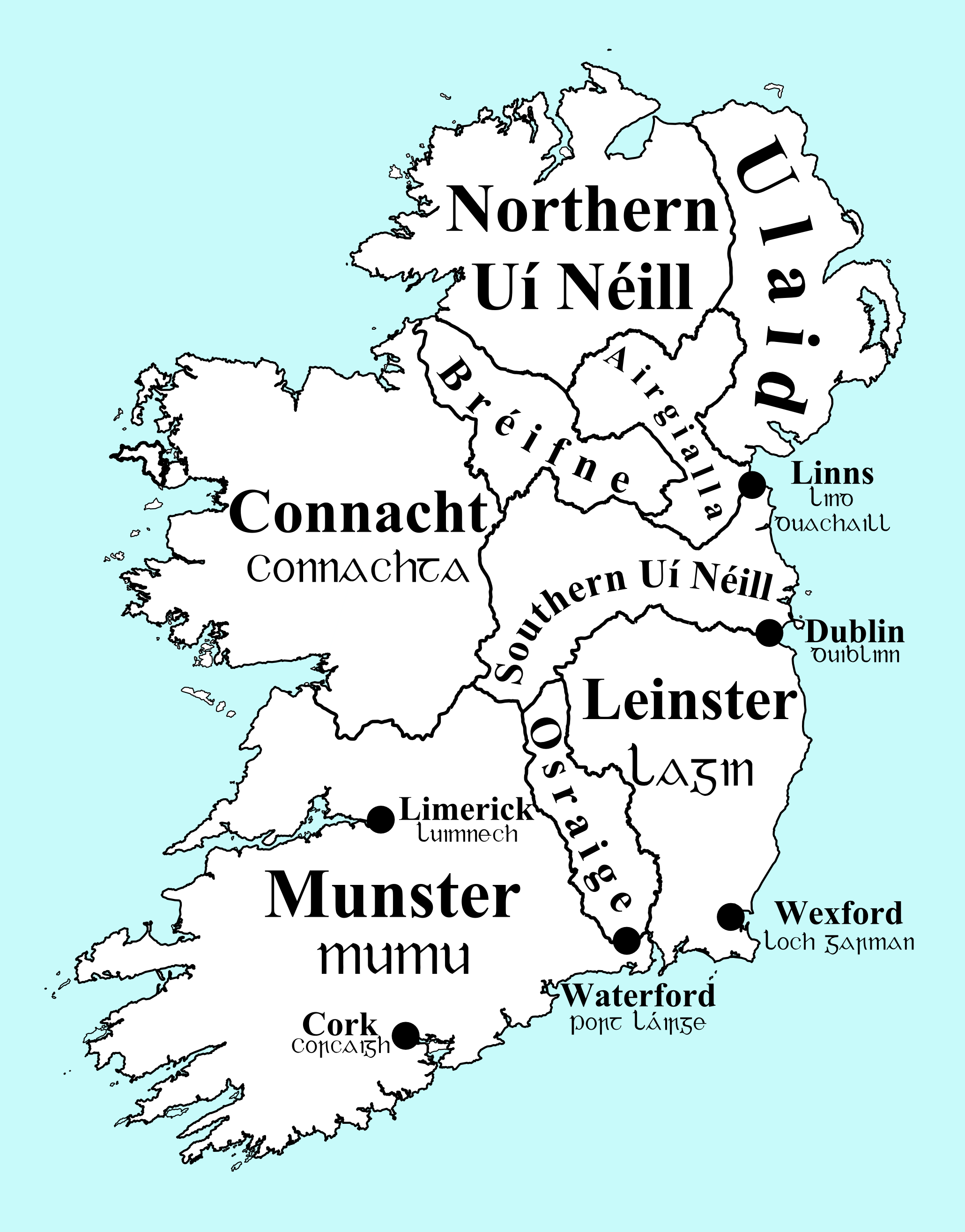
Map of Ireland showing the territory of the Ulaid. Fiatach Finn was a king of the Ulaid and the eponymous ancestor of the Ulaid's ruling dynasty, the Dál Fiatach.

Fiatach Finn mac Dáire, a distant descendant of Óengus Tuirmech Temrach, was, according to medieval Irish legend and historical tradition, a king of the Ulaid, later a High King of Ireland, and the eponymous ancestor of the early Medieval Ulster dynasty of the Dál Fiatach. He was king of the Ulaid while Feradach Finnfechtnach was High King, and succeeded to the High Kingship himself when Feradach died. He ruled for three years until he was killed by Fíachu Finnolach. The Lebor Gabála Érenn synchronises his reign with that of the Roman emperor Nerva (AD 96–98). The chronology of Geoffrey Keating's Foras Feasa ar Éirinn dates his reign to AD 25–28, that of the Annals of the Four Masters to AD 36–39.

Fiatach Finn mac Dáire was also a cousin of the legendary Cú Roí mac Dáire and Conaire Mór of the Érainn and Dáirine (Clanna Dedad). The Dál Fiatach are said to descend from the "Family of Cú Roí" in the Book of Glendalough (Rawlinson B 502).

Preceded by Feradach Finnfechtnach	High King of Ireland; LGE 1st century AD; FFE AD 25–28; AFM AD 36–39	Succeeded by Fíachu Finnolach

== See also ==
- Kings of Ulster
- Darini
- Dál Fiatach
