= Fíachu Findoilches =

Irish king

Fíachu Findoilches, son of Fínnachta, was, according to medieval Irish legend and historical tradition, a High King of Ireland. He succeeded to the throne on the death of his uncle Géde Ollgothach, whom, according to some versions, he had killed. His epithet findoilches means "white or fair hidden one", although some sources call him Fíachu Cendfinnán ("little white/fair head"), perhaps confusing him with the much earlier Fir Bolg king of that name. It is said that all the cattle, or flowers, of Ireland had white heads in his reign, and that he exacted a tax on white-headed cattle. He founded Kells, County Meath. He is said to have been the first king in Ireland to dig wells, but grain did not stay on the stalk in his reign. He ruled for either twenty or thirty years, and was killed by Géde Ollgothach's son Berngal in revenge for his father. The chronology of Geoffrey Keating's Foras Feasa ar Éirinn dates his reign to 863–833 BC, that of the Annals of the Four Masters to 1231–1209 BC.

Preceded by Géde Ollgothach	High King of Ireland; AFM 1231–1209 BC; FFE 863–833 BC	Succeeded by Berngal
