= Siomón Brecc =

Medieval High King of Ireland

Siomón Brecc ("the speckled, spotted, ornamented"), son of Áedan Glas, son of Nuadu Finn Fáil, was, according to medieval Irish legend and historical tradition, a High King of Ireland. He took power after killing the previous incumbent, Sétna Innarraid, who ruled for six years and was killed by Sétna's son Dui Finn. The Lebor Gabála Érenn synchronises his reign with that of Xerxes I of the Achaemenid Empire (485–465 BC). The chronology of Geoffrey Keating's Foras Feasa ar Éirinn dates his reign to 685–679 BC, that of the Annals of the Four Masters to 910–904 BC.

Preceded by Sétna Innarraid	High King of Ireland; LGE 5th century BC; FFE 685–679 BC; AFM 910–904 BC	Succeeded by Dui Finn
