= Finnat Már =

Finnat Már ("the great", later spellings Innatmar, Ionnadmhar) son of Nia Segamain, was, according to medieval Irish legend and historical tradition, a High King of Ireland. He succeeded to the throne after the death of Rudraige mac Sithrigi of plague, but after a reign of one, three or nine years he was killed by Rudraige's son Bresal Bó-Díbad. The Lebor Gabála Érenn synchronises his reign with that of Ptolemy X Alexander I (110–88 BC) in Egypt. The chronology of Geoffrey Keating's Foras Feasa ar Éirinn dates his reign to 154–151 BC, that of the Annals of the Four Masters to 219–210 BC.

Preceded by Rudraige mac Sithrigi	High King of Ireland; LGE 2nd–1st century BC; FFE 154–151 BC; AFM 219–210 BC	Succeeded by Bresal Bó-Díbad
