= Fiachna =

Fiachna or Fiachnae is a name borne by several figures from Irish history and legend, including:

- Fiachnae mac Báetáin, king of the Dál nAraidi in the 7th century
- Fiachnae mac Demmáin, king of the Dál Fiatach in the 7th century
- Fiachan of Lismore, (died 630), early Irish monk who was venerated as a saint.
- Fiachnae mac Áedo Róin, (died 789), king of Ulaid
- Fiachna Ó Braonáin (born 1965), Irish rock musician (Hothouse Flowers)

== Similar names ==
- Fiach
- Fiacha
- Fiachra
