= Feradach Finnfechtnach =

1st-century High King of Ireland

Feradach Finnfechtnach (modern spelling: Fearadhach Fionnfeachtnach - "fair-blessed"), son of Crimthann Nia Náir, was, according to medieval Irish legend and historical tradition, a High King of Ireland. There is some disagreement in the sources over his position in the traditional sequence of High Kings.

The Lebor Gabála Érenn and the Annals of the Four Masters agree that he came to power after the death of Cairbre Cinnchait. The Annals say that when Cairbre overthrew his father, his mother, Baine, daughter of the king of Alba, was pregnant with him, but this would make him less than five years old when he came to the throne: it is likely this is a doublet of a similar story told of the later High King Tuathal Techtmar. The Annals also add that Ireland was fertile during his reign, contrasting it with the barren reign of the usurper Cairbre. Geoffrey Keating has Feradach succeed his father Crimthann, placing Cairbre's reign later. Keating relates that the judge Morann mac Máin (who in the Lebor Gabála and the Annals is the son of Cairbre and his wife Mani) lived in Feradach's time. Morann owned the id Morainn (Morann's collar or torc) which would contract around the neck of a judge who made an unjust judgement until he made a just one, or of a witness who made a false testimony until he told the truth.

Feradach ruled for twenty years according to the Lebor Gabála and Keating, twenty-two according to the Annals, before dying a natural death at Liathdroim, an ancient name for the Hill of Tara. In all sources he was succeeded by Fíatach Finn. The Lebor Gabála synchronises his reign with that of the Roman emperor Domitian (AD 81–96) and the death of Pope Clement I (AD 99). The chronology of Keating's Foras Feasa ar Éirinn dates his reign to AD 5–25, that of the Annals of the Four Masters to AD 14–36.

Preceded by LGE/AFM Cairbre Cinnchait; FFE Crimthann Nia Náir	High King of Ireland; LGE 1st century AD; FFE AD 5–25; AFM AD 14–36	Succeeded by Fíatach Finn
