= Óengus Olmucaid =

- High King of Ireland
- Reign: c. 1480–1460 BC
- Coronation: Hill of Tara
- Predecessor: Eochu Mumu
- Successor: Fíachu Tolgrach
- Born: unknown Ireland
- Died: c. 1460 BC; Ireland
- House: Milesian
- Father: unknown
- Mother: unknown
- Religion: Celtic polytheism

Óengus Olmucaid (or Aengus Olmucada), son of Fíachu Labrainne, was, according to medieval Irish legend and historical tradition, a High King of Ireland. During the reign of his father, he conquered Scotland. He came to power by killing the incumbent High King, Eochu Mumu, who had killed his father twenty-one years earlier. He fought many battles against the Cruithne, the Fir Bolg, the Fomorians and other peoples of Ireland, the people of the Orkney islands, and even the Longobardi. He was killed by Enna Airgdech, son of Eochu Mumu, in the battle of Carman, continuing the feud between the descendants of Erimon and Éber Finn. Geoffrey Keating, who interprets his epithet as meaning "great hogs", dates his reign to 1050–1032 BC, the Annals of the Four Masters to 1428–1410 BC.

Preceded by Eochu Mumu	High King of Ireland; AFM 1428–1410 BC; FFE 1050–1032 BC	Succeeded by Enna Airgdech
