= Eochu mac Ailella =

Eochu (or Eochaid), son of Ailill Finn, was, according to medieval Irish legend and historical tradition, a High King of Ireland. He succeeded to the throne after his father was killed by Airgetmar and his ally Dui Ladrach. According to the Lebor Gabála Érenn, he was himself killed by Airgetmar and Dui. Geoffrey Keating says he ruled for seven years, resisted Airgetmar and made peace with Dui, who killed him treacherously at a meeting, allowing Airgetmar to take the kingship. The Lebor Gabála synchronises his reign with that of Artaxerxes II of Persia (404–358 BC). The chronology of Keating's Foras Feasa ar Éirinn dates his reign to 577–570 BC, that of the Annals of the Four Masters to 785–778 BC.

Preceded by Ailill Finn	High King of Ireland; LGE 5th/4th century BC; FFE 577–570 BC; AFM 785–778 BC	Succeeded by Airgetmar
