= Mug Corb =

Mug Corb ("servant of the chariot", sometimes called Mac Corb, "son of the chariot"), son of Cobthach Cáem, son of Rechtaid Rígderg, was, according to medieval Irish legend and historical tradition, a High King of Ireland. He took power when he killed his predecessor, Meilge Molbthach. He ruled for six years, until he was killed by Óengus Ollom, grandson of Labraid Loingsech. He is said to have got his name when he repaired a broken chariot for his son. The Lebor Gabála Érenn synchronises his reign with that of Ptolemy III Euergetes of Egypt (246–222 BC). The chronology of Geoffrey Keating's Foras Feasa ar Éirinn dates his reign to 362–355 BC, the Annals of the Four Masters to 506–499 BC.

Preceded by Meilge Molbthach	High King of Ireland; LGE 3rd century BC; FFE 362–355 BC; AFM 506–499 BC	Succeeded by Óengus Ollom
