= Sethna =

Sethna is a (Parsi-)Gujarati surname meaning "pertaining to (-na) the ombudsman/broker/administrator/supervisor(seth-)", and may refer to:

- Adi M. Sethna, Indian general
- Beheruz Sethna, academic
- Homi Sethna, chemical engineer
- Kaikhosru Dadhaboy (K. D.) Sethna, poet, philosopher and cultural critic
- Pheroze Sethna, Indian politician
