= Lugaid Íardonn =

Lugaid Íardonn, son of Énna Derg, was, according to medieval Irish legend and historical tradition, a High King of Ireland. His epithet, Old Irish for "dark brown", came from the colour of his hair. He succeeded his father, who had died of plague, to the throne, and ruled for nine years before he was killed at Ráth Clochair by Sírlám, son of Finn mac Blatha. The Lebor Gabála Érenn synchronises his reign with that of Artaxerxes I of Persia (465–424 BC). The chronology of Geoffrey Keating's Foras Feasa ar Éirinn dates his reign to 658–649 BC, that of the Annals of the Four Masters to 881–872 BC.

Preceded by Énna Derg	High King of Ireland; LGE 5th century BC; FFE 658–649 BC; AFM 881–872 BC	Succeeded by Sírlám
