= Sedna Finance =

Sedna Finance was an SIV managed by Citi group. It was notable for being the first modern 3 tier structured SIV. It was not, however, the first 3 tier SIV, as much older SIV's such as Asset Backed Capital (now Orion Finance) used 3 tier structures; these old structures used much larger proportions of junior capital to mezzanine capital. As of 2007, it had a balance sheet of approximately $10bn. It was shut down in the fall of 2007, in the first phase of the financial crisis.
