= Sétna Innarraid =

Sétna Innarraid ("of wages, stipend, reward"), son of Bres Rí, was, according to medieval Irish legend and historical tradition, a High King of Ireland. He is said to have been the first Irish king to pay his soldiers. He ruled for twenty years, before he was killed by Siomón Brecc, grandson of Nuadu Finn Fáil. The Lebor Gabála Érenn synchronises his reign with those of Darius the Great (522–485 BC) and Xerxes I (485–465 BC) of Persia. The chronology of Geoffrey Keating's Foras Feasa ar Éirinn dates his reign to 705–685 BC, that of the Annals of the Four Masters to 930–910 BC.

| Preceded by Finn mac Blatha | High King of Ireland; LGE 5th century BC; FFE 705–685 BC; AFM 930–910 BC | Succeeded by Siomón Brecc |
