= Fiachra =

Fiachra is an Irish male given name. It may refer to:

== Clerics ==
- Saint Fiacre of Breuil (died 670), missionary in France
- Fiachra mac Colmain (500–558) Bishop of Armagh
- Fiachra Ua Focarta (died 1006) abbot of Clonfert
- Fiachra Ó Ceallaigh (born 1933) bishop of Dublin

== Legendary kings ==
- Fiachrae son of Eochaid Mugmedon and namesake of Tireragh, County Sligo
- Fiachra Suighe legendary pre-Christian founder of the Dal Fiachrach Suighe
- Fiacha mac Delbaíth, legendary High King

== Medieval kings ==
- Fiachra Cossalach (died 710) king in Ulster
- Fiachra Finn (fl 5th century) king of Uí Maine in Connacht

== Sportsmen ==
- Fiachra McArdle (b.1983) association footballer
- Fiachra Breathnach (b.1986) Gaelic footballer from Galway
- Fiachra Lynch (b.1987) Gaelic footballer from Cork

== Other ==
- Fiachra, mythological son of Ler from the Children of Lir legend
- Fiachra Mac Brádaigh (1690–1760) writer
- Fiachra Trench (b.1941) composer

== See also ==
- Fiach
- Fiacha
- Fiachna
- List of Irish-language given names
