= Fíachu Labrainne =

- High King of Ireland
- Reign: c. 1520–1500 BC
- Coronation: Hill of Tara
- Predecessor: Eochaid Faebar Glas
- Successor: Eochu Mumu
- Born: unknown Ireland
- Died: c. 1500 BC; Ireland
- House: Milesian
- Father: Enboth
- Mother: unknown
- Religion: Celtic polytheism

Fíachu Labhrainne, son of Smirgoll, son of Enboth, son of Tigernmas, was, according to medieval Irish legend and historical tradition, a High King of Ireland. He came to power by killing the previous incumbent, Eochaid Faebar Glas, in the battle of Carman, in vengeance for his father, who had been killed by Eochaid in the battle of Druimm Liatháin. He was named after the river Labrainn, which burst from the ground during his reign. He fought a sea battle against the descendants of Éber Finn, and fought a battle against the Érainn at Mag Genainn in County Fermanagh, which resulted in Loch Erne bursting from the ground. In another battle he killed Eochaid's son Mofebis. Mofebis's son Eochu Mumu killed him in vengeance in the battle of Sliab Belgatain. Geoffrey Keating adds that during his reign, his son Aengus Olmucada conquered Scotland. The Lebor Gabála Érenn synchronises his reign with those of Piritiades and Ofratalus in Assyria. The chronology of Keating's Foras Feasa ar Éirinn dates his reign to 1095–1071 BC, that of the Annals of the Four Masters to 1473–1449 BC.

Preceded by Eochaid Faebar Glas	High King of Ireland; AFM 1473–1449 BC; FFE 1095–1071 BC	Succeeded by Eochu Mumu
