= Lugaid Luaigne =

Lugaid Luaigne, son of Finnat Már, was, according to medieval Irish legend and historical tradition, a High King of Ireland. He came to power after killing his predecessor, and his father's killer, Bresal Bó-Díbad, and ruled for five or fifteen years, before he was killed by Congal Cláiringnech. The Lebor Gabála Érenn synchronises his reign with that of Ptolemy X Alexander I (110–88 BC) in Egypt. The chronology of Geoffrey Keating's Foras Feasa ar Éirinn dates his reign to 140–135 BC, that of the Annals of the Four Masters to 199–184 BC.

Although presented as an ancestor of the Eóganachta in later medieval genealogies, Lugaid is regarded by T. F. O'Rahilly as one of several late emanations of Lugaid Loígde, ancestor of the Corcu Loígde.

Preceded by Bresal Bó-Díbad	High King of Ireland; LGE 2nd–1st century BC; FFE 140–135 BC; AFM 199–184 BC	Succeeded by Congal Cláiringnech
