= Fíachu Tolgrach =

Fíachu Tolgrach, son of Muiredach Bolgrach, was a legendary High King of Ireland, according to some medieval and early modern Irish sources. In the Lebor Gabála Érenn he is not a High King: he kills the former High King Art mac Lugdach, but during the reign of Art's son Ailill Finn he is killed in battle against Airgetmar. His son Dui Ladrach later becomes High King. However, in Geoffrey Keating's Foras Feasa ar Éirinn and the Annals of the Four Masters he succeeds Art as High King and rules for seven or ten years, until he is killed by Ailill Finn, who succeeds him. The chronology of Keating's Foras Feasa ar Éirinn dates his reign to 593–586 BC, that of the Annals of the Four Masters to 806–796 BC.

Preceded by Art mac Lugdach	High King of Ireland; FFE 593–586 BC; AFM 806–796 BC	Succeeded by Ailill Finn
