= Fínnachta =

Fínnachta, son of Ollom Fotla, was, according to medieval Irish legend and historical tradition, a High King of Ireland in succession to his father. His given name was Elim. There is said to have been snow of wine (Old Irish fín, "wine", snechta, "snow") in his reign, from which he gained his better-known name. He ruled for twenty years before dying of plague at Mag Inis in Ulster, and was succeeded by his brother Slánoll. The chronology of Geoffrey Keating's Foras Feasa ar Éirinn dates his reign to 913–895 BC, that of the Annals of the Four Masters to 1278–1258 BC.

Preceded by Ollom Fotla	High King of Ireland; AFM 1278–1258 BC; FFE 913–895 BC	Succeeded by Slánoll
