= Meilge Molbthach =

Irish king

Meilge Molbthach ("the praiseworthy"), son of Cobthach Cóel Breg, was, according to medieval Irish legend and historical tradition, a High King of Ireland. He took power after killing his predecessor, and his father's killer, Labraid Loingsech. He ruled for seven or seventeen years, until he was killed by Mug Corb, grandson of Rechtaid Rígderg, in Munster. It is said that when his grave was dug, a lake burst over the land, which was called Loch Meilge after him. The Lebor Gabála Érenn synchronises his reign with that of Ptolemy III Euergetes of Egypt (246–222 BC). The chronology of Geoffrey Keating's Foras Feasa ar Éirinn dates his reign to 369–362 BC, the Annals of the Four Masters to 523–506 BC.

Preceded by Labraid Loingsech	High King of Ireland; LGE 3rd century BC; FFE 369–362 BC; AFM 523–506 BC	Succeeded by Mug Corb
