= Fíachu Fínscothach =

Fíacha Fínscothach, son of Sétna Airt, was, according to medieval Irish legend and historical tradition, a High King of Ireland. His father became High King after killing the previous incumbent, Rothechtaid mac Main, in single combat at Cruachan in defence of Fíachu. Fíachu went into exile, but returned at the head of a "black fleet", and, with the assistance of Muinemón, killed his father and took the throne himself. "Flowers of wine" (Old Irish: fín "wine" + scoth "flower" + -ach, possessive suffix, although scoth can also mean "blade" and "voice"), which were pressed into glass vats, were said to exist during his reign. He ruled for twenty years, until he was killed by his former accomplice, Muinemón. The chronology of Geoffrey Keating's Foras Feasa ar Éirinn dates his reign to 975–955 BC, that of the Annals of the Four Masters to 1353–1333 BC.

Preceded by Sétna Airt	High King of Ireland; AFM 1353–1333 BC; FFE 975–955 BC	Succeeded by Muinemón
