= Sírlám =

Sírlám, son of Finn mac Blatha, was, according to medieval Irish legend and historical tradition, a High King of Ireland. He took power after killing his predecessor, Lugaid Íardonn, in Ráth Clochair. His name means "long hand" or "long arm", and it is said his arms reached the ground when was standing up (compare the Irish god Lug, whose epithet lámfada also means "long arm"). He ruled for thirteen years according to the Lebor Gabála Érenn, or sixteen according to Geoffrey Keating and the Four Masters. He drove Lugaid's son Eochu Uairches into exile, but after twelve years overseas Eochu returned and killed him with an arrow. The Lebor Gabála synchronises his reign with that of Artaxerxes I of Persia (465–424 BC). The chronology of Keating's Foras Feasa ar Éirinn dates his reign to 649–633 BC, that of the Annals of the Four Masters to 872–856 BC.

Preceded by Lugaid Íardonn	High King of Ireland; LGE 5th century BC; FFE 649–633 BC; AFM 872–856 BC	Succeeded by Eochu Uairches
