= Geoffrey Keating =

Irish historian

- Born: c. 1569; County Tipperary, Ireland
- Died: c. 1644 (aged 74–75)
- Burial place: Tubrid Graveyard, Ballylooby-Duhill, Munster
- Education: University of Bordeaux
- Occupations: Catholic priest and poet
- Notable work: Foras Feasa ar Éirinn (History of Ireland)

Geoffrey Keating (Irish: Seathrún Céitinn; c. 1569 – c. 1644) was an Irish historian. He was born in County Tipperary, Ireland, and is buried in Tubrid Graveyard in the parish of Ballylooby-Duhill. He became a Catholic priest and a poet.

== Biography ==
It was generally believed until recently that Keating had been born in Burgess, County Tipperary; indeed, a monument to Keating was raised beside the bridge at Burgess, in 1990; but Diarmuid Ó Murchadha writes,

The presumption that Geoffrey Keating attended a bardic school at Burgess, County Tipperary, is attributable to Thomas O'Sullevane, a shadowy character from the fringes of literary circles in London. The same unreliable source names Burgess as Keating's place of birth, whereas recent work (Cunningham 2002) indicates that Moorstown Castle in the parish of Inishlounaght [in Tipperary] was his probable birthplace.

In November 1603, he was one of forty students who sailed for Bordeaux under the charge of the Rev. Diarmaid MacCarthy to begin their studies at the Irish College which had just been founded in that city by Cardinal François de Sourdis, Archbishop of Bordeaux. On his arrival in France he wrote Farewell to Ireland, and upon hearing of the Flight of the Earls wrote Lament on the Sad State of Ireland. After obtaining the degree of Doctor of Divinity at the University of Bordeaux he returned about 1610 to Ireland and was appointed to the cure of souls at Uachtar Achaidh in the parish of Knockgraffan, near Cahir, where he put a stop to the then-common practice of delaying Mass until the neighbouring gentry arrived.

His major works are Foras Feasa ar Éirinn (Foundation of Knowledge on Ireland, more usually translated History of Ireland), was written in Early Modern Irish and completed c. 1634 and Trí bior-ghaoithe an bháis (The three shafts of death) c. 1631.

The Foras Feasa traced the history of Ireland from the creation of the world to the invasion of the Normans in the 12th century, based on the rich native historical and mythological traditions (including that of the Milesians), Irish bardic poetry, monastic annals, and other ecclesiastical records. The Foras Feasa circulated in manuscript, as Ireland's English administration would not give authority to have it printed because of its pro-Catholic arguments. It was still a time of repression; in 1634 a political campaign for a general reform of anti-Catholic religious persecution, known as the Graces, was denied by the Viceroy.

Having Old English ancestry, Keating held the political view that Ireland's nobility and natural leadership derived from the surviving Irish clan chiefs and Old English landed families who had remained Catholic. He also accepted the House of Stuart as lawful kings of Ireland, which had a long-term influence on both Irish Confederate and Jacobites until Papal recognition of the Stuart claim finally ended in 1766. Keating continued to influence Irish genealogical writers such as John O'Hart into the 1800s.

== Works ==
Edited and translated works:

- O'Connor, Dermod, ed. (1723), The General History of Ireland (For a list of versions see Foras Feasa ar Éirinn)
- Keating, Geoffrey (1890), Atkinson, Robert (ed.), Trí bior-ghaoithe an bháis [The three shafts of death] (in Irish), Royal Irish Academy
- Keating, Geoffrey (1898), O'Brien, Patrick (ed.), Eochairsciath an Aifrinn [An explanatory defence of the mass] (in Irish), Dublin Printed and published by Patrick O'Brien
- Keating, Geoffrey (1898), Comyn, David (ed.), Díonḃrollaċ fórais feasa ar Éirinn [Vindication of the sources of Irish History] (in Irish and English), The Gaelic League
- Keating, Geoffrey (1900), Mac Giolla Eain, Eoin Cathmhaolach (ed.), Dánta, Amhráin is Caointe [Poems, Songs and Elegies] (in Irish), The Gaelic League
