= List of Irish kingdoms =

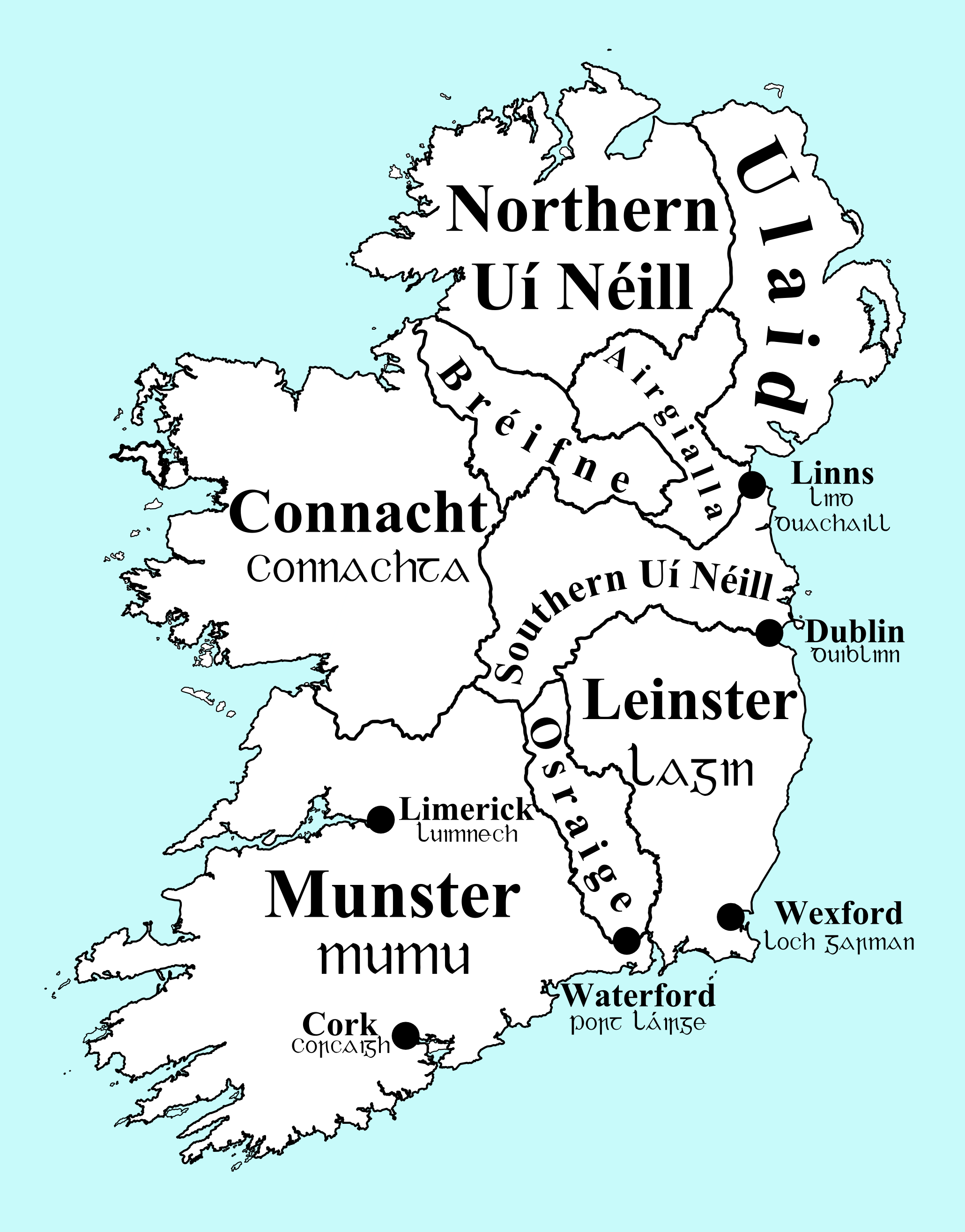
Ireland circa 900

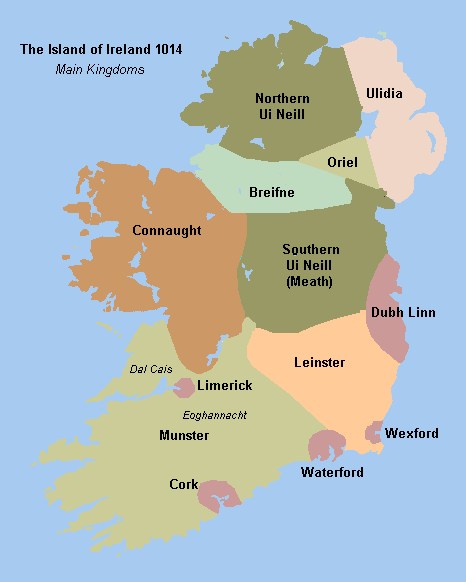
Ireland in 1014

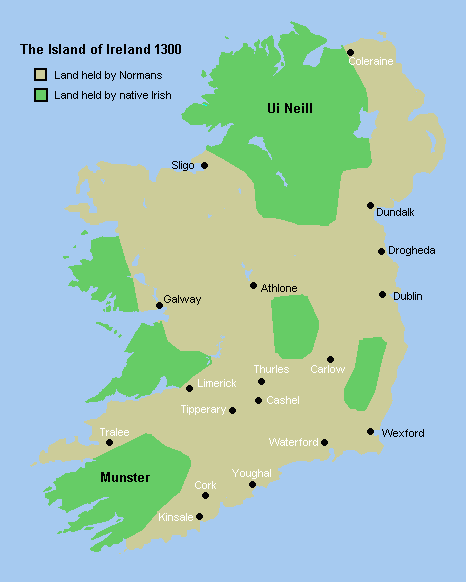
Maximal extent of the Norman Lordship of Ireland in 1300.

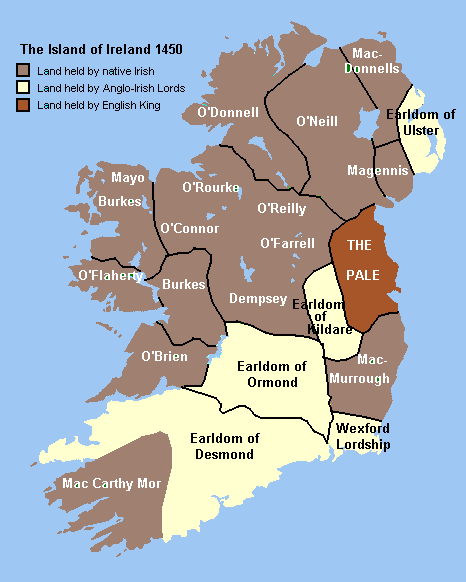
Ireland in 1450

This article lists some of the attested Gaelic kingdoms of early medieval Ireland prior to the Norman invasion of 1169–1172.

For much of this period, the island was divided into numerous clan territories and kingdoms (known as túatha). These túatha often competed for control of resources and thus they continually grew and shrank (in both size and number). In addition to kingdoms or túatha, Gaelic Ireland was also divided into five prime overkingdoms (Old Irish cóiceda, Modern Irish cúige). These were Ulaid (in the north), Connacht (in the west), Laighin (in the southeast), Mumhan (in the south) and Mide (in the centre).

After the Norman invasion, much of the island came under the control of the Lordship of Ireland, although some parts remained under the control of Gaelic dynasties. After 1350, Norman control began to weaken, and a "Gaelic resurgence" took place which resulted in the direct influence of the Parliament of Ireland shrinking to an area known as The Pale by 1500. In 1541, the Kingdom of Ireland was established by Henry VIII, and the Tudor conquest of Ireland commenced. The repudiation of the terms of the Treaty of Mellifont by the Crown resulted in the Nine Years War and the Flight of the Earls, which marked the end of the Gaelic order.

== Earliest times ==
- Darini, in Tyrone, Armagh and Down, possibly a branch of the Érainn and linked with their supposed ancestor deity Dáire
- Erdini in County Fermanagh
- Robogdii, in Antrim and Londonderry
- Venicnii in County Donegal
- Voluntii, probably the people later known as the Ulaid, in Armagh, Down, Monaghan and Cavan

== Early Christian ==
- Airgíalla or Oirghialla or Oriel
- Airthir
- Cairpre Droma Cliab
- Cenél Conaill (Tir Chonaill)
- Cenél nEogain (Tir Eogain)
- Conaille Muirtheimne
- Cruithne
- Dál nAraidi
- Dál Fiatach
- Dál Riata
- Dartraige
- Dartraige Con-innsi
- Eilne
- Fir Manach
- Iveagh
- Osraige
- Uí Echach Cobo
- Northern Uí Néill
- Ulaid

== From the 12th century ==
- East Breifne

== Meath ==
=== Earliest times ===
- Ebdani, Eblani or Blanii (probably variants of the same name)

=== Early Christian ===
- Ciannachta
- Southern Uí Néill
- Brega
- Lagore
- Cnogba
- Tethbae (Old Irish pronunciation: [ˈt̠ʲeθβe]; also spelled Tethba, often anglicised Teffia
- Annaly
- Cairpre Gabra

== Leinster ==
=== Earliest times ===
- Brigantes in south Wexford, also known from northern Britain; possibly linked with the goddess Brigit
- Cauci around Dublin
- Coriondi north Wexford
- Menapii in County Wicklow, also known from Gaul; their name is linked to Fermanagh and Monaghan, although they are much further north
- Osraige

=== Early Christian ===
- Kingdom of Dublin
- Uí Ceinnselaig
- Uí Dúnlainge

=== From the 12th century ===
- Kingdom of Leinster, see also Kings of Leinster.

== Munster ==
=== Earliest times ===
- Gangani or Concani in Counties Limerick and Clare; also lived in Wales – Ptolemy calls the Llŷn Peninsula the "Promontory of the Gangani"
- Iverni in County Cork, later known as the Érainn
- Luceni in Counties Kerry and Limerick
- Usdiae, Udiae or Vodiae in Counties Waterford and Cork, possibly related to the later Osraige
- Uterni in Cork
- Vellabori or Velabri in Kerry

=== Early Christian ===
- Builg
- Corcu Baiscind
- Corcu Duibne
- Corcu Loígde
- Dáirine
- Dál gCais
- Deirgtine
- Déisi
- Eóganachta
- Érainn
- Iarmuman
- Mairtine
- Múscraige
- Uí Fidgenti
- Uí Liatháin

=== From the 12th century ===
- Kingdom of Desmond
- Kingdom of Thomond
- Kingdom of Ormond

== Connacht ==
=== Earliest times ===
- Auteini in County Galway, identified with the later Uaithne
- Nagnatae in County Mayo and County Sligo, possibly linked with the Ol nÉcmacht; Cóiced Ol nEchmacht was an ancient name for Connacht.

=== Early Christian ===
- Aidhne or Uí Fiachrach Aidhne
- Breifne
- Conmaicne Mara
- Connachta
- Corco Moga
- Delbhna
- Delbhna Nuadat
- Delbhna Tir Dha Locha
- Fir Domnann (aka Irrus Domnann)
- Hy Briuin Ai
- Hy Diarmata
- Hy Fiachrach Aidhne
- Hy Fiachrach Fionn
- Hy Fiachrach Muaidhe
- Hy-Many
- Iar Connacht
- Kinela
- Moylurg
- Muintir Murchada
- Partraige
- Síol Anmchadha
- Síol Muirdeach
- Soghan
- Tyrconnell
- Uí Fiachrach

=== From the 12th century ===
- Clanricarde
- Mac William Íochtar
- West Breifne

== See also ==
- Irish nobility
- Pre-Norman invasion Irish Celtic kinship groups
- Irish clans
- List of Irish clans
- MacDunleavy (dynasty)
- Monarchy of Ireland
- O'Donnell dynasty
