= Ptolemy's map of Ireland =

Ancient map of Ireland

Ptolemy's map of Ireland is a part of his "first European map" in the series of maps included in his Geography, which he compiled in the second century AD in Roman Egypt and which is the oldest surviving map of Ireland. Ptolemy's own map does not survive, but is known from manuscript copies made during the Middle Ages and from the text of the Geography, which gives coordinates and place names. Ptolemy almost certainly never visited Ireland, but compiled the map based on military, trader, and traveller reports, along with his own mathematical calculations. Given the creation process, the time period involved, and the fact that the Greeks and Romans had limited contact with Ireland, it is considered remarkably accurate.

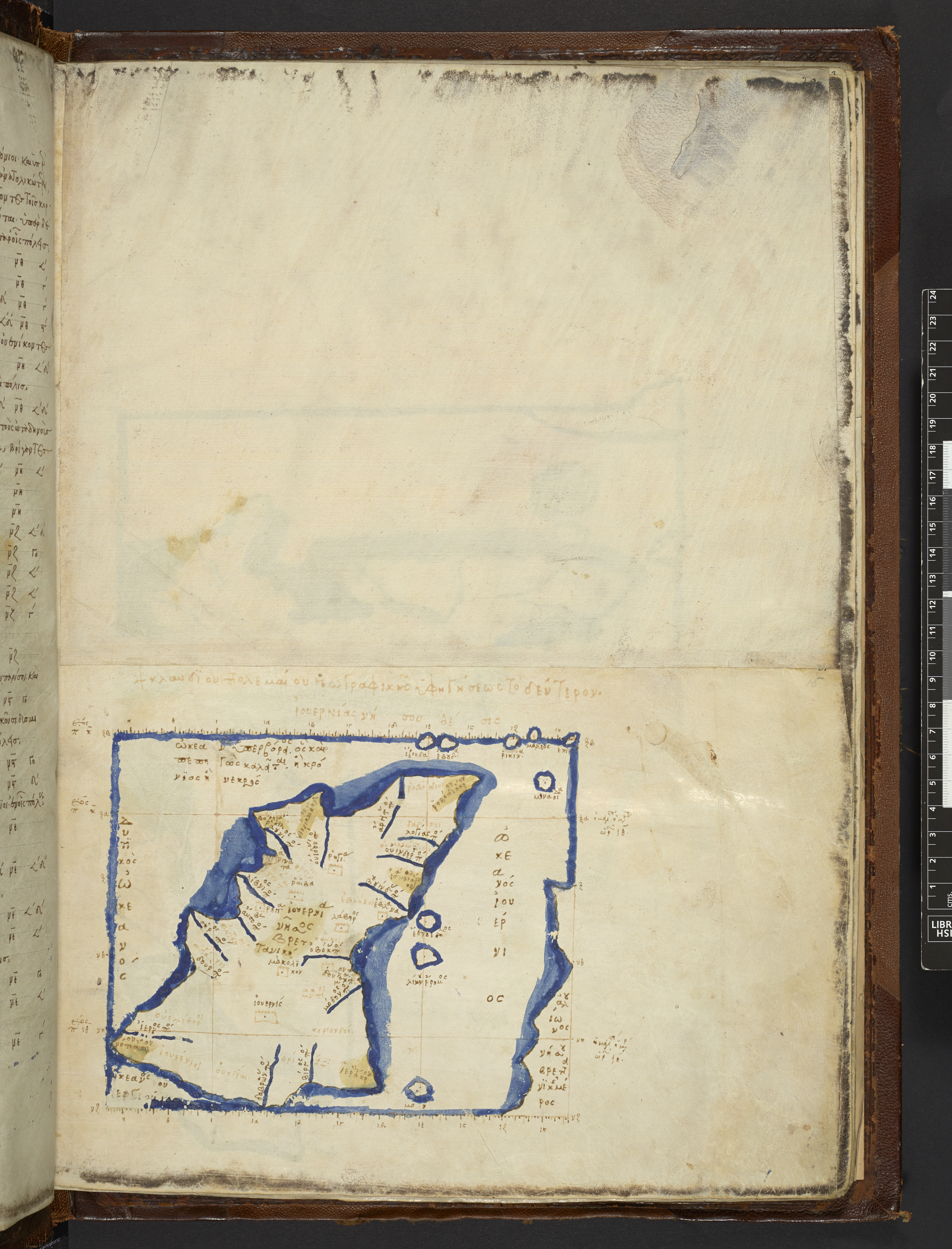
The westernmost portion of Ptolemy's "first European map" from a Greek manuscript edition of Geography, dated c. 1400, once owned by Charles Burney and now in the British Library, depicting Ireland. The island is labelled in Ancient Greek: Ἰουερνία νῆσος Βρεττανική, romanized: Iouernía nê̄sos Brettanikḗ, lit. 'Hibernia, British island'.

== Creation of the map ==
The map of Ireland is included on the "first European map" sections (Ancient Greek: Εὐρώπης πίναξ αʹ, romanized: Eurōpēs pínax alpha or Latin: Prima Europe tabula) of Ptolemy's Geography (also known as the Geographia and the Cosmographia). The "first European map" is described in the second and third chapters of the work's second book. The second chapter (Ancient Greek: Κεφ. βʹ Ἰουερνίας νήσου Βρεττανικῆς θέσις, romanized: Iouernías nḗsou Brettanikê̄s thésis, lit. 'Ch. 2, position of Hibernia, British island') deals with Ireland, the third with Great Britain.

Ptolemy, living 4,000 km (2,500 mi) southeast of Ireland in Roman Egypt, produced an interpretation of the world based on the writings available such as texts accessible in the Library of Alexandria. In 2006, R. Darcy and William Flynn described his map of Ireland as "a long exposure photograph in the sense that it most likely represents points recorded not instantaneously but over time, written down and fixed at roughly AD 100".

=== Ireland in the Roman imperial period ===
Ireland (Ancient Greek: Ἰουερνία, romanized: Iouernía or Latin: Hibernia) was known to the Romans and may have been partially colonised by them. Tacitus mentioned the island in his writings as "a small country in comparison with Britain, but larger than the islands of the Mediterranean. In soil and climate, and in the character and civilisation of its inhabitants, it is much like Britain". Ancient remains at Stoneyford in County Kilkenny and Loughshinny in County Dublin may indicate a Roman presence at these sites.

=== Methodology ===
The work known as the Geography included guidelines on how to 'flatten' the image – or represent a 3D object on a 2D surface – of the Earth when constructing maps. Ptolemy believed in a spherical Earth within a geocentric model of the universe, and based his calculations of longitudes and latitudes on this foundational principle. Determining the obliquity of the ecliptic, the tilt of the Earth relative to the perceived movement of the Sun in the sky, his work became "the foundation of all astronomical science" in analysing the angle of the Sun during the longest day for locations on different parallels of longitude".

The Geographia was not well known in the Western Roman Empire and was lost by the collapse of the empire in the late fifth century. However, there are indications it was known in the Eastern Empire. A Greek manuscript copy of the work now in the British Library was produced around 1400, and the map is oriented with south at the top.

=== Precision ===
Ptolemy underestimated the length of the equator by 18% and this had an impact on all his maps. One result of this is that his latitudinal estimates are more accurate than his longitudinal ones. The reports he received would have had better directional information (towards the sunrise/sunset, at a left/right angle to the sun at noon) than on distance (five days' journey from Roman Gaul). The west coast is poorly represented compared to the other three, and identification of the names Ptolemy gives is speculative. This is consistent with the Romans having less contact with Irish communities in this region.

== Communities identified ==
The peoples listed by Ptolemy as inhabiting the north coast are the Wenniknioi in the west and the Rhobogdioi in the east.

Peoples of the west coast are: the Erdinoi near Donegal Bay; the Magnatai or Nagnatai of County Mayo and Sligo; the Auteinoi between County Galway and the Shannon, identifiable with the early medieval Uaithni; the Ganganoi, also known in north Wales; and the Wellaboroi in the far south-west.

Peoples of the south coast are the Iwernoi in the west, who share their name with the island, Iwernia, and can be identified with the early medieval Érainn; the Usdiai; and the Brigantes in the east, who share their name with a people of Roman Britain.

The tribes listed on the east coast are Koriondoi; the Manapioi, possibly related to the Menapii of Gaul; the Kaukoi, probably not related to the Germanic Chauci of the Low Countries; the Eblanoi; the Woluntioi, identifiable with the early medieval Ulaid; and the Darinoi.

== Place names listed ==
In Ireland (Ancient Greek: Ἰουερνία νῆσος Βρεττανική, romanized: Iouernía nễsos Brettaniké, lit. 'Hibernia, British island') Ptolemy references fifteen rivers, six promontories and ten cities. He names and gives the proximate locations of 16 tribes.

=== Rivers and estuaries ===
Ptolemy's "first European map" from a Latin manuscript edition of Geography, dated c. 1450 – c. 1460, illuminated by Francesco di Antonio del Chierico, once owned by Borso d'Este, and now in the Bibliothèque nationale de France, depicting the British Isles. Ireland is labelled in Latin: Hibernia insula Britannica, lit. 'Hibernia, British island'.

- mouth of the river Logia (Λογία ποταμοῦ ἐκβολαί, Logía potamoû ekbolaí) – Belfast Lough (Irish: Loch Laoigh).
- mouth of the river Rhawiu (Ῥαουίου ποταμοῦ ἐκβολαί, Rhoaouíou potamoû ekbolaí, Latin: Ravius) – the River Erne.
- mouth of the river Dur (Δοὺρ ποταμοῦ ἐκβολαί, Doùr potamoû ekbolaí) – Dingle Bay
- mouth of the river Iernu (Ἰέρνου ποταμοῦ ἐκβολαί, Iérnou potamoû ekbolaí, Latin: Iernus)– possibly the River Erne, although it flows into Donegal Bay, much further north, so possibly the Kenmare.
- mouth of the river Widwa (Οὐιδούα (Οὐδία) ποταμοῦ ἐκβολαί, Ouidoúa (Oudía) potamoû ekbolaí, Latin: Vidua (Oudia)) – the River Foyle.
- mouth of the river Buvinda (Βουουίνδα (Βουβίνδα) ποταμοῦ ἐκβολαί, Bououínda (Bouvínda) potamoû ekbolaí) – the River Boyne.
- mouth of the river Oboka (Ὀβόκα ποταμοῦ ἐκβολαί, Obóka potamoû ekbolaí, Latin: Oboca) – possibly the River Liffey or the River Avoca in County Wicklow.
- mouth of the river Modonnu (Μοδόνου (Μοδνούννου) ποταμοῦ ἐκβολαί, Modónou (Modnoúnnou) potamoû ekbolaí, Latin: Modonus (Modnunnus)) – possibly the Slaney, but more likely the Avoca.
- mouth of the river Ausoba (Αὔσοβα ποταμοῦ ἐκβολαί, Aúsoba potamoû ekbolaí) – River Corrib and Lough Corrib (Irish: Loch Oirbsean).
- mouth of the river Argita (Ἀργίτα ποταμοῦ ἐκβολαί, Argíta potamoû ekbolaí) – the River Bann.
- mouth of the river Libniu (Λιβνίου ποταμοῦ ἐκβολαί, Libníou potamoû ekbolaí, Latin: Libnius) – possibly Clew Bay.
- mouth of the river Senu or Sinu (Σήνου (Σίνου) ποταμοῦ ἐκβολαί, Sḗnou (Sínou) potamoû ekbolaí, Latin: Senus) – probably the Shannon Estuary, although placed too far to the north.
- mouth of the river Dabrona (Δαβρώνα ποταμοῦ ἐκβολαί, Dabrṓna potamoû ekbolaí) possibly the River Lee or the Munster Blackwater.
- the mouth of the river Birgu (Βίργου ποταμοῦ ἐκβολαί, Bírgou potamoû ekbolaí, Latin: Birgus) probably the River Barrow.
- mouth of the river Winderios (Οὐινδέριος (Ἰουνδέριος) ποταμοῦ ἐκβολαί, Ouindérios (Ioundérios) potamoû ekbolaí, Latin: Vinderis) – possibly Carlingford Lough, Dundrum Bay or Strangford Lough.

=== Promontories ===
- Fair Head, County Antrim (Ῥοβόγδιον ἄκρον, Robógdion ákron, Latin: Robogdium)
- Carnsore Point (Ἱερὸν ἄκρον, Hieròn ákron, 'Holy Cape')
- the promontory Isamnion (Ἰσάμνιον [ἄκρον], Isámnion [ákron], Latin: Isamnium) – on the east coast.

=== Towns ===
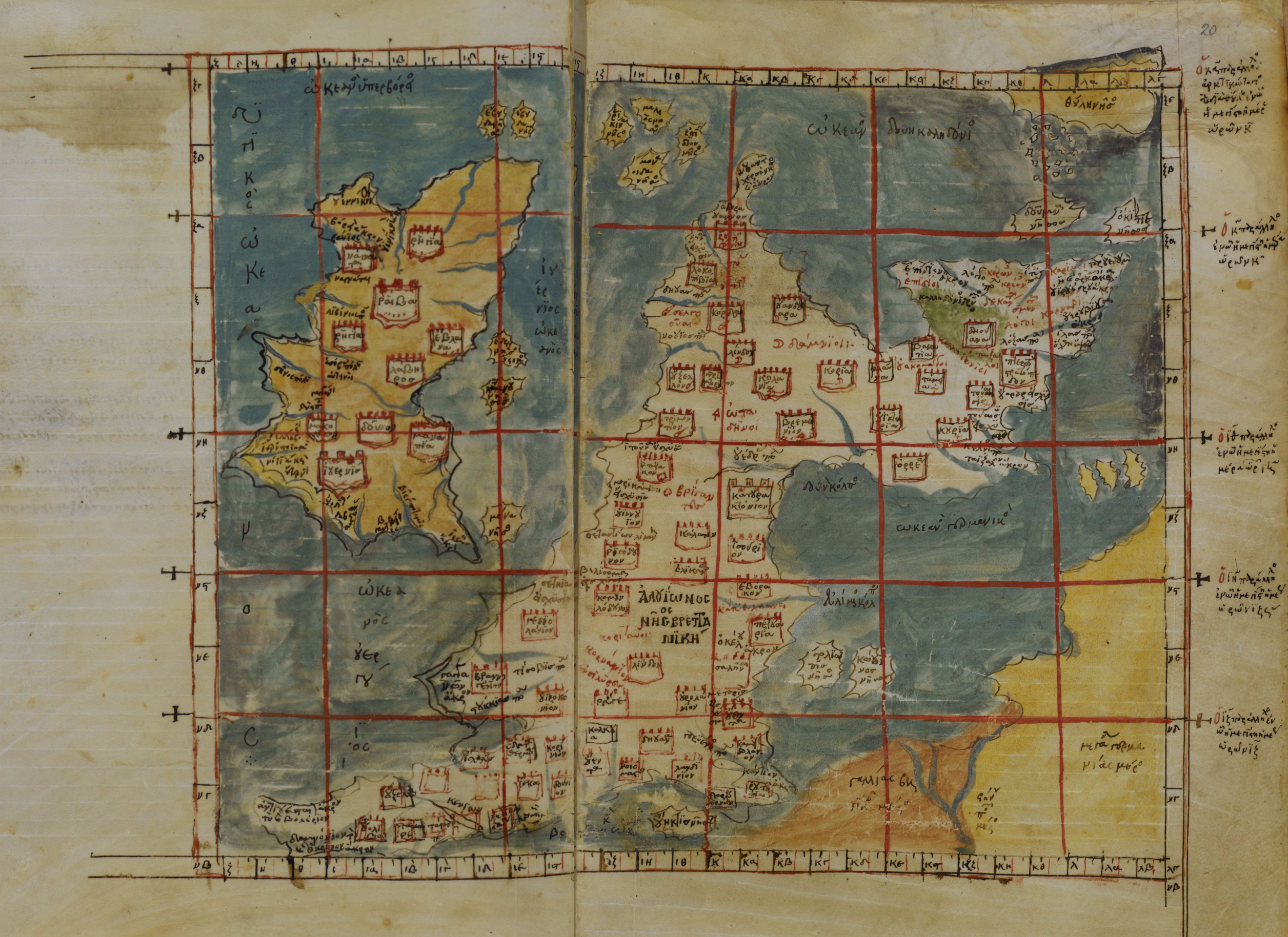
A Greek manuscript copy of the "first European map" from Ptolemy's Geography, made in the early 14th century at Constantinople, later held by the Vatopedi monastery on Mount Athos, and now in the British Library.

- Nagnata or Magnata (Νάγνατα (Μάγνατα) πόλις, Nágnata (Mágnata) pólis) – a settlement of the Nagnatae or Magnatae people, possibly somewhere in County Sligo.
- Eblana (Ἔβλανα πόλις, Éblana pólis) – later site of Dublin.
- Manapia (Μαναπία πόλις, Manapía pólis) – a settlement of the Manapii.

==== Towns of the interior ====
- Raeba (Ῥαίβα (Ῥέβα), Rhaíba (Rhéba)) – possibly the royal site of Cruchain
- Rhegia (Ῥηγία, Rhēgía) – probably the royal seat (Latin: regium) of a local prince.
- Laberos (Λάβηρος, Lábēros, Latin: Laberus)
- Makolikon (Μακόλικον, Makólikon, Latin: Macolicum)
- "a second Rhegia" (ἑτέρα Ῥηγία, hetéra Rhēgía) – probably another seat of a local prince.
- Dounon (Δοῦνον, Doûnon, Latin: Dunum)
- Ivernis (Ἰουερνίς (Ἰερνίς), Iouernís (Iernís), Latin: Hibernis (Iernis)) – Cashel, County Tipperary.

=== Islands ===
Ptolemy's "first European map", dated c. 1501 – c. 1515 and illuminated by the "Master of Edward IV", from a Latin manuscript edition of Geography, made for Louis de Gruuthuse in 1485, and now in the Bibliothèque nationale de France, depicting the British Isles. Ireland is labelled in Latin: Hibernia insula Britannica, lit. 'Hibernia, British island'.

Besides the Irish mainland, Ptolemy names seven islands and mentions an archipelago to the north (the Inner Hebrides) which he says consists of five others. Among the islands he names to the east are the Isle of Man and Anglesey. Three others (Rhikina, Edros and Limnos) may be islands nearby Ireland or may be among the Channel Islands, since Pliny the Elder's Natural History may refer to Alderney, Guernsey, and Jersey with similar names (Riginia, Andros, and Silumnus).

==== North of Ireland ====
- The five Ebudes (Ἐβοῦδαι, Eboûdai, Latin: Eboudae), of which Ptolemy says two are themselves called Ebuda (Ἔβουδα, Ébouda) – probably the Inner Hebrides.
- Rikina or Engarikenna (Ῥικίνα (Ἐγγαρίκεννα), Rhikína (Engaríkenna), Latin: Ricinia (Engaricena)) – possibly Rathlin Island.
- Maleos or Malaïos (Μαλεός (Μαλαῖος), Maleós (Malaîos), Latin: Maleus (Malaeus))
- Epidion (Ἐπίδιον, Epídion, Latin: Epidium)

==== East of Ireland ====
- Monaoeda or Monarina (Μονάοιδα (Μοναρίνα), Monáoida (Monarína)) – Isle of Man.
- the island Mona (Μόνα νῆσος, Móna nê̄sos) – Anglesey.
- the desert island Edros or Adros (Ἔδρου (Ἄδρου) ἔρημος, Édrou (Ádrou) érēmos, Latin: Edrus (Adrus)) – possibly Howth Head.
- the desert island Limnos (Λίμνου ἔρημος, Límnou érēmos, Latin: Limnus) – possibly Lambay Island.

== Legacy ==
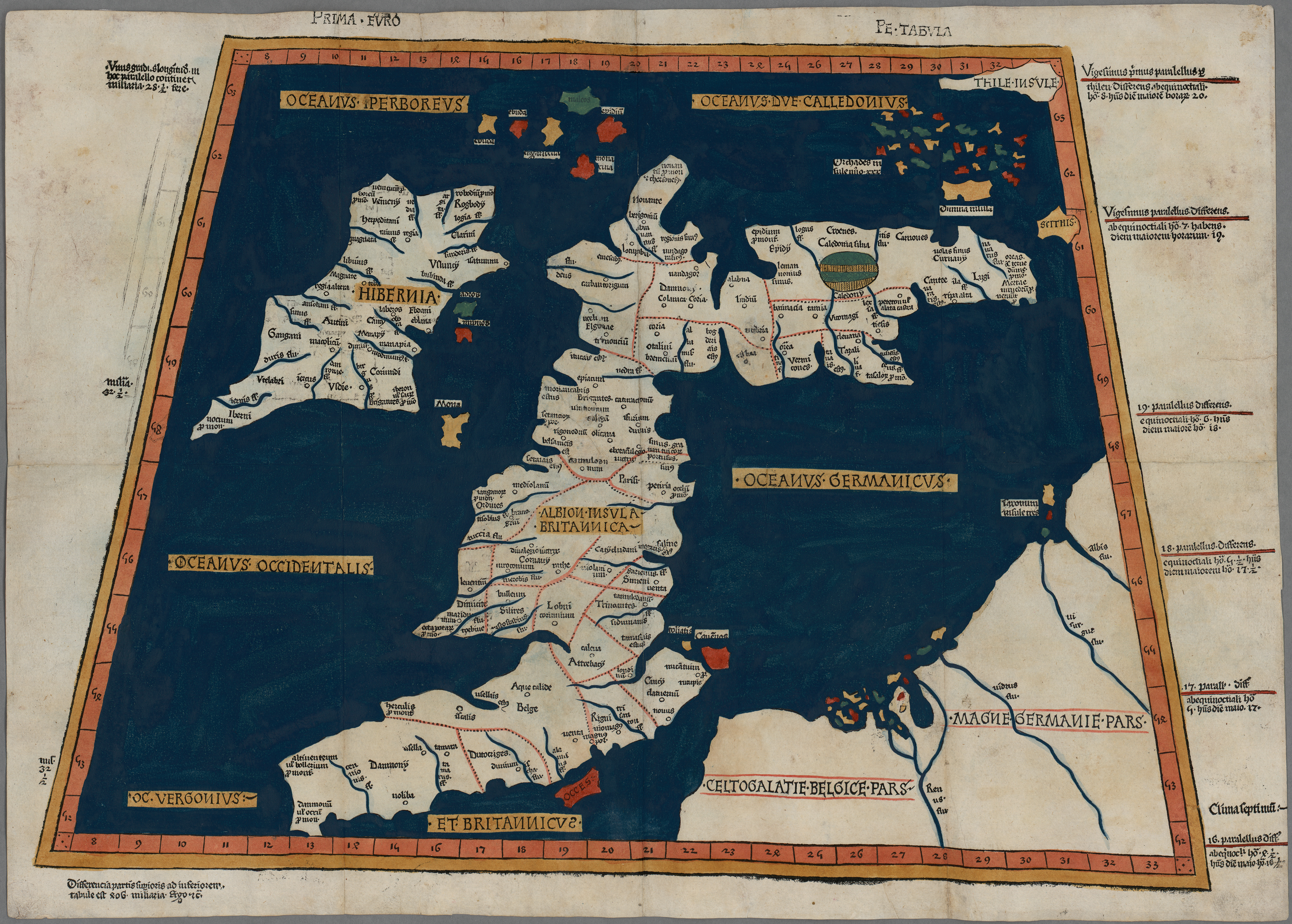
Printed woodcut of Ptolemy's First European Map (Latin: Prima Europe tabula), from a Latin translation of the Geographia published at Ulm in 1486.

A Latin woodcut of the "first European map" published by Johann Reger in Ulm in 1486 and thought to be one of the earliest surviving printed reproductions of the map, was bought by the National Library of Wales Aberystwyth in 2008.

Ptolemy's map of the British Isles remained the prevailing cartographic depiction of Ireland until the early modern period. A portolan chart prepared in Venice by Grazioso Benincasa in 1468 is "the first depiction of Ireland as an island in its own right, rather than as part of the British Isles".
