= Darini =

Ptolemy's tribes of Ireland

The Darini (Δαρῖνοι) (manuscript variant: Darnii [Δάρνιοι]) were a people of ancient Ireland mentioned in Ptolemy's 2nd century Geography as living in south Antrim and north Down. Their name implies descent from an ancestor called Dáire (*Dārios), as claimed by several historical peoples, including the Dál Riata and Dál Fiatach (Ulaidh) in the same area of eastern Ulster as well the Érainn (Iverni) of Munster. An early name for Dundrum, County Down, is recorded as Dún Droma Dáirine, and the name Dáirine was applied to the Érainn dynasty.

== Overview ==
The cognate Dari(o) ("agitation, tumult, rage") is a form widely attested in the Gaulish language, especially in personal names, and exists in the Welsh language as cynddaredd ("rage"). Thus the Darini may have been considered a people "of great violence" and descendants of a so-called "red god". Over time, however, the Irish personal name Dáire would develop the meaning of "rutty" or "violent" apparently following a meaning of "bestial rage".

Dáirine can sometimes refer to the so-called Érainn dynasties altogether and not only to the Corcu Loídge and their corelatives in Munster.

Cú Roí mac Dáire is a king from Munster who appears frequently in the Ulster Cycle possibly reflecting memories of the prehistoric Darini when their power was great in Ireland. The Dál Fiatach of Ulster later claimed descent from his semi-divine clan, the Clanna Dedad, further associating the two provinces—although seemingly in contradiction to their descent from the Ulaid or Voluntii proper, until it is remembered that the Darini and Voluntii lived adjacent to one another in Ptolemy's Ireland and were no doubt ancient kin. Cú Roí's father was Dáire mac Dedad. The Clanna Dedad take their name from his grandfather, Deda mac Sin.

The legendary Conaire Mór, ancestor of the Síl Conairi, or Dál Riata, Múscraige, Corco Duibne, and Corca Baiscinn, was said to descend from Íar mac Dedad, brother of Dáire. This is simply another variant of the root present in Iverni/Érainn. Finally, the name Íth, given in the genealogies as the ultimate ancestor of the Corcu Loígde (Dáirine) and offering some confusion about their parentage and relation to the Iverni, in fact preserves the same Indo-European root *peiH- ("to be fat, swell"), thus in effect completing a basic picture of the Darini/Dáirine and their kindred in later historical Ireland.

== Modern descendants ==
A number of families in the provinces of Ulster and Munster as well as Scotland, trace their origins either among the Darini/Dáirine proper or peoples closely related to them. These include the McMahon/McKenzie, Haughey/Hoey, McNulty/McKinley of Dál Fiatach, and the O'Driscoll and O'Leary of Corcu Loígde.

== See also ==
- Irish nobility
