= Dáire =

Dáire (Irish pronunciation: [ˈd̪ˠaːɾʲə]) was a masculine Old Irish name which fell out of use at an early period, remaining restricted essentially to legendary and ancestral figures. It, as well as its unnacented form Daire, has come back into fashion since the 20th century as a unisex alternative spelling of Darragh.

== Notable people ==
=== Pre-modern era ===
- Dáire Barrach, a Leinster dynast and son of Cathair Mór of the Laigin
- Dáire Cerbba, a Munster dynast of the 4th century
- Dáire Derg, character from the Fenian Cycle possibly identical with Goll mac Morna
- Dáire Doimthech (Sírchréchtach), a legendary King of Tara, ancestor of the Dáirine and Corcu Loígde
- Dáire Donn, "king of the great world" from the Battle of Ventry of the Fenian Cycle
- Dáire Dornmár, a grandson of the legendary Conaire Mór and early king of Dál Riata
- Dáire Drechlethan, a King of Tara of uncertain identity listed in the Baile Chuinn Chétchathaig
- Dáire mac Cormaic, a son of the celebrated Cormac mac Airt
- Dáire mac Degad, father of the legendary Cú Roí and alternative ancestor of the Dáirine
- Dáire mac Dlúthaig, father of Fiatach Finn of the Ulaid, ancestor of the Dál Fiatach
- Dáire mac Fiachna, cattle-lord from the Ulster Cycle, owner of the Donn Cuailnge and cousin of Conchobar mac Nessa
- Dáire mac Forgo (Forggo), an early king of Emain Macha of the Ulaid and alternative father of Fiatach Finn
- Dáire of Ulster, a later king of Ulster during the reign of Lóegaire mac Néill, High King of Ireland, and allegedly visited by Saint Patrick

=== Modern era ===
- Daire Brehan (1957–2012), Irish actress, broadcaster and barrister
- Daire Doyle (born 1980), Irish assistant football manager and former player
- Daire Gray (born 1998), Irish hurler
- Daire Keogh (born 1964), Irish academic, historian and president of Dublin City University
- Daire Nolan (born 1968), Irish dancer and choreographer
- Daire O'Brien, Irish broadcaster and journalist
- Daire O'Connor (born 1997), Irish footballer
- Daire Plunkett (born 1990), Irish hurler
- Daire Quinn (fl. 2016–present), Irish hurler
- Daire Rendon (born 1952), American politician

== Interpretations ==
Both Eoin MacNeill and T. F. O'Rahilly believed that most, if not all of those listed may derive from the same prehistoric or mythological figure, or have adopted each other's features to such an extent as to all be composites. The latter states that Daire and Cú Roí "are ultimately one and the same", and refers to him as "the god of the Otherworld".

== Meaning and origins ==
The meaning is both sexual ("fruitful, fertile, rutty") and tumultuous ("violent"). The reconstructed form is *Dārios, cognate to the Gaulish Dari(o) ("tumult, rage"), a form widely attested on the Continent, especially in personal names.

The Darini were a population group or kingdom located by Ptolemy's 2nd century Geography in south Antrim and north Down. Julius Pokorny believed this to be a mistake for Darioni, from the ground form *Dārio-nion, reconstructed from the proto-historical Dairine, descendants of Daire Doimthech / Daire mac Dedad and ancestors of the historical Corcu Loígde. They were probably also ancestral, at least in part, to the Dál Fiatach, the descendants of Fiatach Finn mac Daire and known as the historical Ulaid (< *Uluti / Uoluntii), mentioned by Ptolemy living adjacent to the Darini.

== Lugaid ==
- See: Lugaid for additional persons

Closely associated with Daire in Irish legend is the heroic figure Lugaid. According to O'Rahilly he was the son of Dáire, Lugaid mac Dáire or Lugaid Loígde, son of Dáire Doimthech (or Sírchrechtach), but was chiefly remembered in the person of his 'descendant' Lugaid Mac Con. His other principal emanation was Lugaid mac Con Roí, son of Cú Roí and famously known from the Ulster Cycle. In addition, the revolting Lugaid Riab nDerg has been suggested as a relation to these, or alternatively a very different individual and King of Tara once known as Lugaid Réoderg.

== See also ==
- Darragh
- Deda mac Sin
- Dis Pater
- Iverni
- List of Irish-language given names
