= Dáire mac Dedad =

Dáire mac Dedad (Dáire, son of Dega) is the eponymous ancestor of the Dáirine of Munster and father of the legendary Cú Roí mac Dáire. These further associate him with the prehistoric Darini of Ulster. He is probably identical with Dáire Doimthech (Sírchrechtach), an ancestor of the Corcu Loígde. As such he is a common ancestor of several prominent dynasties of the so-called Érainn, including the Dál Fiatach of Ulster.

His brother, whom Dáire is said to have succeeded as King of Munster, was Íar mac Dedad, ancestor of Eterscél Mór, father of the legendary monarch Conaire Mór.

T. F. O'Rahilly did not see Dáire as distinct from his son, stating that "Cú Roí and Dáire are ultimately one and the same".

According to genealogical schemes deriving from the compilations and works of Duald Mac Firbis and others, Dáire's family can be reconstructed as follows:

- Dáire (mac Degad) m. Morand Manandach, sister of Eochaidh Eachbeoil of Scotland
  - Cú Roí
    - Lugaid mac Con Roí m. a daughter of Medb and Ailill mac Mata
    - Uidnia, a son from whom descend the Dál nUidne/nUidine
  - Cindit or Cindfhinn m. King of Pre-Osraige (Crimthann Mor)
    - Aegus Osraidi and the Kingdom of Osraige
  - Fingile, another daughter about whom some stories exist concerning Dáire's eventual demise
  - Conganchnes, sometimes written another son of Dáire as opposed to brother

== See also ==
- Dáire
