= Dáire Drechlethan =

Former Irish king at Tara in Mide

Dáire Drechlethan "Dáire of the Broad Face" is a king of Tara listed in the Old Irish Baile Chuinn Chétchathaig. His identity with any king of Tara from Irish legend remains uncertain because his epithet is unique in the surviving corpus related to Tara.

However, three candidates have recently been proposed, the most likely being Dáire Doimthech, a well known king of Tara from Irish legend. His kindred, the Dáirine or Corcu Loígde, believed to be related to the Érainn, provided a number of powerful kings of Tara in the early period, and this could not be ignored by the Uí Néill compilers of the list. A descendant (or ancestor) of Dáire Doimthech, Mac Con moccu Lugaid Loígde, is also listed in BCC. Dáire Doimthech is also called Dáire Sírchréchtach or Sírdréchtach often in the tales and genealogies, where he is prominent as an ancestral figure. On the other hand, he is regarded as an ancestor deity of the Érainn by scholars following the theories of T. F. O'Rahilly.

The alternative candidates are first Dáire mac Cormaic, a son of the famous Cormac mac Airt, an early ancestor of the Uí Néill. Nowhere mentioned in legend as a king of Tara, he is only proposed on the basis of BCC apparently exhibiting bias in favour of Dál Cuinn candidates.

The second is Dáire Barrach son of Cathair Mór, eponymous ancestor of the Uí Bairrche, a Laigin dynasty. Although also nowhere described as a king of Tara, it is also recognized that overlordship of the region in which it lays was won from the Laigin by the Uí Néill, and that a number of Laigin kings of Tara are probably missing from BCC. At the same time this anti-Laiginian bias may make Dáire Barrach the least likely candidate. On the other hand, his son Muiredach Sníthe and grandson Móenach are listed as kings of Tara in the Leinster regnal poem Nidu dír dermait. But see also Laidcenn mac Bairchid.

== See also ==
- Dáire
- List of High Kings of Ireland
