= Breifne O'Brien =

Irish fraudster

Breifne O'Brien is an Irish convicted swindler and former socialite businessman. A major figure in Ireland's Celtic Tiger economy, he has been called "Ireland's Bernie Madoff". His residences included a lavish family home in Glenageary, an apartment on Dalkey’s Vico Road and a golfing villa in Barbados. He drove an Aston Martin DB7 and had close to 100 bank accounts. After admitting in 2008 to his investors—many of whom were close friends—that he had stolen millions of Euros of their money to fund a lavish lifestyle and could not pay it back, he was investigated by the Garda Síochána Fraud Squad. It was reported that he referred to his investors as "suckers". His mother put up his bail to get him out of jail and he was put on trial for fraud. He pleaded guilty to a sample of charges brought against him involving sums totalling more than ten million euros. On 8 October 2014, O'Brien was sentenced to seven years in prison. O'Brien appealed the sentence; the Court of Appeal denied the appeal in December 2015. In July 2016, the High Court adjudicated O'Brien as bankrupt. O'Brien was released on parole from prison in May 2018, having served approximately half of his prison sentence; he will be returned to prison if he comes to the attention of authorities.

His family home is Carrigrohane Castle in County Cork, Ireland. His father Leo was a businessman and his younger brother is RTÉ rugby commentator Daire O'Brien. He was married to Fiona Nagle who divorced him after his fraud came to light, after which point, they had to give their beloved dog Will away to a loving Galway home. O’Brien and Will were renowned for hosting lavish parties at his home.
