= Síl Conairi =

- Parent house: Clanna Dedad / Érainn
- Country: Ireland, Scotland
- Founder: Conaire Mór
- Titles: Kings of Tara; High Kings of Ireland; Kings of Dál Riata; Kings of the Picts; Kings of Alba; Kings of Scotland; King of Munster

The Síl Conairi (Sil Chonairi, Conaire) or "Seed of Conaire" were those Érainn septs of the legendary Clanna Dedad descended from the monarch Conaire Mór, son of Eterscél Mór, a descendant of Deda mac Sin, namely the Dál Riata, Múscraige, Corcu Duibne, and Corcu Baiscinn.

The Dál Riata, presumably originating in far northeastern Ulster in the prehistoric period, would famously go on to contribute to the founding of the Kingdom of Alba or Scotland and be responsible for the Gaelicisation of that country. The most celebrated Royal Family of Scotland, the House of Dunkeld, described themselves as the "seed of Conaire Mór" as late as the twelfth century. Conaire Mór is thus an ancestor of the modern British royal family through the House of Dunkeld. According to tradition, the last king in the 'direct' male line from the Clanna Dedad and Síl Conairi was Alexander III of Scotland (d. 19 March 1286).

Although an earlier, prehistoric Gaelic presence in Scotland has long been noted by scholars, two early Kings of the Picts suggested to be from the Dál Riata, and who may have been instrumental in the (further) Gaelicisation of Pictland, were Bridei IV of the Picts and his brother Nechtan mac Der-Ilei.

The remaining Síl Conairi would settle and/or remain in Munster, where, although retaining their distinctive identity, they would be overshadowed at first by their Corcu Loígde / Dáirine kinsmen, but later reject them in favour of the Eóganachta and be instrumental in the rise to power of that dynasty. The Múscraige became the chief vassals and facilitators for the Eóganachta and their mesne king was regarded as more or less equal in status to the three or four regional kings under the Cashel overlordship. A late and unexpected king of Munster from the Múscraige was Flaithbertach mac Inmainén (d. 944).

The Corcu Duibne are renowned for their ogham inscriptions, with over one third of all Irish inscriptions found in their region. Both they and the Corcu Baiscinn were renowned as sailors. The latter were eventually absorbed into the Kingdom of Thomond under the O'Brien dynasty.

The birth, life, and fall of Conaire Mór are recounted in the epic tale Togail Bruidne Dá Derga. Two distantly related tales of more interest to genealogists are De Síl Chonairi Móir and De Maccaib Conaire. In these he is confused with his descendant or double Conaire Cóem, father of Na Trí Coirpri "The Three Cairbres", namely Coirpre Músc, a quo the Múscraige and Corcu Duibne, Coirpre Baschaín, a quo the Corcu Baiscinn, and Coirpre Rígfhota (Riata), a quo the Dál Riata.

== See also ==
- Senchus fer n-Alban
- Kings of Tara
