= Ivernian =

Ivernian may refer to:

- one of the Iverni
- Primitive Irish
- Ivernic language
