= Íar mac Dedad =

Íar mac Dedad (Íar, son of Deda mac Sin) was a legendary King of Munster. He is the great grandfather, or in some sources more distant ancestor, of Eterscél Mór, and grandfather (or great-grandfather) of the famous Conaire Mór, both High Kings of Ireland.

Íar may be the eponymous ancestor of the Érainn of Munster. Both the personal name and tribal name derive from the same root. Among his historical descendants, through the later High King Conaire Cóem, are the Dál Riata of Ulster and Scotland, and the Corcu Duibne, Múscraige, and Corcu Baiscind of Munster. These were known as the Síl Conairi, one of the principal royal septs of the Érainn.

The brother of Íar was Dáire mac Dedad, eponymous ancestor of the Dáirine. He succeeded Íar as king of Munster.
