= Dedu =

Dedu may refer to:

- Dedu County, former name of Wudalianchi City
- Deda mac Sin, also called Dedu, prehistoric king of Érainn
