= Gangani (Ireland) =

People of ancient Ireland

The Gangani (Γαγγανοι) were a people of ancient Ireland who are referred to in Ptolemy's 2nd-century Geography as living in the south-west of the island, probably near the mouth of the River Shannon, between the Auteini to the north and the Uellabori to the south.

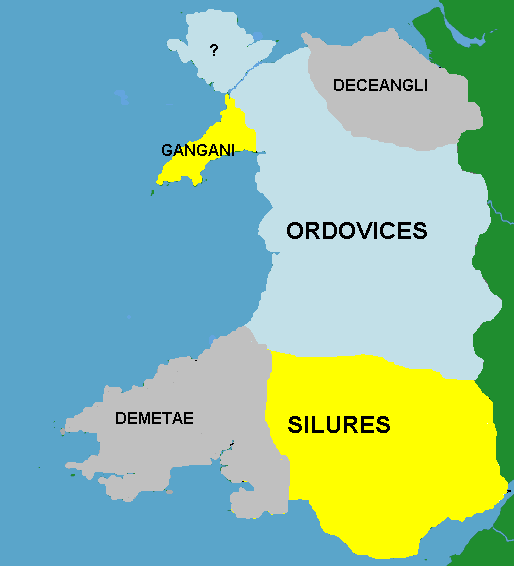
Tribes of Wales c. 40 before the Roman invasion.

There appears to have been a people of the same name in north-west Wales, as Ptolemy calls the Llŷn Peninsula the "promontory of the Gangani" (Γαγγανὤν ἄκρον). The Gangani (the name would seem to link to the modern Welsh cangen, "branch, bough") were a war-ready tribe and skilled seafarers who lived in hillforts. The most spectacular of these, Tre'r Ceiri, stood 450m above sea level on the slopes of Yr Eifl in Gwynedd.

== See also ==
- Conganchnes mac Dedad, a name of perhaps some relation. Cú Roí, Conganchnes' nephew, was based in Irish legend not far from the Gangani.
