= Dáirine =

Family

The Dáirine (Dáirinne, Dáirfine, Dáirfhine) were a people of early medieval Ireland, probably derived from or closely associated with the Darini of Ptolemy's 2nd century Geography. In historical times the Dáirine included the Corcu Loígde, the Uí Fidgenti and Uí Liatháin of Munster, as well as the Dál Fiatach of Ulster. The name Dáirine also sometimes referred to the Érainn.

== History ==
The Dáirine of Munster were said to descend from a certain Dáire (*Dārios), both Dáire Doimthech (Sírchrechtach), ancestor of the Corcu Loígde, and from Dáire mac Dedad, father of Cú Roí. The two are quite probably identical. The medieval genealogists were aware of the confusion and noted it in the Book of Glendalough (Rawlinson B 502). At some point the pedigree tradition of the Corcu Loígde diverged in its forms and ceased to closely match those more common elsewhere in Ireland. The Clanna Dedad take their name from Cú Roí's grandfather Dega, son of Sen (the Old).

Dáirine can sometimes refer to the Érainn dynasties as a whole instead of the distinct royal septs mentioned above. The Érainn were the proto-historical rulers of Munster before the rise of the Eóganachta in the 7th century AD.

According to T. F. O'Rahilly, the Dáirine were greatly renowned as a warlike military caste, in contrast to their agricultural and relatively peaceful successors. According to the mythical tale Táin Bó Flidais, the Clanna Dedad were one of the three warrior-races (laech-aicmi) of Ireland, the others being the Clanna Rudraige (their Ulaid cousins), and the Gamanrad of Irrus Domnann, who were related to the Laigin.

Among the known surviving septs of princely origins in Munster are O'Driscoll, O'Leary, Coffey, Hennessy and Flynn, all descendants of Lugaid Mac Con. In Ulster the Dál Fiatach septs are Haughey/Hoey and Donlevy/Dunleavy.

== Figures ==
Legendary figures belonging to the Dáirine, descendants (and family) of Dáire mac Dedad / Dáire Doimthech, include:

- Cú Roí mac Dáire
- Lugaid mac Con Roí
- Conganchnes mac Dedad
- Fiatach Finn
- Lugaid Loígde
- Rechtaid Rígderg
- Mac Con
- Fothad Cairpthech and Fothad Airgthech
- Eochaid Étgudach
- Óengus Bolg
- Aimend
- (Crimthann mac Fidaig)
- (Mongfind)

== In the Ulster Cycle ==
- Fled Bricrenn
- Mesca Ulad
- Táin Bó Cúailnge
- Táin Bó Flidhais

== Mac Con Cycle ==
- Cath Maige Mucrama
