= Ruaidrí mac Duinn Sléibe =

Gaelic King of Ulster (c. 1134–1201)

Ruaidrí mac Duinn Sléibe (Modern Irish: Ruairí mac Donnsliabh), anglicized as Rory MacDonlevy (c. 1134–1201), was a Dál Fiatach King of Ulaid of the MacDonlevy branch based in Downpatrick. He was the last native Gaelic King of Ulster (of old East Ulster). The son of powerful overking Cú Uladh mac Duinn Sléibe, in 1173, Ruaidrí succeeded his elder brother Donnsléibe as overking of Ulaid. In 1201, he was ultimately defeated by the Norman forces of Sir John de Courcy, who established the Earldom of Ulster.
