= Ballintaggart Ogham Stones =

Collection of ogham stones in County Kerry, Ireland

- Clocha Oghaim Bhaile an tSagairt (Irish)
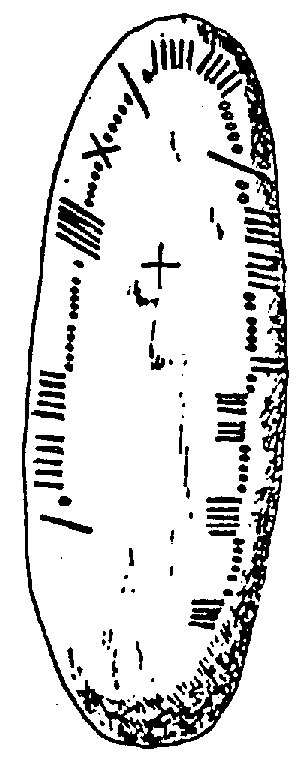
- CIIC 156, bearing the name of the Corcu Duibne

- Location within Ireland
- 52.127810°N 10.243167°W
- Type: ogham stones
- Location: Ballintaggart, Dingle, County Kerry, Ireland

History
- Built: AD 400–550

Site notes
- Elevation: 51 m (167 ft)
- Owner: private

National monument of Ireland
- Official name: Ballintaggart
- Reference no.: 64

Ballintaggart Ogham Stones is a collection of ogham stones forming a National Monument located in County Kerry, Ireland.

== Location ==
Ballintaggart Ogham Stones are located inside a round enclosure (diameter 30 m / 100 ft), immediately east of Dingle racecourse and southeast of the town.

== History ==
The stones were carved in the 5th and 6th centuries AD and served as burial markers.

This was anciently the site of a church and old burial ground (An Cheallúnach or An Lisín).

== Description ==
The ogham stones are rounded, made of water-rolled sandstone. Eight of them form a circle, each one lying down pointing outwards. The ninth lies at the centre. Several have been inscribed with crosses.

- CIIC 155: AKEVRITTI (presumably a personal name)
- CIIC 156: MAQQI-IARI KOỊ MA/QQI MU/CCOI DOVVINIAS (Here is Mac-Iair, son of the Corcu Duibne)
- CIIC 157: DOVETI MAQQI/ CATTI/NI (of Duibthe, son of Caitne). The language used here is primitive, lacking vowel affection, placing it around the time of Saint Patrick
- CIIC 158: SUVALLOS MAQ/Q̣Ị DU/COVAROS (of Suvallos son of Ducovaros)
- CIIC 159: ṂẠQI-DECC[E]DẠ/ ṂẠQ̣Ị/ GLASICONAS (of son of Deichet, son of Glasiconas). The personal name Glasiconas means "grey wolf."
- CIIC 160: TRIA MAQA MAILAGNI (of the three sons of Maílagnas) / CURCITTI (of Cuircthe). This stone bears a strange cross: with arms of equal length, two with "E" shapes on the end, one with a "Y" and one with a +
- CIIC 161: INISSIO/NAS (a personal name); like CIIC 157 it dates to the 5th century AD
- CIIC 162: CUṆẠMAQQ̣I/ AVI CỌRBBI (of Conmac, grandson of Corb)
- CIIC 163: N[E]TTA-LAMINACCA KO/I ṂA/QQI MỤCOI DOṾ[I]Ṇ[IA]Ṣ (here is Laminacca's champion, son of the Corcu Duibne)
