= Daire O'Brien =

Irish broadcaster and journalist

Daire O'Brien is an Irish broadcaster and journalist. He is best known for being the presenter and anchorman of RTÉ Sport's coverage of the Pro14 rugby union competition, and has been with RTÉ since 2010. Before this he presented for Setanta Sports, where he was one of their most recognisable faces. Here he was successful until Setanta Sports went bankrupt in 2010, after which he moved to RTE Sport and began broadcasting for them. He has also contributed to Newstalk. He has written for the Irish Independent, The Sunday Times, The Sunday Business Post and the Sunday Tribune and reported for Prime Time in the 1990s. He narrated the RTÉ series Tidiest of Towns in 2007.

O'Brien's family home is Carrigrohane Castle in Cork. His father, Leo, was a businessman. His older brother is the socialite businessman Breifne O'Brien, who was recently found guilty of defrauding a number of people, some of whom were longtime friends, of sums totaling more than €10m.
