= Cú Roí =

Legendary king of Munster, Ireland

Cú Roí mac Dáire (Cú Ruí, Cú Raoi) is a king of Munster in the Ulster Cycle of Irish mythology. He is usually portrayed as a warrior with superhuman abilities and a master of disguise possessed of magical powers. His name probably means "hound of the plain/field", or more specifically, "hound of the battlefield". He is the son of Dáire mac Dedad (or Dáire Doimthech), and thus belongs to the Clanna Dedad. However, T. F. O'Rahilly believed this to be artificial, stating that "Cú Roí and Dáire are ultimately one and the same".

Though often an outsider figure, for instance in the role of intervener or arbitrator, Cú Roí appears in a great number of medieval Irish texts, including Forfess Fer Fálgae, Amra Con Roi, Brinna Ferchertne, Aided Chon Roi, Fled Bricrenn, Mesca Ulad and Táin Bó Cúailnge. The early Irish tale-lists refer to such titles as Aided Chon Roí, Echtra Chon Roí (List A), Orgain Chathrach Chon Roí and Cathbúada Con Roí (List B), but only the first of these tales can be shown to have survived in some form. Several tales describe the enmity between him and the Ulster hero Cú Chulainn, who eventually kills him.

== Fled Bricrenn ==
Cú Roí plays an important role in the 8th-century tale Fled Bricrenn (Bricriu's Feast). The trickster Bricriu incites the heroes Cú Chulainn, Conall Cernach and Lóegaire Búadach to compete for the champion's portion at a feast, and Cú Roí is one of those who judged among them. Like all the other judges, he chooses Cú Chulainn, but Conall and Lóegaire refuse to accept his verdict. When the three heroes return to Ulster, Cú Roí appears to each in the guise of a hideous churl (bachlach) and challenges them to behead him, then allow him to return and behead them. Only Cú Chulainn is brave and honourable enough to submit himself to the churl's axe, so he is declared champion. This story is related to the "beheading game" motif appearing in many later works in Arthurian literature - most famously the 14th-century English poem Sir Gawain and the Green Knight, although closer correspondences are to be found in Diu Crône and La Mule sans frein, both of which feature a revolving fortress like Cu Roi's.

== Táin bó Cúailnge ==
=== Combat of Munremar and Cú Roí ===
Cú Roí appears in the side-tale "Comlond Munremair & Con Roi" ("The combat of Munremar and Cú Roí") included in Recension I of Táin bó Cúailnge. Cú Roí, who has sent a contingent to the Connacht army but had not hitherto been personally involved in the recent hostilities between Ulster and Connacht, does intervene when he learns that the Ulster warrior Munremar mac Gerrginn (lit. "Fatneck son of Shorthead") has come to assist Cú Chulainn in fighting the Connacht army. Since he believes no warrior in the army was able to withstand Munremar, he chooses to rally to the support of "his people" (muinter). The resulting encounter (comlond) between the two warriors is a spectacular stone-throwing contest, described from the perspective of the Connacht troops, who witness many stones flying in opposite directions from the east and west (Cotal and Ard Róich) and colliding right above their heads. The shower of falling rubble forces them to use their shields for protection, until on their request, Cú Roí and Munremar agree to discontinue the fight and return home. The plain strewn with stones is afterwards called Mag Clochair ("The Stony Plain").

=== The Trance of Amairgin ===
Cú Roí further appears in the episode known as "The Trance of Amairgin", variants of which appear in Recension I and II of the Táin bó Cúailnge.

The episode appears as Aislinge n-Aimirgin ("The trance of Amairgin") in Recension I of the Táin. Having followed news of Cú Chulainn's sustained success in single-handedly opposing the Connacht army, Cú Roí once again appears on the scene, this time to fight Cú Chulainn directly. However, on finding Cú Chulainn weak from the injuries which Ferdiad had recently inflicted on him, he refused to carry out his original plan. Instead he faces the giant warrior poet Amairgin, who in a trance is hurling stones at the Connacht army in Tailtiu, with devastating effects. Cú Roí attacks him in kind and their stones meet in the air. They pause when on Cú Roí's request, Amairgen allows the cattle to go past Tailtiu, but seeing as the passage had become difficult, Cú Roí agrees to withdraw from the contest altogether.

The episode in the Book of Leinster (Recension II), called Imthúsa Chon Ruí meic Dáire (header) or Oislige Amargin (text), offers by and large the same story, but adds more explicit detail, notably on the point of Cú Roí's sense of honour in his encounters with Cú Chulainn and Amairgin. First, Cú Roí explains his refusal to fight Cú Chulainn not only by pointing out the inequality between a physically healthy and an injured warrior, but also by saying that a victory would not be his, seeing as it was Fer Diad who had laid low his opponent. Second, the conclusion of Cú Roí's fight with Amairgin is told from a perspective which highlights the role of honour in his motives. Medb insisted "[b]y the truth of your [Cú Roí's] valour" ([a]r fír do gascid fritt) that he should abandon the competition, obstructive as it proved to be to the progress of the expedition. Cú Roí, however, was determined to persist "till the day of doom" (co brunni brátha) unless Amairgin agreed to stop. (When the matter was settled and Cú Roí returned to his country, Amairgin resumed his attacks on the invading army, explaining that his agreement was with Cú Roí only.)

== Death tale and fragments ==
Cú Roí's death by Cú Chulainn's hand is the subject of the tale Aided Con Roi, which survives in two versions. A number of tales describe enmity between the two warriors, and some allude to a lost story of its origin. Texts such as Forfess Fer Fálgae and Siaburcharpát Con Culainn describe a raid on Inis Fer Falga (possibly the Isle of Man) in which Cú Roí and Cú Chulainn come into conflict. The texts indicate that two were involved in an Ulster raid on the Fir Falgae, with Cú Roí participating again in disguise. They steal treasure and abduct Bláthnat, daughter of the king of the island, who loves Cú Chulainn. But when Cú Roí is asked to choose his share, he chooses Bláthnat. Cú Chulainn tries to stop him taking her, but Cú Roí drives him into the ground up to his armpits, cuts off his hair and, according to the Aided Conrói Mac Dáiri, rubbed cow dung onto his head before escaping, taking Bláthnat with him.

=== Aided Con Roí ===
Later, Bláthnat (Blanaid) betrays Cú Roí to Cú Chulainn, who besieges his fort and killed him. In one version of the story, Cú Roí's soul was hidden in an apple in the belly of a salmon which lived in a stream in the Slieve Mish Mountains, and only surfaced once every seven years; Bláthnat discovered the secret and told Cú Chulainn, who killed the fish, enabling him to kill Cú Roí. However Ferchertne, Cú Roí's poet, enraged at the betrayal of his lord, grabbed Bláthnat and leaped off a cliff, killing her and himself.

Cú Roí's uncle (or brother or nephew), Conganchnes ("Horn-skinned"), tried to avenge him, but was killed by Celtchar. His son, Lugaid mac Con Roí, later succeeds in avenging him by killing Cú Chulainn, a story told in Aided Con Culainn. Lugaid is himself killed by Conall Cernach.

In another version Cú Roí takes Bláthnat to the fort and keeps her captive there. Bláthnat communicates with Cú Chulainn and a plan is hatched. Taking an opportunity when most of Cú Roí's men are absent from the fort, Bláthnat gives the signal to Cú Chulainn by pouring milk into the Fionnghlaise (white stream - now the Derrymore River). Cú Chulainn, on seeing the stream become white, storms the fort, kills Cú Roí, and carries off Bláthnat. As Cú Roí's men return up the valley, Bláthnat places a spell which makes the valley walls dance in front of the men's eyes. Walkers who ascend Caherconree via the Derrymore River valley can still see this effect which is caused by an optical illusion.

== Clanna Dedad ==
According to the genealogical schemes, Cú Roí is cousin to the famous monarch Conaire Mór, son of Eterscél, son of Íar mac Dedad, brother of Cú Roí's father Dáire mac Dedad. All belong to the Clanna Dedad, a leading dynasty of the Érainn.

== Caherconree ==
The Iron Age ruin of Caherconree (Irish Cathair Con Raoi, Cú Roí's castle) in the Slieve Mish Mountains, on the Dingle Peninsula or Corcu Duibne, County Kerry, preserves Cú Roí's name.

== Cú Roí in Welsh literature ==
Cú Roí's name also appears in two examples of medieval Welsh literature. First, it occurs in the corrupt form Cubert m. Daere in the Middle Welsh tale Culhwch ac Olwen, along with the names of other characters of the Ulster Cycle – Conchobor, Fergus, Conall Cernach and Lóegaire Búadach. Here the Irish heroes form one group out of a long list of King Arthur's warriors whose names Culhwch invokes as his sureties when he demands entry to King Arthur's court. Second, an elegy (marwnat) for Corroi/Corroy m[ab] Dayry is preserved in the Book of Taliesin, which mentions his contention with "Cocholyn", or Cú Chulainn.

== Primary sources ==
- Amra Con Roí
  - Henry, P.L. (ed. and tr.). "Amra Con Roi (ACR): discussion, edition, translation." Études Celtiques 31 (1995): 179-94: 186-94.
  - Stokes, Whitley. "The Eulogy of Cúrói (Amra Chonroí)." Ériu 2 (1905): 1-4.
- Táin bó Cúailnge (Recension I), ed. and tr. Cecily O'Rahilly, Táin Bó Cúalnge Recension 1. Dublin: DIAS, 1976. Text and translation available from CELT.
- Táin bó Cúailnge (Recension II, Book of Leinster), ed. and tr. ed. and tr. Cecily O'Rahilly, Táin Bó Cúalnge from the Book of Leinster. Dublin: DIAS, 1967 (reprinted: 1970). Text and translation available from CELT.
- Culhwch ac Olwen, ed. Rachel Bromwich and D. Simon Evans, Culhwch and Olwen: An Edition and Study of the Oldest Arthurian Tale. University of Wales Press, 1992. ISBN 0-7083-1127-X.
- The tragic death of Cúrói mac Dári. Edited and translated by Irish scholar Richard Irvine Best. In Ériu, II (1905), pp. 18–35.
- Brinna Fercherne. Translated by Kuno Meyer. In Zeitschrift für celtische Philologie, Volume III (1901).
