= Deda mac Sin =

Also called Dedu, prehistoric king of Érainn

- Issue: Íar mac Dedad and Dáire mac Dedad, Conganchnes and Conall Anglonnach
Era dates
- 1st century BC
- House: Clanna Dedad
- Father: Sen

Deda mac Sin (Deda, son of Sen) was a prehistoric king of the Érainn of Ireland, possibly of the 1st century BC. Variant forms or spellings include Ded, Dedu, Dedad, Degad, Dega, Dego, Deguth and Daig, with some of these occurring as genitives although usage is entirely unsystematic, besides the rare occurrence of the obvious genitive Dedaid.

He is the eponymous ancestor of the Clanna Dedad, and may also have been a King of Munster.

Through his sons Íar mac Dedad and Dáire mac Dedad, Dedu is an ancestor of many famous figures from legendary Ireland, including his "grandsons" (giving or taking a generation) Cú Roí mac Dáire and Eterscél, "great-grandsons" (again) Conaire Mór and Lugaid mac Con Roí, and more distant descendant Conaire Cóem. A third son was Conganchnes mac Dedad.

Through these, Dedu is also an ancestor of several historical peoples of both Ireland and Scotland, including the Dál Riata, Dal Fiatach, Múscraige, Corcu Duibne, and Corcu Baiscind, all said to belong to the Érainn (Iverni), of whom the Clanna Dedad appear to have been a principal royal sept.

The generations preceding Dedu mac Sin in the extant pedigrees appear artificial. Eventually they lead through Ailill Érann to a descent from Óengus Tuirmech Temrach and thus a distant kinship with the Connachta and Uí Néill, whose own pedigree is in fact unreliable before Túathal Techtmar.

A proto-historical sept of the Clanna Dedad are known as the Dáirine, descending from Dáire mac Dedad and/or Dáire Doimthech (Sírchrechtach), and are later known as the Corcu Loígde. Alternatively this may be used synonymously, with some confusion created by their identification with the Darini of prehistoric Ulster. In any case, the Darini and Iverni are clearly related.

According to the Book of Glendalough (Rawlinson B 502) and Laud 610 pedigrees, a brother of Dedu was Eochaid/Echdach mac Sin, from whom descend the Dál Fiatach of Ulster. But alternatively they descend directly from Cú Roí mac Dáire, and thus from the Clanna Dedad proper. The precise relation of the Dál Fiatach to the Ulaid of the Ulster Cycle, rivals of the Clanna Dedad, is lost to history.

Eoin MacNeill finds the Conaille Muirtheimne to also descend from Dedu mac Sin, from another son Conall Anglonnach, believing they are quite mistakenly thought to be Cruthin, as found in later genealogies.

Dui Dallta Dedad was a foster-son of Dedu.

There is also an Ogham of Dedu (Ogam Dedad) found in the Book of Ogams. Over one third of all Irish ogham inscriptions are found in the lands of his descendants the Corcu Duibne.

== The Sil Conairi ==
The Síl Conairi were those septs of the Clanna Dedad descended from Conaire Mór, namely the Dál Riata, Múscraige, Corcu Duibne, and Corcu Baiscinn. The first, presumably settling in far northeastern Ulster in the prehistoric period, would famously go on to found the Kingdom of Scotland. The Royal Family of Scotland, the House of Dunkeld, were described as the "seed of Conaire Mór" as late as the twelfth century. Through the House of Dunkeld and Conaire Mór, Dedu mac Sin is an ancestor of the modern British royal family. The last king in the direct male line from the Clanna Dedad and Sil Conairi was Alexander III of Scotland (d. 19 March 1286).

The remaining Síl Conaire would settle and/or remain in Munster, where, although retaining their distinctive identity, they would be overshadowed first by their Dáirine (Corcu Loígde) kinsmen, and later fall under the sovereignty of the Eóganachta. But it appears the Síl Conaire, and especially the Múscraige, actually acted as prominent facilitators for the latter, and this would presumably have been in opposition to the Dáirine. A late and unexpected king of Munster from the Múscraige was Flaithbertach mac Inmainén (d. 944).

The birth, life, and fall of Conaire Mór are recounted in the epic tale Togail Bruidne Dá Derga. Two distantly related tales of more interest to genealogists are De Síl Chonairi Móir and De Maccaib Conaire. In these he is confused with his descendant Conaire Cóem.

== The Dál Fiatach and Cú Roí ==
The descent of the Dál Fiatach princes of Ulster from Dedu mac Sin is less secure, but nonetheless is supported by independent medieval sources (and contradicted by others).

== The Dáirine (Corcu Loígde) ==
As early as 1849, the great Irish scholar John O'Donovan noted that the pedigree of the Corcu Loígde, the leading historical descendants of the Dáirine, is corrupt for many of the generations preceding the legendary monarch Lugaid Mac Con.

== Descent of the Clanna Dedad ==
Skipped generations are given in the notes.

- Sen mac Rosin
  - Dedu mac Sin a quo Clanna Dedad
    - Íar mac Dedad
      - Ailill Anglonnach
        - Éogan
          - Eterscél
            - Conaire Mór a quo Síl Conaire
              - Mug Láma
                - Conaire Cóem
                  - Eochaid (Cairpre) Riata (Rigfhota), a quo
                    - Dál Riata
                      - Erc of Dalriada
                        - Fergus Mór
                          - Domangart Réti
                            - Gabrán mac Domangairt, a quo
                              - Cenél nGabráin
                                - House of Alpin
                                - House of Dunkeld
                            - Comgall mac Domangairt, a quo
                              - Cenél Comgaill
                        - Loarn mac Eirc, a quo
                          - Cenél Loairn
                            - House of Moray
                              - Mormaers of Moray
                        - Óengus Mór mac Eirc, a quo
                          - Cenél nÓengusa
                  - Cairpre Músc, a quo
                    - Múscraige
                    - Corc Duibne, a quo
                      - Corcu Duibne
                  - Cairpre Baschaín, a quo
                    - Corcu Baiscind
    - Dáire mac Dedad / Dairi Sirchrechtaig / Dáire Doimthech
      - Cú Roí mac Dáire
        - Lugaid mac Con Roí
        - Fuirme mac Con Roí
          - (F)Iatach Find, a quo
            - Dál Fiatach
      - Dáirine
        - Corcu Loígde
    - Conganchnes mac Dedad
    - Conall Anglonnach mac Dedad, a quo
      - Conaille Muirtheimne
  - Eochaid (Echdach/Echach) mac Sin
    - Deitsin/Deitsini
      - Dlúthaich/Dluthaig
        - Dáire/Dairi
          - Fir furmi
            - Fiatach Finn / Fiachach Fir Umai
              - Dál Fiatach
