= Múscraige =

People of Munster, Ireland

The Múscraighe (older spelling: Músgraige) were an important Érainn people of Munster, descending from Cairpre Músc, son of Conaire Cóem, a High King of Ireland. Closely related were the Corcu Duibne, Corcu Baiscind, both of Munster, and also the Dál Riata of Ulster and Scotland, all being referred to as the Síl Conairi in Irish and Scottish legends. A more distant ancestor was the legendary monarch Conaire Mór, son of Eterscél, son of Íar, son of Dedu mac Sin.

While the Múscraige petty kingdoms were scattered throughout the province of Munster, the largest were centred on the present baronies of Muskerry (West and East) in central County Cork. The tribes or septs were pre-Eóganachta, that is before the 6th century. At this time, the territory of Múscraige Mittaine did not extend south of the River Lee (although the river bisects the current baronies). A pedigree of the chieftains of the tribe may be found in the Book of Leinster. The main septs were:

Irish name of the túath	Equivalent barony	County
Múscraige Tíre	Ormond Lower and Owney and Arra	County Tipperary
Múscraige Breógain	Clanwilliam	County Tipperary
Múscraige Tri Maighe	Orrery and Kilmore and part of the barony of Duhallow	County Cork
Múscraige Mittaine	Muskerry East, Muskerry West and Barretts	County Cork
Múscraige Aodha (alias Múscraige Luachra)	Various baronies	Counties Cork, Tipperary and Limerick

Importantly, they acted as vassals and facilitators for the rising Eóganachta.

A King of Munster from the Múscraige was Flaithbertach mac Inmainén.
