= Eblani =

Early Irish population group

The Eblani (Ἐβλάνοι) or Eblanii (Ἐβλάνιοι) (manuscript variants: Ebdani [ Ἐβδανοί]; Blani [Βλάνοι]; Blanii [Βλάνιοι]) were a people of ancient Ireland uniquely recorded in Ptolemy's 2nd-century Geography, in which they inhabit a region on the east coast, roughly north of County Dublin. Ptolemy also lists a "city" called Eblana ( Ἔβλανα), which he locates between the estuaries of the rivers Buvinda (Βουουίνδα) and Oboca (᾿Οβόκα), implying a coastal site between the Boyne and probably the Liffey respectively. O'Rahilly tentatively suggested that the tribal name, which he speculatively reconstructed as *Ebodanī, may have survived in the toponym Edmann, a region on the east coast, probably in County Louth, occasionally mentioned in early texts. O'Rahilly's line of reasoning was inspired by the form Ebdanoi [ Ἐβδανοί] found in one manuscript family of Ptolemy's work, but this variant is demonstrably the result of a transcriptional error for Eblanoi ( Ἐβλάνοι) in a majuscule script, where Λ has been misread as Δ, and not vice versa as O'Rahilly reasoned. The associated settlement of the Eblani is spelled Eblana in all surviving manuscripts, with only minor accentual differences. This strongly suggests that Eblanoi [Ἐβλάνοι] was Ptolemy's original version, and Ebdanoi [Ἐβδανοί] the error. This defective reading cannot therefore be cited in support of his hypothesis.

Local historian Brendan Mathews has more recently suggested a link with the passage grave system at the mouth of the Delvin river, originally of at least eight tombs, which would have been a prominent landscape feature and established harbour in Ptolemy's day. The linguistic shift from Eblana to Delvin (Irish Albhain) seems far more likely.
