= Corcu Baiscind =

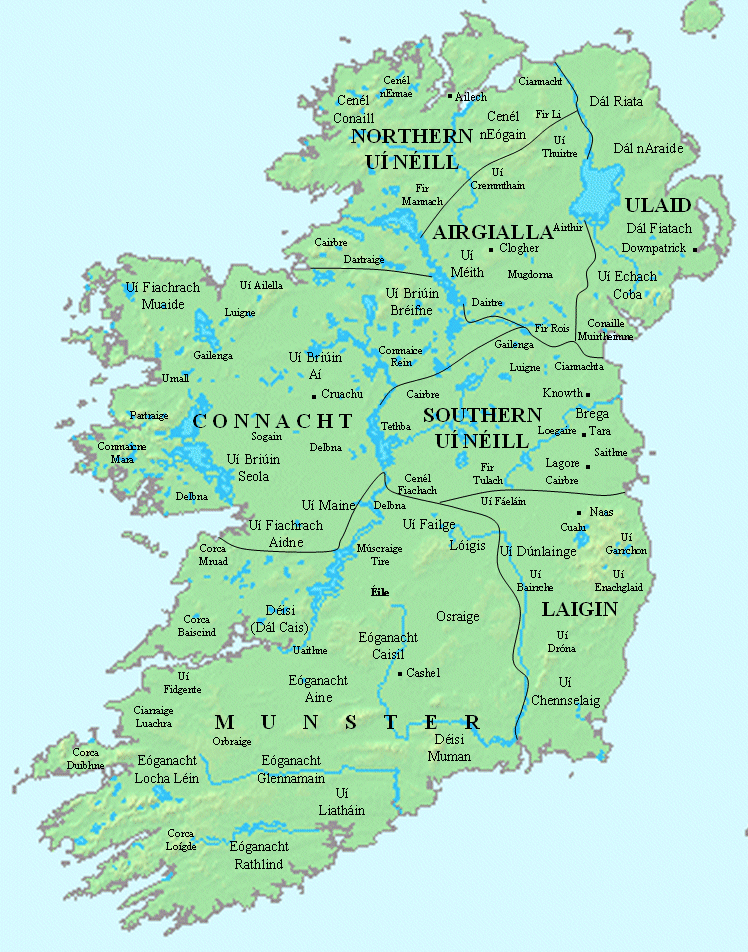
Map of Ireland with tribes and petty kingdoms, AD 800; the Corcu Baiscind are circled.

The Corcu Baiscind were an early Érainn people or kingdom of what is now southern County Clare in Munster. They descended from Cairpre Baschaín, son of Conaire Cóem, a High King of Ireland. Closely related were the Múscraige and Corcu Duibne, both of Munster, and also the Dál Riata of Ulster and Scotland, all belonging to the Síl Conairi of legend. A more distant ancestor was the legendary monarch Conaire Mór, son of Eterscél, son of Íar, son of Dedu mac Sin.

Corcu Baiscind was eventually absorbed into the Kingdom of Thomond under the Dál gCais.

Among their septs were O'Baskin, MacDermot and O'Donnell/MacDonnell. The MacMahon family of the Dál gCais, after their conquest of the area became Lords of Corcu Baiscind.

== Annalistic references ==
See Annals of Inisfallen (AI)

- 717. A battle was fought between the Connaughtmen and the Corca Baiscinn, wherein the son of Talamhnaigh was slain.
- AI723.2 Death of Aithechda son of Talamnach, king of Corcu Bascinn.
- AI725.1 Kl. Death of Flann son of Aithechda, king of Corcu Bascinn.
- AI774.4 Death of Cenn Faelad, king of Uí Fhidgeinte, and of Rechtabra, king of Corcu Bascinn.
- AI788.4 Death of Torpaid son of Aithechda, king of Corcu Bascinn.
- Annal AI812 Kl. The foundation of Dísert Diarmata; [Diarmait], son of Aed Rón, king of Corcu Bascinn.
- AI853.3 Death of Talamnach son of Aed, king of Corcu Bascinn.
- AI864.1 Kl. Death of Cermait son of Cathrannach, king of Corcu Bascinn.
- AI898.1 Kl. Death of Flann son of Cathrannach, king of Corcu Bascinn.
- AI920.2 The slaying of Murchad son of Flann, king of Corcu Bascinn.
- AI989.4 Congal son of Anrudán, king of Corcu Duibne, dies.
- AI992.4 Death of Dúnadach son of Diarmait, king of Corcu Bascinn.
- AI1014.2 The foreigners of Áth Cliath gave battle to Brian, son of Cennétig, and he was slain, with...Domnall son of Diarmait, king of Corcu Bascinn
- AI1029.7 Death of the son of Cathgus, king of Corcu Bascinn.
- AI1030.8 Lorcán Ua Briain's ship was sunk, and three royal heirs of Corcu Bascinn (drowned)
- AI1040.3 Death of Gilla Meic Oíbleáin Ua Congaile, king of Corcu Duibne.
- AI1049.3 Assid son of Domnall, king of Corcu Bascinn, was slain.
- AI1054.3 Three sons of Donnchadh, son of Brian, took a great prey in Corcu Modruad, both cows and booty.
- AI1055.3 Murchad Ua Briain was attacked in Corcu Modruad, and Tairdelbach inflicted a great slaughter upon him. Two kings of Corcu Baiscinn, namely, the grandson of Bascenn and the son of Assíd son of Domnall, with other nobles, were slain therein.
