= Mesca Ulad =

Early Irish text of the Ulster Cycle of tales

Mesca Ulad (English: The Intoxication of the Ulaid; the Ulstermen) is a narrative from the Ulster Cycle preserved in the 12th century manuscripts the Book of Leinster and in the Lebor na hUidre. The title Mesca Ulad occurs only in the Book of Leinster version. The story is set during Samhain, and follows the Ulaid as they attempt to attend two feasts in the same night: the first at Dún Dá Bhenn (modern day County Londonderry) to the north, and the second at Cúchulainn's fortress in Dún Delgan (modern Dundalk, Co. Louth) to the east. The men become intoxicated at the first feast and head south towards Kerry by accident. In Kerry, they are shown false hospitality by their traditional enemies the Munstermen, who offer them a place to stay. The Ulaid accept, and the Munstermen light a bonfire beneath the wood and iron structure. The Ulaids survive.

== Manuscript sources ==
- Book of Leinster (LL): p 261b-268b (RIA). Second part missing. Middle Irish version.
- Lebor na hUidre (LU): p 19a-20b (TCD). First part missing. Old Irish version.
- G4 or Yellow Book of Lecan (YBL): col. 959-972 (National Library of Ireland).
- Ed. XL or Adv. 72.1.40: p 49-68 (National Library of Scotland, Edinburgh)

== Editions and translations ==
- Hennessy, William M. (ed. and tr.). Mesca Ulad: or, the Intoxication of the Ultonians. Todd Lecture Series 1. Dublin, 1889. Based on LU and LL. The translation is reprinted in: Eleanor Hull (ed.), The Cu Chullin Saga in Irish literature. London, 1898; and in Ancient Irish tales, ed. T.P. Cross and C.H. Slover. New York, 1936. 215–38.
- Watson, J. Carmichael (ed.). Mesca Ulad. Mediaeval and Modern Irish Series 13. Dublin, 1941 (reprinted in 1983). Based on LU and LL, with variants from YBL and Ed. XL. Edition available from CELT.
- Mac Gearailt, Uaitéar (ed.). "The Edinburgh Text of Mesca Ulad." Ériu 37 (1986): 133–80. Based on Ed. XL.
- Watson, J. Carmichael (tr.). "Mesca Ulad". Scottish Gaelic Studies 5 (1938): 1-34 (LL, LU text). (English)
- Koch, John T. (tr.). In The Celtic Heroic Age, ed. John T. Koch and John Carey. 3d ed. Andover, 2000. 106–27. Provisional translation based on Watson's edition.
- Gantz, Jeffrey (tr.). "The Intoxication of the Ulaid." In: Early Irish Myths and Sagas. Harmondsworth, 1981. 188–217. (English)
- Guyonvarc'h, C.-J.( tr.). "L'ivresse des Ulates." Ogam 12 (1960): 487-506; 13 (1961): 343-60 [also in Celticum 2 (1962) 1-38] (French).

== Secondary literature ==
- Carey, John. "Vernacular Irish Learning: Three Notes." Éigse 24 (1990): 37–44.
- de Paor, Áine. "The common authorship of some Book of Leinster texts [III. Mesca Ulad]." Ériu 9 (1923): 118–46.
- Ó Concheanainn, Tomás. "The manuscript tradition of Mesca Ulad." Celtica 19 (1987): 13–30.
- Sayers, William. "Three charioteering gifts in Táin Bó Cúailnge and Mesca Ulad: immorchor deland, foscul díriuch, léim dar boilg." Ériu 32 (1981): 163–7.
- Sayers, William. "Portraits of the Ulster Hero Conall Cernach: A Case for Waardenburg's Syndrome?" Emania 20 (2006): 75–80.
- Thurneysen, Rudolf. Zu irischen Handschriften und Litteraturdenkmälern. Zweite Serie. Abhandlungen der königlichen Gesellschaft der Wissenschaften zu Göttingen 14.3. Berlin, 1913. See no. 17 for Mesca Ulad.
- Watson, J. Carmichael. "Mesca Ulad: the redactor's contribution to the later version." Ériu 13 (1940): 95-112.
