= Carrigrohane Castle =

Castle in County Cork, Ireland

Coordinates: 51.8964°N 8.56°W

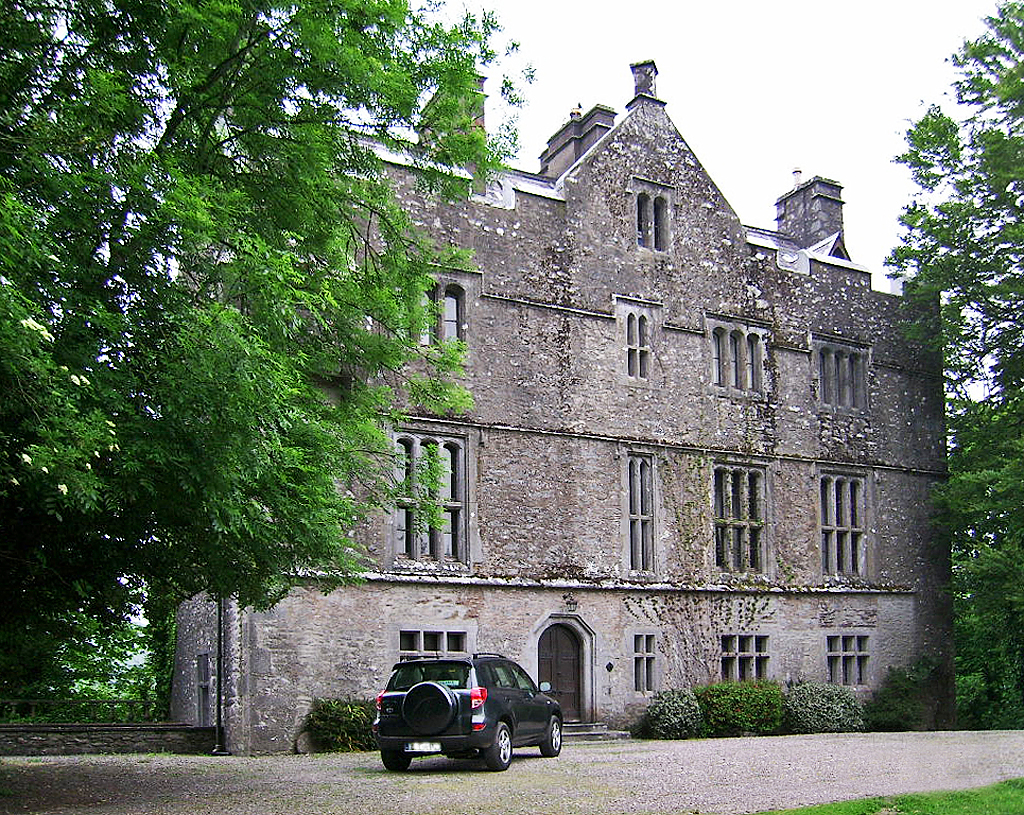
Carrigrohane Castle in 2016

Carrigrohane Castle is located in the village of Carrigrohane, barony of Barretts in County Cork, Ireland. It is situated on a rocky cliff-edge which overlooks the River Lee.

== History ==
The castle's original construction is attributed to the MacCarthy family. The castle became dilapidated in 1641 during the Irish Confederate Wars. It was repaired thereafter and became the residence of the rapparee, Captain Cape, and his bandits, who waylaid travellers, and plundered the surrounding countryside.

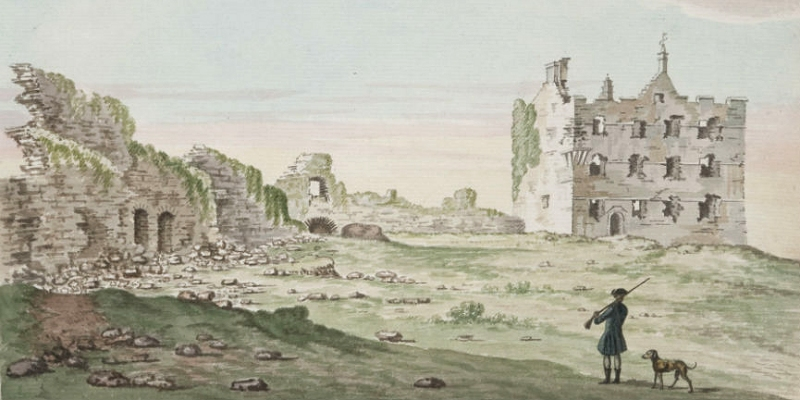
Gabriel Beranger's 18th century watercolour of a largely ruined Carrigrohane Castle. It was restored in the mid-19th century.

By the late 18th century it had fallen into ruin, and a mid-19th century description of the castle describes it as consisting of "two structures differentiated by age, altitude, bulk, and architecture - the larger and older of which is oblong, and three-storied". The castle was restored in the mid-19th century, reputedly by Thomas Newenham Deane and Benjamin Woodward. Additional renovation works were undertaken in the 20th century, and the castle used as a family home from the late 20th century.

== Geography ==
A cave at the base of the rock on which the ruin stands is believed by local residents to communicate with the Ovens caverns, 4 miles (6.4 km) away. A deep pool, called Hell's-Hole, overhung by limestone cliffs, and situated at a river bend above the castle site is imagined to be haunted by a "monstrous biped, having a mane like a horse, and a body like an eel".

== See also ==
- List of castles in the Republic of Ireland

== Sources ==
- Fullarton (1846). The Parliamentary gazetteer of Ireland: adapted to the new poor-law, franchise, municipal and ecclesiastical arrangements, and compiled with a special reference to the lines of railroad and canal communication, as existing in 1814-45. Vol. 1 (Public domain ed.). A. Fullarton and co. p. 338.
