= Erdini =

Ancient Irish people

The Erdini (Έρδινοι) or Erpeditani (Έρπεδιτανοι) were a people referred to in Ptolemy's 2nd century Geography as living in the north-west of Ireland, in the area of Donegal Bay.
