= Conganchnes mac Dedad =

Conganchnes ("the horny-skin" in Irish) is a hero mentioned in the legend of the death of Celtchar mac Uthechair; he does not, however, kill him, but is killed himself. Conganchnes is a son of Dedu mac Sin or sometimes Cú Roí.

He went to Ulster to avenge the death of his nephew Cú Roí mac Dáire mac Dedad and wrought much destruction upon the land on his way, being invincible due to his tough skin "as of horn" deflecting spears and swords. Conchobar asked Celtchar to get rid of the mighty Conganchnes, and Celtchar agreed.

He sent his own daughter to him, Níab, to gain his trust, and offered him "feasts for a hundred men every afternoon."

Níab asked her new husband how he could be killed; Conganchnes replied that red-hot spits must be stuck into his soles and thrust up into his shins. Níab relayed this information to her father, and told him to prepare a sleeping spell and a large army as well.

The instructions were followed to the letter, the men sneaking up on Conganchnes while he was under the sleeping spell. The spits were rammed into his soles and right into the marrow of the shins, and Conganchnes died. Celtchar then decapitated him; over his head rose a cairn, every man who passed it adding a stone.

== See also ==
- Gangani, a people mentioned by Ptolemy
