= Iverni =

People of early Ireland

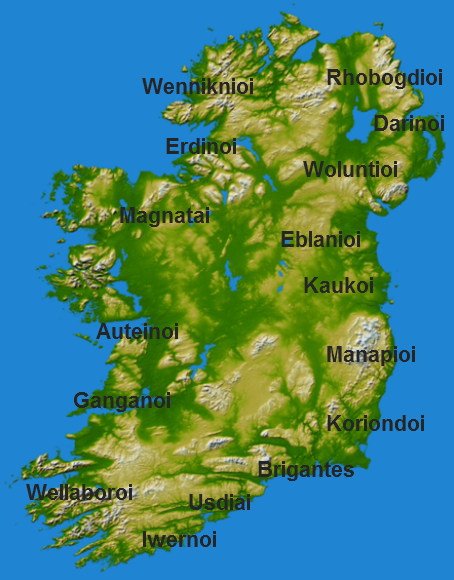
The Iverni ("Iwernoi" above) are one of the population groups mentioned in Ptolemy's Geography.

The Iverni (Ἰούερνοι, Iouernoi) were a people of early Ireland, first mentioned in Ptolemy's 2nd century Geography as living in the far south-west of the island. He also names a "city" called Ivernis (Ἰουερνίς, Iouernis) in their territory, and observes that this settlement has the same name as the island as a whole, Ivernia (Ἰουερνία, Iouernia). These Iverni are identified with the Érainn (Érnai, Érna), a people attested in Munster and elsewhere in the early Middle Ages. They included the Corcu Loígde, Corcu Duibne, Corcu Baiscind, Múscraige and Déisi, as well as the Dál Fiatach and Dál Riata. Their royal dynasties are sometimes referred to as the Dáirine.

== Name ==
The name has been derived from Archaic Irish *Īwernī meaning "folk of *Īweriū " (the island of Ireland). This is in turn derived from Proto-Celtic *Φīwerjon- and further from Proto-Indo-European *piHwerjon- (the full, fat, fertile land) – cognate with the Ancient Greek píeira and Sanskrit pīvara, which refer to fertile land.

John T. Koch says it was probably once the name given to all the peoples of Ireland, but by the early 1st millennium AD had a more restricted usage.

Pomponius Mela and Juvenal, writing in the 1st century AD, call Ireland Iuverna. In his 2nd century Geographia (c. 150 AD), Ptolemy called the island Iouernia or Iwernia (Ἰουερνία; ou represented /w/) and named a tribal group called the Iouernoi or Iwernoi (Ἰούερνοι) in the southwest.

The people of Ireland are called the Hiberni in the 3rd century Panegyric on Constantius Caesar, written in 297 AD.

In the Ora Maritima, Roman writer Avienius says that Ireland is inhabited by the gens Hiernorum (the Hierni people, or the Irish). Though the text dates to the 4th century AD, he was using much older sources, and this part is widely agreed to be based on the Massaliote Periplus from the 4th–6th century BC.

In the 5th–6th century AD, Saint Patrick referred to the Irish as the Hiberionaci, (genitive plural Hiberionacum).

== Érainn ==
The Iverni are identified with the early medieval Érainn. In early Irish genealogical tracts, the Érainn are regarded as an ethnic group, distinct from the Laigin and Cruthin. In Munster, population groups classed as Érainn include the Corcu Loígde in southwest County Cork, the Múscraige in Counties Cork and Tipperary, the Corcu Duibne in County Kerry, and the Corcu Baiscinn in west County Clare. In Ulster, the Dál Riata and Dál Fiatach (or Ulaid) in Ulster are classed as Érainn. The Déisi Muman (of Munster), and the Déisi Temro (of Tara) or Déisi Breg (of Brega), are also claimed to be Érainn.

The Érainn appear to have been a powerful group in the proto-historic period, but in early historical times were largely reduced to politically marginal status, with the notable exception of the enigmatic Osraige.The most important of the Munster Érainn, the Corcu Loígde, retained some measure of prestige even after they had become marginalised by the Eóganachta in the 7th or 8th century. It is likely that the sometimes powerful Uí Liatháin and their close kin the Uí Fidgenti originally belonged to the Érainn/Dáirine as well, but were later counted among the Eóganachta for political reasons. Another prominent Érainn people of early Munster are believed to have been the Mairtine, who by the early historical period have vanished from the Irish landscape, although they may be in part ancestral to the later Déisi Tuisceart and Dál gCais.

The historical sept of the Uí Maicc Iair ("grandsons of the son of Iar") and the MAQI IARI of ogham inscriptions also appear to be related. The personal name Iar is simply another variant of the root present in Iverni and Érainn. Finally, the name Íth, given in the genealogies as the ultimate ancestor of the Corcu Loígde (Dáirine) also preserves the same root as Iverni/Érainn, thus completing a basic picture of the Iverni/Érainn and their kindred in later historical Ireland.

=== Darini, Dáirine ===
It seems likely the Iverni/Érainn were related to Ptolemy's Darini of eastern Ulster, later called the Dáirine. The name "Dáirine" implies descent from an ancestor called Dáire (*Dārios), as claimed by several historical peoples identified as Érainn, including the Dál Riata and Dál Fiatach in eastern Ulster as well as the Érainn of Munster. An early name for Dundrum, County Down, is recorded as Dún Droma Dáirine, and the name Dáirine was applied to the Corcu Loígde, further suggesting a relationship between the Dáirine and the Érainn.

=== Clanna Dedad ===
The genealogies trace the Érainn from two eponymous ancestors, Ailill Érann and Íar mac Dedad. Legendary relatives of the latter include the Cland Dedad (offspring of Deda mac Sin), a Munster people who appear in the Ulster Cycle, led by Cú Roí, son of Dáire mac Dedad, and the legendary High King Conaire Mór, grandson of Iar and ancestor of the Síl Conairi.

== O'Rahilly's theory ==
T. F. O'Rahilly proposed in the 1930s that the Iverni/Érainn were Brittonic Celts who settled in Ireland around 500 BC, and were conquered by invading Gaels around 100 BC. He pointed to myths and certain loanwords in Irish. O'Rahilly believed that the term iarmbélra or iarnbélra ('archaic speech') actually meant "Ivernic/Érainn language", and that this unattested language was spoken until the 7th century AD.

His theory has been rejected by later linguists, archaeologists and historians. There is no archaeological or genetic evidence of large migrations to Ireland after the Bronze Age. Evidence shows that the Iverni and the Érainn were Gaelic-speaking from the beginning of recorded history. The oldest surviving examples of Gaelic are ogham inscriptions in Archaic Irish – most of these are in Érainn territory in the southwest. The Déisi, who were classed as Érainn, brought this ogham Irish to south Wales.

== See also ==
- List of Irish kingdoms
- List of Celtic tribes
- Mac Con
