= Uaithni =

Early Irish population group

The tribes of Ireland mentioned by Ptolemy. The Uaithni (Auteini) are on the west coast.

The Uaithni were a people of early Ireland, who in early medieval times lived in north-eastern County Limerick and the adjoining part of County Tipperary, and had traditions that they once lived west of the River Shannon. Their name derives from a reconstructed Proto-Celtic *Autēniī, and they have been identified as the Auteini (Αύτεινοι) referred to in Ptolemy's 2nd century Geography as living in approximately County Galway.

Two branches of the Uaithni are known: the Uaithni Cliach, corresponding to the later barony of Owneybeg in County Limerick, and the Uaithni Tire, corresponding to the barony of Owney and Arra in County Tipperary. The Annals of the Four Masters record the death of Ainle, son of Cathan, lord of the Uaithni Cliach, killed by Vikings in AD 914; of Dubhdabharc, son of Maelmordha, lord of the Uaithni Tire, in 949; of Eochaidh Ua Loingsigh, lord of the Uaithni Tire, in 1080; and of Cuilen Ua Cathalan, lord of the Uaithni Cliach, in 1107.

== See also ==
- Pre-Norman invasion Irish Celtic kinship groups, from whom many of the modern Irish surnames came from
