= Munster =

Traditional province in the south of Ireland

Munster An Mhumhain (Irish)
- Flag Coat of arms

- Coordinates: 52°15′N 9°00′W
- Province: Ireland
- Counties: Clare; Cork; Kerry; Limerick; Tipperary; Waterford

Government
  - Teachtaí Dála: 15 Fianna Fáil TDs; 9 Fine Gael TDs; 8 Sinn Féin TDs; 5 Independent TDs; 3 Independent Ireland TDs; 3 Labour Party TDs; 3 Social Democrat TDs
  - MEPs^{[a]}: 1 Fine Gael MEP; 2 Fianna Fáil MEP; 1 Sinn Féin MEP; 1 Independent MEP

Area
  - Total: 24,684 km^{2} (9,531 sq mi)
  - Rank: 1st

Population (2022)
  - Total: 1,373,346
  - Rank: 3rd
  - Density: 55.637/km^{2} (144.10/sq mi)
- Demonym: Mumhanach / Munsterian
- Time zone: UTC±0 (WET)
  - Summer (DST): UTC+1 (IST)
- Eircode routing keys: Beginning with E, H, P, T, V, X (primarily)
- Telephone area codes: 02x, 05x, 06x (primarily)
- ISO 3166 code: IE-M
- Patron Saint: Ailbe of Emly a. Munster is part of the South constituency; the six Munster counties contain 67.7% of the population of this constituency.

Munster (Irish: an Mhumhain [ə ˈwuːnʲ] or Cúige Mumhan [ˌkuːɟə ˈmˠuːnˠ]) is the largest of the four provinces of Ireland, located in the south west of the island, entirely within the Republic of Ireland. In early Ireland, the Kingdom of Munster was one of the kingdoms of Gaelic Ireland ruled by a "king of over-kings" (Irish: rí ruirech). Following the Norman invasion of Ireland, the ancient kingdoms were shired into counties for administrative and judicial purposes. In later centuries, local government legislation has seen further sub-division of the historic counties.

Munster has no official function for local government purposes. For the purposes of the ISO, the province is listed as one of the provincial sub-divisions of the State (ISO 3166-2:IE) and coded as "IE-M". Munster covers an area of 24,675 km^{2} (9,527 sq mi). Its population was 1,373,346 in 2022, with Cork being the largest city. Other significant urban centres in the province include Limerick and Waterford.

== History ==
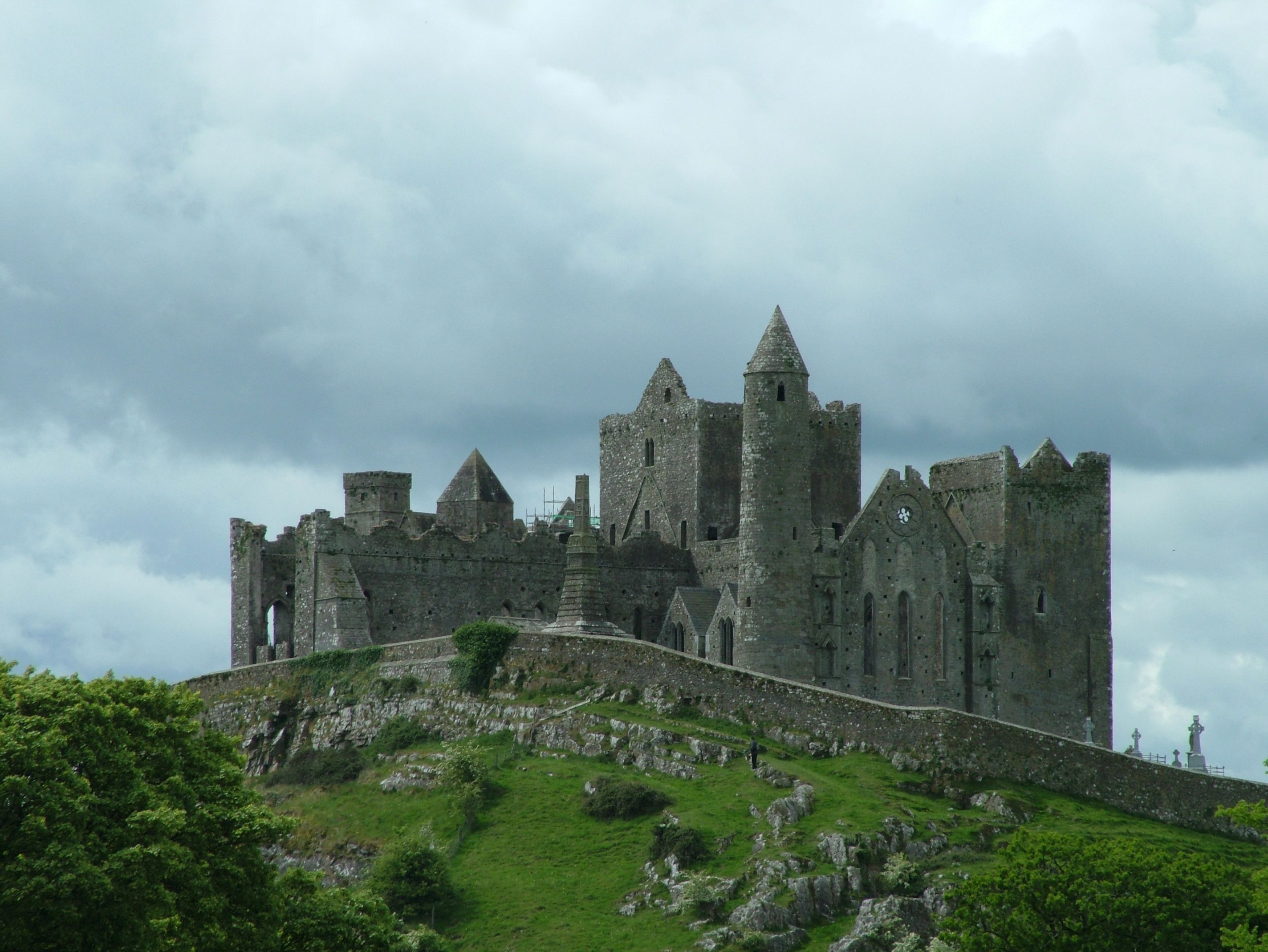
The Rock of Cashel, County Tipperary, historical seat of the Kings of Munster

In the early centuries AD, Munster was the domain of the Iverni peoples and the Clanna Dedad familial line, led by Cú Roí and to whom the king Conaire Mór belonged. In the 5th century, Saint Patrick spent several years in the area and founded Christian churches and ordained priests. The area was ruled by the Dáirine and Corcu Loígde overlords.

During the Early Middle Ages, most of the area was part of the Kingdom of Munster, ruled by the Eóganachta dynasty. Later rulers from the Eóganachta included Cathal mac Finguine and Feidlimid mac Cremthanin. Notable regional kingdoms and lordships of Early Medieval Munster were Iarmuman (West Munster), Osraige (Ossory), Uí Liatháin, Uí Fidgenti, Éile, Múscraige, Ciarraige Luachra, Corcu Duibne, Corcu Baiscinn, and Déisi Muman.

In the 9th century, the Gaels were joined by Norse Vikings, who founded towns such as Cork, Waterford and Limerick, for the most part, incorporated into a maritime empire by the Dynasty of Ivar, who periodically threatened Munster with conquest in the next century. Around this period Ossory broke away from Munster. The Eóganachta dominated Munster until the 10th century, which saw the rise of the Dalcassian clan, who had earlier annexed Thomond, north of the River Shannon to Munster. Their leaders were the ancestors of the O'Brien dynasty and spawned Brian Boru, perhaps the most noted High King of Ireland, and several of whose descendants were also high kings.

In 1118, Munster fractured into the Kingdom of Thomond under the O'Briens, the Kingdom of Desmond under the MacCarthy dynasty (Eóganachta), and the short-lived Kingdom of Ormond under the O'Kennedys (another Dalcassian sept). The three crowns of the flag of Munster represent these three late kingdoms.

There was Norman influence from the 14th century, including by the FitzGerald, de Clare and Butler houses, two of whom carved out earldoms within the Lordship of Ireland, the Earls of Desmond eventually becoming independent potentates, while the Earls of Ormond remained closer to England. The O'Brien of Thomond and MacCarthy of Desmond surrendered and regranted sovereignty to the Tudors in 1543 and 1565, joining the Kingdom of Ireland. The impactful Desmond Rebellions, led by the FitzGeralds, soon followed.

The area of Munster was colonized in the mid to late 16th century by the British plantations of Ireland during the Tudor conquest of Ireland. A group known as the West Country Men played a role in the colonization of Munster. In 1568, attempts to settle a joint stock colony at Kerrycurrihy were made. Richard Grenville seized lands for colonization at Tracton, to the west of Cork harbour. The Munster plantation was the largest colonial venture of the English at the time.

In the mid-19th century much of the area was hit hard in the Great Famine, especially the west. The province was affected by events in the Irish War of Independence in the early 20th century, and there was a brief Munster Republic during the Irish Civil War.

The Irish leaders Michael Collins and earlier Daniel O'Connell came from families of the old Gaelic Munster gentry.

== Culture ==
Noted for its traditions in Irish folk music, and with many ancient castles and monasteries in the province, Munster is a tourist destination. During the fifth century, St. Patrick spent seven years founding churches and ordaining priests in Munster, but a fifth-century bishop named Ailbe is the patron saint of Munster.

In Irish mythology, a number of ancient goddesses are associated with the province including Anann, Áine, Grian, Clíodhna, Aimend, Mór Muman, Bébinn, Aibell and Mongfind. The druid-god of Munster is Mug Ruith and Tlachtga is his daughter. Another legendary figure is Donn.

The province has long had trading and cultural links with continental Europe. The Corcu Loígde had a trading fleet active along the French Atlantic coast, as far south as Gascony, importing wine to Munster. The Eóganachta had ecclesiastical ties with Germany, which show in the architecture of their ceremonial capital at the Rock of Cashel.

The majority of Irish ogham inscriptions are found in Munster, principally in areas occupied by the Iverni, especially the Corcu Duibne. Later, Europe's first linguistic dictionary in any non-Classical language, the Sanas Cormaic, was compiled by Munster scholars, traditionally thought to have been directed by the king-bishop Cormac mac Cuilennáin (d. 908).

The School of Ross in Munster was one of Europe's leading centres of learning in the Early Middle Ages.

=== Sport ===
Several sports in Munster are organised on a provincial basis, or operate competitions along provincial lines. This includes traditionally popular sports such as hurling, Gaelic football, rugby union and soccer, as well as cricket (Munster Cricket Union), hockey (Munster Hockey Union), and others.

==== Hurling and football ====
Munster is noted for its tradition of hurling. Three of the four most successful teams in the All-Ireland Senior Hurling Championship are from Munster; Cork GAA, Tipperary GAA and Limerick GAA. The final of the Munster Senior Hurling Championship is one of the most important days in the Irish GAA calendar. Munster is Ireland's only province whose every single county has won at least one All-Ireland Senior Hurling Championship.

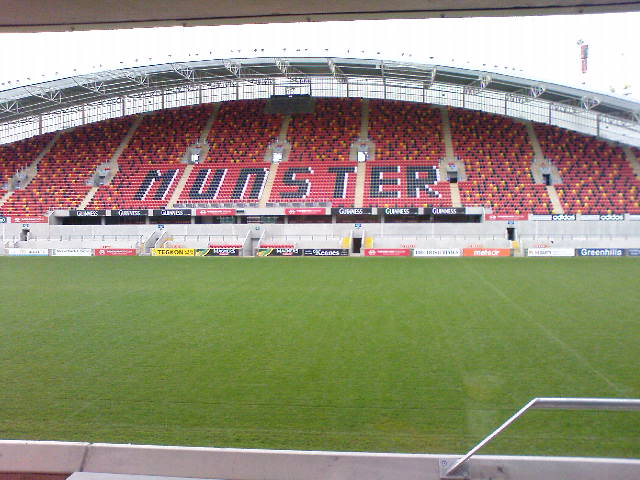
Thomond Park in Limerick – one of two venues in the province which host Munster Rugby games

Traditionally, the dominant teams in Munster football are Kerry GAA and Cork GAA, although Tipperary GAA and Limerick GAA have also won All-Ireland Senior Football Championships. Kerry in particular are the most successful county in the history of football.

==== Rugby union ====
Rugby is a popular game in the cities of Limerick and Cork. Munster Rugby is an Irish Rugby Football Union representative side which competes in the United Rugby Championship competition, winning in 2003, 2009, 2011 and 2023 and in the Heineken Cup, winning in 2006 and 2008. Until 2016, the Munster side was the only Irish side to have defeated the New Zealand All Blacks.

==== Soccer ====
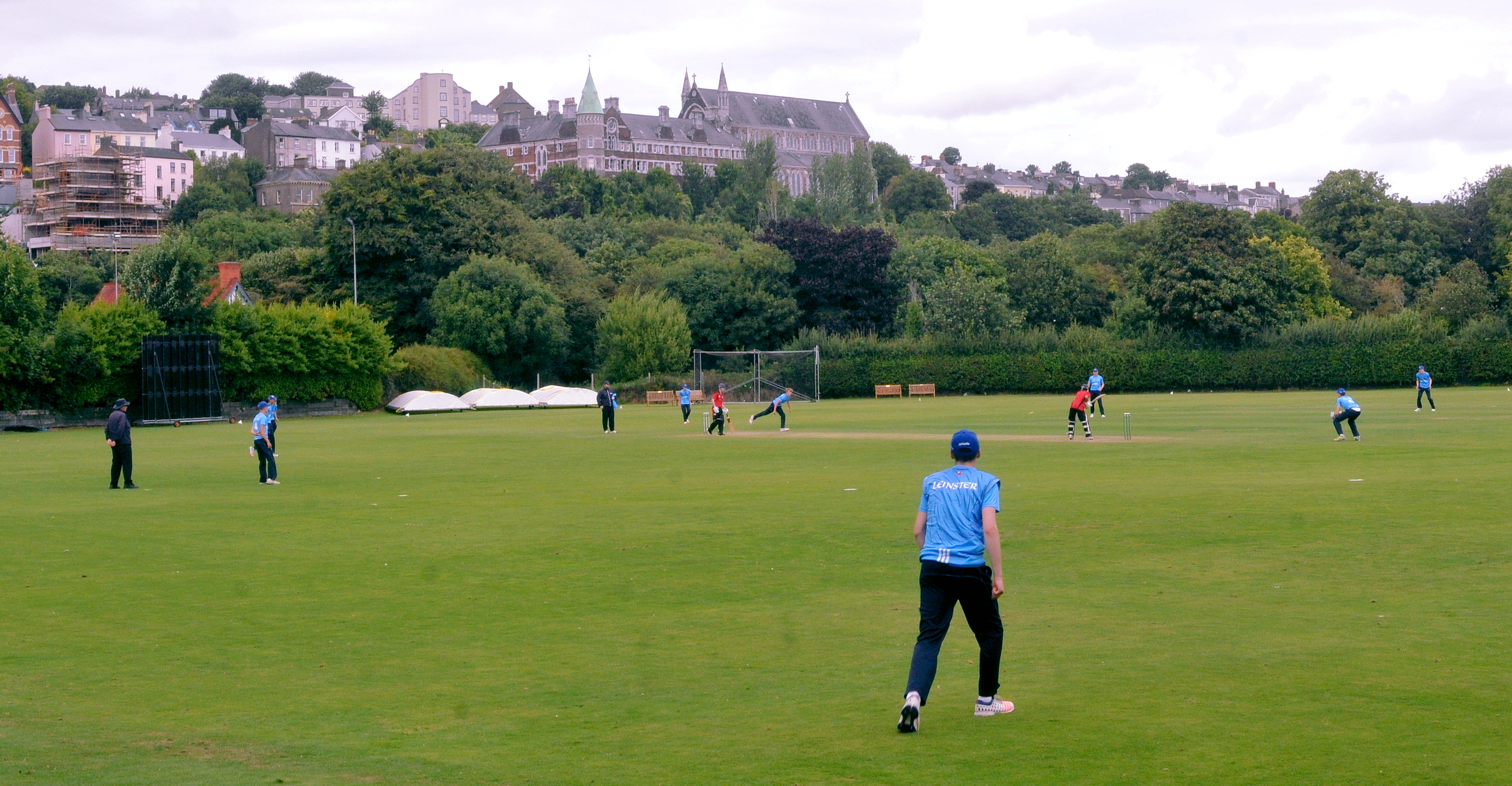
Cricket being played at the Mardyke in Cork, the home venue of the Munster Reds

Association football is also a popular game in Munster, with the Munster Football Association governing a number of aspects of the game in the province. In 2025 five Munster clubs play in the League of Ireland: Waterford FC and Cork City F.C., in the League of Ireland Premier Division; and Cobh Ramblers, Treaty United F.C. and Kerry F.C. in the First Division.

==== Cricket ====
In cricket, the province has been represented by the Munster Reds in the Inter-Provincial Cup one-day competition and the Inter-Provincial Trophy Twenty20 competition. As of 2026, Munster does not participate in Cricket Ireland's Inter-Provincial Championship.

=== Irish language ===
The Irish language, or more specifically Munster Irish, is spoken as a first language in Gaeltachtaí (Irish speaking areas) in a number of areas in the province. This includes West Kerry (Corca Dhuibhne), South Kerry (Uíbh Ráthach), West Cork (Múscraí), south-west Cork (Oileán Cléire), and parts of Waterford (Gaeltacht na Rinne or Gaeltacht na nDéise).

There are about 35,000 Irish language speakers in Munster, with 9,737 native speakers in the Munster Gaeltacht areas of Cork, Kerry and Waterford. There are also 12,219 pupils attending 45 Gaelscoils (Irish language primary schools) and 15 Gaelcholáiste (Irish language secondary schools) in the province. In 2011, there were 13,193 daily speakers outside the education system in Munster.

== Divisions ==
Historical population
Year	Pop.	±%
1981	998,315	—
1986	1,020,577	+2.2%
1991	1,009,533	−1.1%
1996	1,033,903	+2.4%
2002	1,100,614	+6.5%
2006	1,173,340	+6.6%
2011	1,246,088	+6.2%
2016	1,280,020	+2.7%
2022	1,373,346	+7.3%

The province is divided into six traditional counties: Clare, Cork, Kerry, Limerick, Tipperary and Waterford. Munster is the largest of Ireland's four provinces by land area, and the third largest by population.

County	Population (2022)	Area
Clare (An Clár)	127,938	3,450 km^{2} (1,330 sq mi)
Cork (Corcaigh)	584,156	7,508 km^{2} (2,899 sq mi)
Kerry (Ciarraí)	156,458	4,807 km^{2} (1,856 sq mi)
Limerick (Luimneach)	209,536	2,756 km^{2} (1,064 sq mi)
Tipperary (Tiobraid Árann)	167,895	4,305 km^{2} (1,662 sq mi)
Waterford (Port Láirge)	127,363	1,858 km^{2} (717 sq mi)
Total	1,373,346	24,684 km^{2} (9,531 sq mi)

=== Urban areas ===
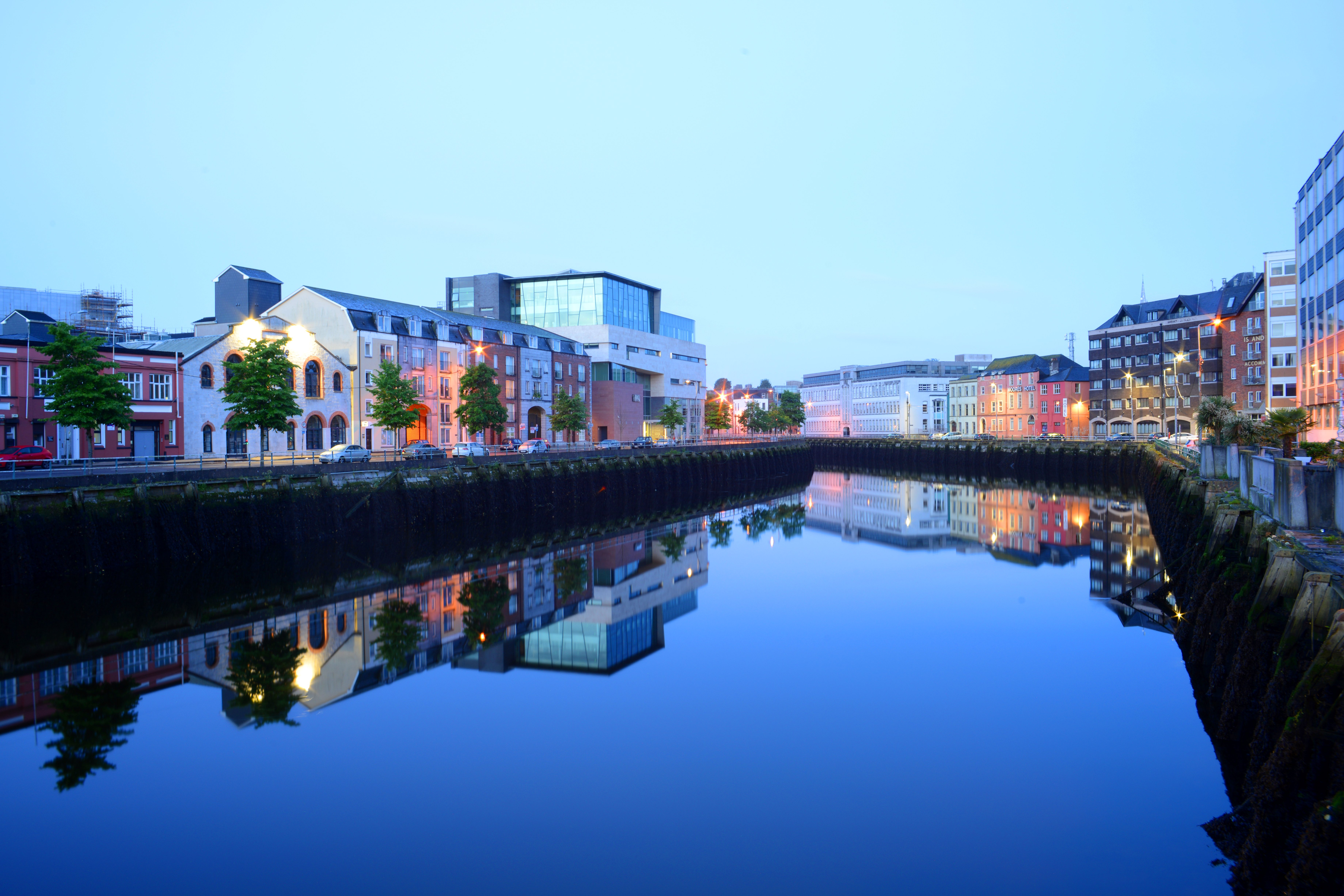
Cork City Quays

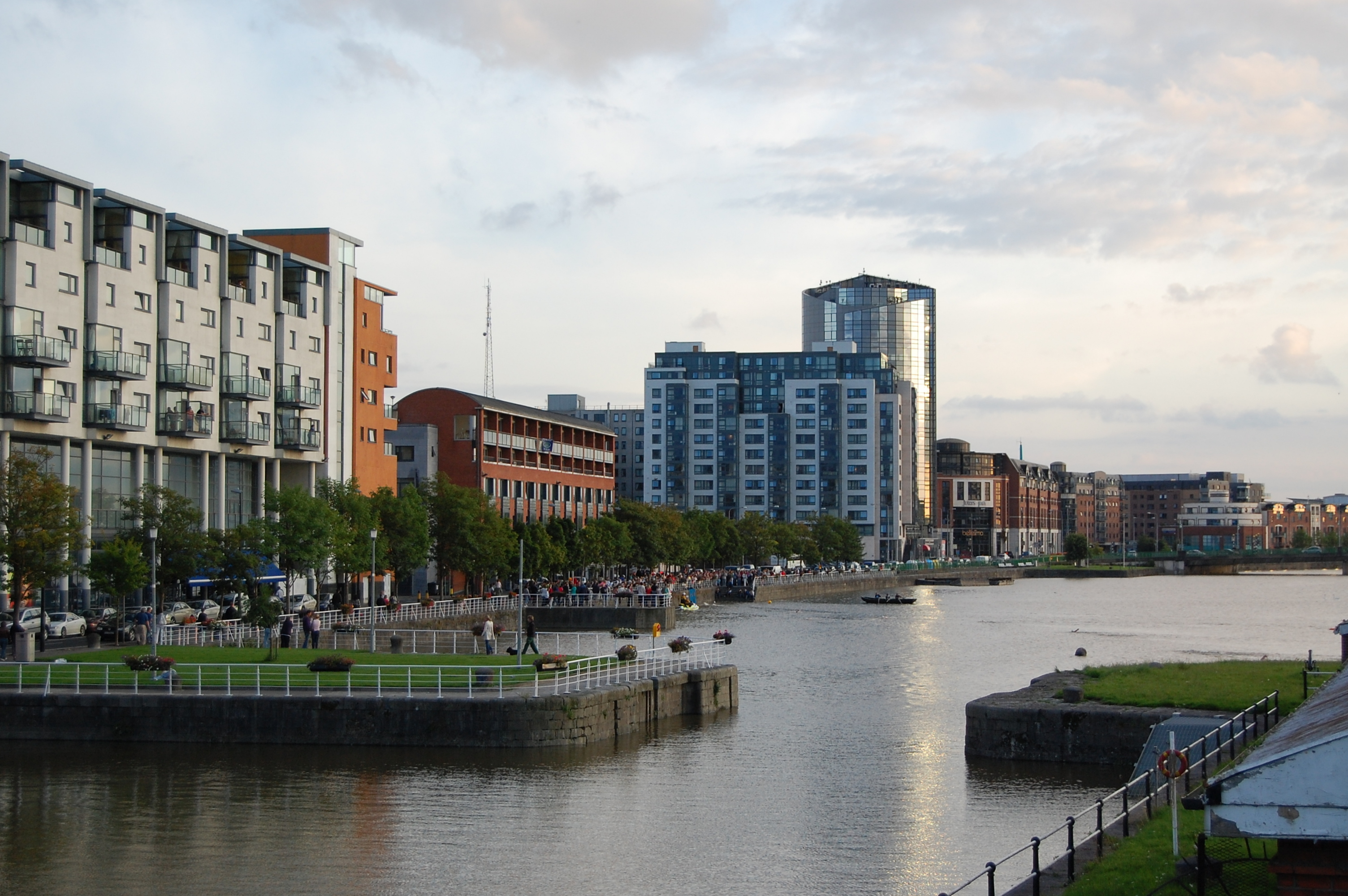
Limerick City Quays

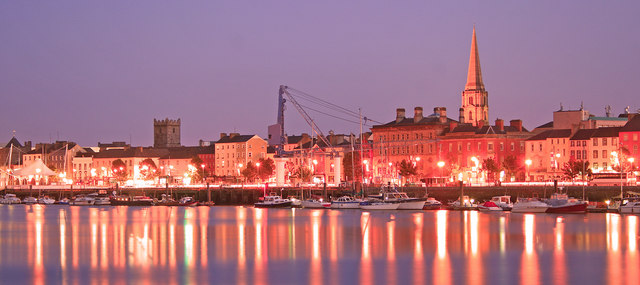
Waterford City Quays

Munster has many large towns, including a number of growing satellite towns, and is the province with the most cities (three) in Ireland. The following is a list of urban areas in Munster in order of size in 2022, with cities and county towns bolded:

Urban areas over 10,000 inhabitants:

- **Cork** (222,526)
- **Limerick** (102,287)
- **Waterford** (60,079)
- **Ennis** (27,923)
- **Tralee** (26,079)
- **Clonmel** (18,369)^{[A]}
- Carrigaline (18,239)
- Killarney (14,412)
- Cobh (14,148)
- Midleton (13,906)
- Mallow (13,456)
- Tramore (11,277)
- Shannon (10,256)
- Dungarvan (10,081)

Urban areas with 5,000–10,000 inhabitants:

- **Nenagh** (9,895)^{[A]}
- Youghal (8,564)
- Bandon (8,196)
- Thurles (8,185)
- Newcastle West (7,209)
- Fermoy (6,720)
- Passage West-Monktown (6,051)
- Kinsale (5,991)
- Carrick on Suir (5,752)
- Carrigtwohill (5,568)
- Roscrea (5,542)
- Tipperary (5,387)
- Clonakilty (5,112)

== Economy ==
2014 CSO figures indicated that GDP per capita in the province ranged from €28,094 in the South Tipperary/Waterford (South-East) region, to €50,544 in Cork and Kerry (South-West). Disposable income in the province was approximately €22,000 per person in 2008 – behind the Eastern and Dublin region (€25,000 per person) and ahead of the Border, Midland and Western regions (€20,000 per person).

Area	Population	Counties	City	GDP € (2012)	GDP per person €	GDP € (2014)	GDP per person €
South-West Region	660,000	Cork & Kerry	Cork	€32.3 bn	€48,500	€33.745 bn	€50,544
Mid-West Region	380,000	Limerick & North Tipperary & Clare	Limerick	€11.4 bn	€30,300	€12.116 bn	€31,792
South-East Region	460,000	Waterford & South Tipperary	Waterford	€12.8 bn	€25,600	€14.044 bn	€28,094
Notes: Some of SE Region is in Leinster | Source: Eurostat

=== Agriculture ===
Munster's agricultural industry centres around the Golden Vale pasturelands which cover counties Cork, Limerick and Tipperary. Kerry Group manufactures dairy products from the dairy cows of the region. Glanbia is a food producer which operates an "innovation centre" in the region. Dawn Meats operate from County Waterford.

=== Retail ===
Irish-owned retailer Dunnes Stores was founded in Cork. Ireland's largest supermarket group, the Musgrave Group, is based in Munster.

=== Employment ===
Large employers in the region include AOL, Bausch & Lomb, Dairygold, Dell, Amazon, Motorola, Amgen, Pfizer, Analog Devices, Fexco Financial Services, Vistakon, Waterford Crystal, Apple Computer, Intel, Novartis, O2, Lufthansa Technik, Kerry Group, Siemens, Sony and Blizzard Entertainment.

The largest employment hub in Munster is Metropolitan Cork, where a number of multinational firms are located in the Cork city area, including at Little Island. The Shannon Free Zone, in County Clare and near Limerick city, is also a centre of employment.

== In media ==
A number of television companies and studios have (or had) a Munster-focus. These include RTÉ Cork (RTÉ's regional studio in Cork), South Coast TV and Channel South. Channel South transmitted local programming to Cork, Limerick, and parts of Kerry, Waterford, Clare and Tipperary.

Apart from the local city or regional newspapers, a number of print outlets focus or market themselves on a provincial basis. These include the Avondhu (covering parts of Cork, Waterford, Limerick and Tipperary), the Nationalist & Munster Advertiser, the Munster Express, and others.

== See also ==
- Provinces of Ireland
- New Munster Province
- Wild Atlantic Way

== Notes ==
^{A} County Tipperary, arising from the 2014 amalgamation of North Tipperary and South Tipperary councils, has two county towns
