= Lugaid mac Con Roí =

See Lugaid for other figures of the same name, and Lug for the god the name derives from.

In the Ulster Cycle of Irish mythology, Lugaid mac Con Roí was the son of Cú Roí mac Dáire. He was also known as Lugaid mac Trí Con ("son of three hounds").

He avenged his father's death by killing Cúchulainn after conspiring with Medb and the children of other people Cúchulainn had killed.

After Lugaid's spear had spilled out his innards, Cúchulainn tied himself to a standing stone (traditionally said to be Clochafarmore) so he could die standing up. Only when a raven landed on his shoulder was Lugaid convinced he was dead. As Lugaid cut off his head, Cúchulainn's sword fell from his hand and cut off Lugaid's hand.

Conall Cernach pursued him. As Lugaid had lost a hand, Conall fought him with one hand tucked into his belt, but he only won when his horse took a bite out of Lugaid's side. He took Lugaid's head and set it on a stone, but his blood melted the stone and the head sank right through it.

== See also ==
- Mac Con
- Lugaid Riab nDerg
- Lugaid Loígde
