= Corcu Duibne =

Kingdom in medieval Kerry, Ireland

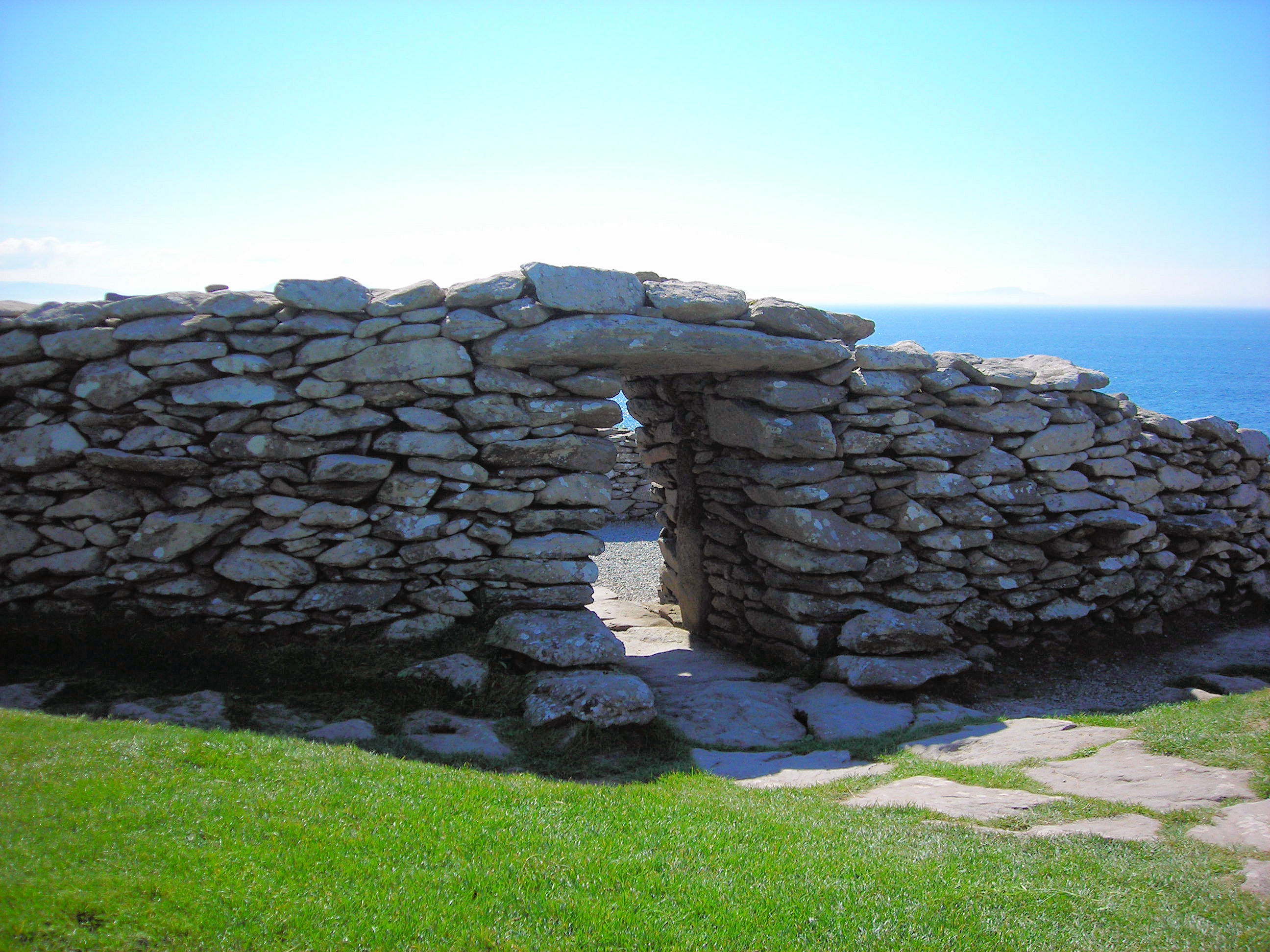
The Dunbeg Fort on the Dingle Peninsula

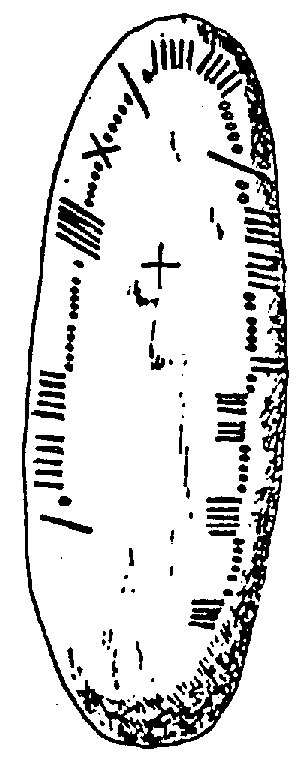
An Ogam inscribed stone found at Ballintaggart, County Kerry. The text is read as MAQQI IARI (K)[OI] MAQQI MUCCOI DOVVINIAS, commemorating "Mac-Iari", a member of the Corco Duibne. Drawn by Cork architect and antiquarian Richard Rolt Brash (1817–1876) and published in 1879 in his posthumous work The Ogam Inscribed Monuments of the Gaedhil in the British islands.

The Corcu Duibne (Modern Irish: Corca Dhuibhne), which means "seed or tribe of Duibhne" (the name of a goddess), was a notable kingdom in prehistoric and medieval County Kerry, Ireland which included the Dingle Peninsula, the Iveragh Peninsula and connecting lands. The tribe belonged to the Érainn and claimed descent from the legendary Conaire Mór, possibly making them distant cousins of such far off kingdoms as Dál Riata in Ulster and Scotland, as well as the closer Múscraige and Corcu Baiscind. All the tribes belonged to the Síl Conairi of legend and ultimately traced their descent from the Clanna Dedad.

== Septs and relations with other kingdoms ==
The ruling Irish clans of the Corcu Duibne were O'Shea, O'Falvey, and O'Connell.

Noted creators of ogham inscriptions, with over one third of all Irish inscriptions found in their region, the existence of the Corcu Duibne is attested as early as the 5th century. These tell us they claimed descent from a female ancestor DOVINIA.

The Iron Age mountaintop fortress Caherconree, preserving the name of the legendary Cú Roí, a cousin of Conaire Mór, is found on the Dingle Peninsula, the name of which in Modern Irish is Corca Dhuibhne.

Relations between the Corcu Duibne and the nearby Eóganacht Locha Léin are poorly understood, but it appears they spent at least some period of time under the nominal overlordship of the latter in the powerful, but relatively short-lived Kingdom of Iarmuman. Rule from distant overkingdom of Eóganacht Chaisil is not apparent and so it is likely that the Corcu Duibne kingdom had an independent, if remote, existence in the first millennium.

== Legendary origins ==
The 8th-century text known as The Expulsion of the Déisi attributes to the Corcu Duibne an eponymous founder, Corc Duibne, a scion of the branch of the Érainn royal line called the Síl Conairi, after Conaire Mór. In particular, the later "B version" of the text includes a lengthy episode describing Corc's birth and childhood deeds. Corc and his twin brother Cormac are born of incest to Coirpre Músc (a quo Múscraige) and Duihind, children of Conaire Cóem, a descendant of Conaire Mór. Their conception causes the crops to fail, and the people determine to immolate them to remove their curse. However, a druid steps in and offers to take Corc to an offshore island so that the abomination is out of Ireland. Reciting a poem predicting great things for Corc's descendants, the druid and his wife Boí take the boy to the remote island of Inis Boí. Every morning for the next year, Boí performs a purification ritual in which she gives Corc an ablution while he is seated on the back of an otherworldly white cow with red ears. Finally one morning Corc's curse leaves him and enters the cow, who jumps into the ocean and turns to stone, becoming the rock of Bó Boí. Boí takes Corc to his grandmother, Sárait, daughter of Conn Cétchathach, and eventually convinces her to take him back.

When he is older Corc is sent to serve as hostage in the court of Cormac mac Airt, King of Tara. There he is fostered by Óengus Gaíbúaibthech, a leader of the Déisi. When Óengus and his people are expelled from Tara over a bloody dispute with the king's son, Corc absconds from hostageship and joins his foster-father, fighting beside him in many battles. Eventually the Déisi wander to the southern coast, and come to the island where Corc was reared. He tries to convince them to settle there, but they elect to move farther north. Corc remains, and founds his dynasty.

== Annalistic references ==
- AI989.4 Congal son of Anrudán, king of Corcu Duibne, dies.
- AI1013.4 Mac Raith son of Congal, king of Corcu Duibne dies.
- AI1027.2 Death of Crínán son of Fáilbe, king of Corcu Duibne.
- AI1041.9 Ua Ségda, king of Corcu Duibne was slain.
- AI1042.4 Mathgamain Ua Fáilbi, royal heir of Corcu Duibne was slain.
- AI1062.4 Two of the Uí Fháilbi, royal heirs of Corcu Duibne, were slain by the Uí Echach in Baí Bérre.
- AI1063.4 Cú Dub Ua Fáilbe, king of Corcu Duibne dies.
- AI1064.6 A great foray by Tairdelbach into Corcu Duibne and Eógan acht, and it is impossible to enumerate all the cows and other cattle taken on that raid.
- AI1066.3 Loingsech Ua Domnaill, another king of Uí Echach, was slain by the Corcu Duibne.
- AI1096.5 Mathgamain Ua Ségda, king of Corcu Duibne, rested in Christ.
- AI1115.7 The slaying of Lochlainn Ua Fáilbi by Murchad Ua Ségda.
- AI1118.6 Tadc Ua Ségda was slain by the foreigners of Luimnech and by Ua Fáilbi, each having committed treachery against the other.
- AI1127.5 Murchad Ua Ségda, In Gilla Manntach Ua Fáilbi, and Cathal Ua Cathuil were slain.

== See also ==
- Pre-Norman invasion Irish Celtic kinship groups, from which many of the modern Irish surnames came
