= Dáire Cerbba =

- King of Medón Mairtíne
- Reign: possibly 326–33 AD
- Born: Brega, Ireland
- Issue: Fidach, Eochu Liathán, Fiachu Fidgenid, Ded, Dau, Dera
- House: poss. Dáirine, later Eóganachta

Dáire Cerbba (or Cerba, Cearba, Cearb; meaning "Silver Dáire" or "Dáire the Sharp/Cutting") was a 4th-century Irish dynast who was evidently a king of late prehistoric central northern Munster, called Medón Mairtíne at the time. A frequently believed grandson of his, Crimthann mac Fidaig, was High King of Ireland and some British territories, and another descendant Bressal mac Ailello may have been King of Munster, and whose sister Angias was Queen of Lóegaire mac Néill, High King of Ireland. Finally, another descendant, according to Geoffrey Keating, was a king of Munster named Cormac, son of Ailill, son of Eochaid, son of Dáire Cearb.

Unlike many other individuals due to name or obvious descent sometimes considered Dáirine, neither Dáire Cerbba nor his family appear to have any certain associations with the Corcu Loígde and are instead considered, at least officially, relatively close relations of the Éoganachta.

== Origins and relations ==
=== Outline ===
Of uncertain origins, Dáire Cerbba is named in many early and late sources as the grandfather of the semi-mythological Mongfind and Crimthann mac Fidaig, and the most frequently named early ancestor of the historical Uí Liatháin and Uí Fidgenti. All of these are historically associated with the province of Munster, but according to the early manuscript Rawlinson B 502, Dáire Cerbba was born in Brega, County Meath, and got his epithet from a location there. This is otherwise unexplained. He may or may not have been a relative of Conall Corc (son of Lugaid), the founder of the Eóganachta dynasty.

He is often confused or paired with Maine Munchaín, who may be his father or twin brother, depending on the source, or this is an alias and the two people are the same. Both are listed in the surviving genealogies as sons of Ailill Flann Bec, grandfather of Conall Corc, but the arrangement changes from source to source.

Maine Munchaoin and Daire Cearba were noted as twins (being born at one birth), and some manuscripts attribute Maine's offspring as being fathered by Daire due to Maine's inability; as a result, Maine tends to be overlooked as an ancestor, and the Ui Fidgheinte typically list Daire as their progenitor. Alternatively, another tradition states the druid Mug Ruith placed a magical chafer between them so that neither of them, nor their descendants, could ever come to the aid of the other.

The non-English language of the following sections is composed of Latin, Old Irish and Middle Irish, generally considered to be in that order of antiquity when considering genealogical tracts specifically. The genealogical Irish, as opposed to proper prose or poetry, can be easily enough understood with the aid if necessary of the Dictionary of the Irish Language, and memory, and so is usually left untranslated. Furthermore, it has been the intentional case to trim all non-essential information from the following passages and their entries. Both the overly extended families and many further descendants of those central ones remaining have only brief mention below.

=== Rawlinson B 502 ===
¶1080] Ailill Flann Bec duos filios habuit id est Lugaid & Dáre Cerbba. ...

¶1081] Dáre Cerbba dano in dara mc Ailella Flainn Bic .vi. filios habuit id est: Fiachu Fidgenid a quo Úi Fidgeinti, Eochu Liathán a quo Úi Liatháin, Fidach a quo Crimthann Már m. Fidaig rí h- Érenn & Alban, Dedad a quo Úi Dedaid id est Úi Braccáin & Úi Ailella i n-airthiur Éoganachta Caisil, Dau et Der.

¶1096] Cethri mc leis .i. Fidach diarbu mc Crimthann Már & Luigdech for óenleth, Maine Munchaín & Dáre Cerbba forsan leth n-aill. Emuin són dano in Maine & in Dáre. Is dóib at-connairc a máthair in fís .i. druimm cach áe díb fri araile inna cliab & dáel inter se .i. Síl Mogad Ruith in druad inter se conná cumaing nech díb cobair araile.

¶1097] Alii dicunt betis sé mc Dáre Cerbba ut dicitur:

Eochu, Fidach, Fiachu, Dau, Dera, Ded; sé meic Dáre chóemem Ceirp h-uaisle láech leirg na ler.

¶1098] Lóch Már mc Ma Femis a quo sunt Éoganachta & Fianna Luigne Úi Dedaid Deocluaid m. Fiachach Oele idem et Fer Dá Liach sed alii dicunt ut praediximus Dau, Ded, Dera, Liathán, Fidach, Fidgenid filios habuisse Dáre Cerbba. Dá Dau dá mc Óengusa Bruigde mc Maine Munchaín nó mc Fiachach Oele. Alii dicunt duos filios fuisse Ailella Flainn Máir.

¶1099] Trí mc Fiachach Fidgenid .i. Brion, Sétna, Láegaire.

¶1100] Secht mc Brioin mc Fiachach .i. Cairpre Goll, Lugaid, Dáre, Fergus, Rus, Cormac, Cosdaire.

¶1103] Secht mc Echach Liatháin m. Dáre Cerba .i. Cairpre, Cóel, Corcc, Corp, Mac Brócc, Ailill Tassach.

¶1104] Ocht mc Ailella Tassaich .i. Láegaire, Bressal, Mac Draignén, Mac Cáirthind, Áed, Feideilmid, Óengus Brecc, Noois éicess &rl.

(Below, Rawlinson B 502 contains additional and alternative pedigrees for first the Uí Liatháin and then Uí Fidgenti quoted from the Psalter of Cashel):

¶1210] ... Meic Caille m. Meic Brócc m. Dáre Cherbba m. Maine Munchaín m. Ailella Flaind Bic m. Fiachach Mullethain.

¶1211] Aliter: Eochaid Liathán m. Maine Cherbba m. Cirbb m. Ailella Flaind Bicc ...

Dáre Cerbba uero ideo hóc nuncupatus est {facsimile page & column 151b} quia natus est i m-Methus Cerbba i m-Bregaib.

¶1236] ... Conaill a quo Úi Chonaill Gabra m. Intait Dárai m. Brioin m. Fiachach Fidgeinti m. Dáre Cherbba m. Ailella Flainn Bic.

¶1237] De chuirr luingge n a n-giall Fidgenid nuncipatus est et qui fecit equum lingneum. In Circio Colmáin h-i l-Liphu agitauit.

¶1238] Alii dicunt combad Fidgenid m. Maine Munchaín m. Ailella Flaind Bic m. Fiachach Fir Dá Liach.

¶1363] ... Brioin m. Fiachach Fidgenid m. Maine Munchaín m. Ailella Flaind Bic.

==== Discussion ====
While not specifically mentioning a Dáire Cerbba, the Archaic Irish poem Amra Con Roi, and belonging the Ulster Cycle, does state that at one time the family of Ded(ad)/Deguth and Dáire (the family of Cú Roí) had descendants who ruled in Brega to contain the advance of the Ulaid from the north. A related poem Brinna Ferchertne further describes the family's deeds in Ireland, including the capture of Uisneach in the midlands and more of their conflict with the Ulaid, although the "Eochu son of Darfind" in the poem is not specified as the later Dáire Cerbba's well known son Eochu the Grey.

=== Laud 610 ===
(The following passage exemplifies the principal variant of the descent scheme, in other words the alternative to that presented in Rawlinson B 502 ¶1080–¶1081):

Eogan mac Ailella mac do Fíachaig Mullethan risinn-abar Fer da líach .i. dá líach dó marbad a athar a n-inbaid a geine & éc a máthar dia breith. Ceithri maic Ailella Flainn Bicc maic Fhíachach .i. Lugaid (Láre) Fidach .i. athair Crimthaind & Mongfhinne. Mane Muncháin, is húad Úi Fidginte. Dáre Cerba, is húad Úi Líatháin. Tri maic Fíachach Fidgennid .i. Brión, Sétna, Laegairi. Secht maic Brióin maic Fíachach .i. Cairpre Goll, Lugaid, Dáre, Fergus, Rus, Cormac, Costaire.

(What follows somewhat later is another passage noted for its resemblance to one found in Rawlinson B 502 and in the Book of Ballymote):

{folio 98a1} Di raind etir maccu Eilella Flanc Bicc.

Cf. Rawl. B 502, p. 149 a32; BB. 173 c35.

Rorandsat a feranda hi cetheora ranna co Comor Trí nUisci. Quattuor filios habuit .i. Fidach, cuius filius Crimthan Mór mac Fidaigm & Luigtheg for óenleth; Maine Muncháin & Dáre cherbae for leith aili. Emmon nhDáre & in Mane. Atchondairc a mmáthair .i. druim cechtarnái fri araile ina clíab & dóel i medón eturru .i. síl Moga Roith in druad, conná cumaic nechtar de cobair araile. It é dano batir hoa & itt é fongiulatar cruiti a n-athar .i. Corco Ché & ind indbaith .i. Corco Muchit. Alii dicunt betis secht maic la Dáre .i. Fíachra, Eocha, Íth, Fidach, Dan, Ded, Dera.

==== Discussion ====
The origins of Maine Muncháin/Munchaín or "(of the) Bright/Fine/Beautiful Neck", Dáire Cerbba's replacement in Laud 610 as an ancestor of the Uí Fidgenti, have evaded scholars for generations, but both the epithet and personal name are known from elsewhere in somewhat related traditions. A certain Énna Munchaín is known from pedigrees preserved in Rawlinson B 502 as a very early ancestor of the Eóganachta and father or grandfather of Dego Dergthened ("Red Fire"), while an important Maine or Muinemon can be found in early Eóganacht tradition as well. Margaret Dobbs considers the various ancient people from Eóganacht tradition named Muinemón or Maine to all be equivalent and in different ways associated with the precious metal gold, and in Laud 610 a passage states that "The seventh man from Nuadat was Muinemon. In his time gold was on necks in Ireland." while a related passage from the Cóir Anmann tells us that "Munemon first put round throats a golden necklet ... Maine Mor was his name." Before his/their time was a Maine Mothechtach Maraicdech (or Main Mairc) who "first invented the bartering of gold and silver, son of Cas Clothach who ruled Brega." And of Énna Munchaín, returning to the Cóir Anmann (although Dobbs does not equate this person with Muinemón/Maine herself, nor mention him or Maine Munchaín), it was said that "there used to be a gold collar around his neck. That is why he was Munchaín." Furthermore, Énna appears to have had, like Dáire Cerbba, his own associations with Brega (Mag Breg), to quote from R. A. S. Macalister's edition of the Lebor Gabála Érenn:

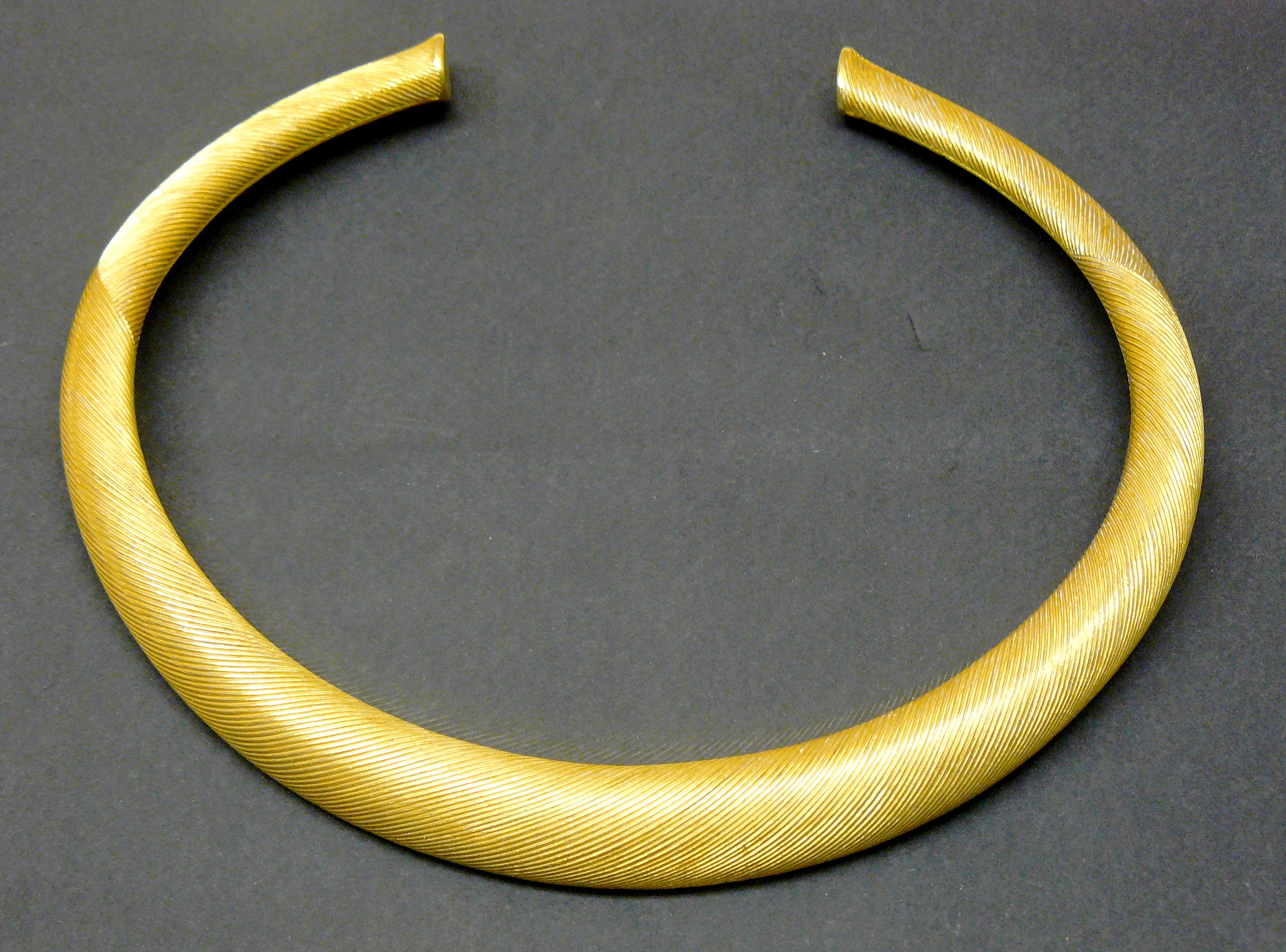
A Bronze Age, early torc in striated gold, northern France, c. 1200–1000 BC, 794 grams

Enna Munchain over Mag Breg
took hostages of the white Gáedil

However, whatever the provenance of the tradition placing some of his career in the midlands, Énna is usually counted an early king of Munster and slayer of Eogan son of Íar mac Degad. The name Ma(i)ne Munchain itself later appears in the midlands, without any known Eóganachta associations, in a pedigree for the Cenél Fiachach of the Southern Uí Néill found in MS H. 2. 7. (TCD). Their territory included Uisneach. Another Ma(i)ne Munchain appears as an ancestor of Mugain of the Osraige, mother of Áed Sláine of the Southern Uí Néill, in a pedigree giving her a descent from Corc mac Luigdech of the Eóganachta, although this family, the Uí Duach Argetrois, are more usually given a descent from the Corcu Loígde kings of Osraige. The Síl nÁedo Sláine, were, in any event, the historical (Southern) Uí Néill rulers of the Kingdom of Brega.

Of final possible relevance is the fact that not distant to the Uí Fidgenti lived a people known as the Uí Maine, founded by their own Maine Mór, and ancient tradition further recalls that the seven sons of Medb and Ailill mac Máta were all named Maine.

=== Book of Leinster ===
A number of pedigrees preserved in the Book of Leinster appear to resemble one quoted from the Psalter of Cashel in Rawlinson B 502 where Dáire Cerbba is made a son of Maine Munchaín. This variety focus specifically on Dáire Cerbba's descendants the Uí Liatháin. Those mentioning or focusing on the Uí Fidgenti omit Maine Munchaín, who in the principle descent scheme variant exemplified in Laud 610 and also found in the Book of Munster, as well as at least suggested in Rawlinson B 502 (depending on whether or not Dáire and Maine may be considered equivalent), completely replaces Dáire Cerbba for the Uí Fidgenti specifically.

=== Flann mac Lonáin ===
Probably the earliest surviving direct mention of Dáire (where assumed Cerbba) in a source from outside the Munster genealogical tradition or any is found in an Old Irish, at least pre-10th century poem, the Maiccni Echach ard a nglé, traditionally attributed to the famous Flann mac Lonáin, Chief Ollam of Ireland. Here both Crimthann and Mongfind can be found and the family are specifically referred to as Dáirine. Flann additionally goes to the trouble once each of calling Crimthann "son of the son of Dáire" and "grandson of Dáire" in the poem.

==== Discussion ====
While obviously contradicting the principal variant of the descent scheme, Flann's language describing Crimthann's family as Dáirine is somewhat problematic, for neither the Uí Fidgenti nor Uí Liatháin, while both claiming descent from Dáire Cerbba, ever once describe themselves as belonging to the Dáirine nor are Crimthann or his sister Mongfind ever in any surviving genealogical source described as belonging to a family other than the para-Eóganachta themselves. Dáirine is in fact in all Munster sources, and Flann is believed to have been from the province, used only as an alternative name for the Corcu Loígde, often considered a more distantly related dynasty, and near relations only of the central Eóganacht septs through Aimend. Various attempts have been made to construct primary descent for some or all of the Eóganachta proper from either the Corcu Loígde or the so-called Érainn altogether, but no consensus has been reached and in fact Crimthann and his family have not actually been the focus of these studies. It is finally the case that Dáire Cerbba is never once in the sources equated or associated with Dáire Sírchréchtach "the Ever-Wounded" of the Corcu Loígde, a King of Tara, even if Cerbba's grandson Crimthann achieves that title approximately two centuries later.

Both Eoin MacNeill and T. F. O'Rahilly believed that most, if not all Dáires from Irish myth and legend may derive from the same prehistoric or mythological figure, or have adopted each other's features to such an extent as to all be composites. The latter stated that Dáire and Cú Roí "are ultimately one and the same", and refers to him/they as "the god of the Otherworld".

=== Keating and Crimthann ===
Geoffrey Keating's Foras Feasa ar Éirinn contains the following passage:

Criomhthann son of Fiodhach, son of Daire Cearb, son of Oilill Flann Beag, son of Fiachaidh Muilleathan, son of Eoghan Mor, son of Oilill Olom of the race of Eibhear, held the sovereignty of Ireland seventeen years. Fidheang, daughter of the king of Connaught, was his wife. This Criomhthann gained victories and obtained sway in Alba, Britain, and France, as the seancha says in the following stanza:—

Criomhthann son of Fiodhach swayed
The lands of Alba and of Erin;
He swayed likewise beyond the clear blue sea
Even the Saxons and the French.

==== Discussion ====
Crimthann Mór in the earliest Irish sources is stated as King of Ireland, King of Ireland and Britain/Scotland, King of Tara, King of Emain Macha, High King of Ireland and possibly/probably Britain/Scotland, and King of Ireland and Britain as fas as the English Channel. He is frequently assumed in origin a King of Munster as well, but this is nowhere clearly stated in the 1st millennium sources.

== King of Medón Mairtine ==
- See: List of kings of Munster

In a strange passage in the notably peculiar Munster epic Forbhais Droma Dámhgháire, Daire Cerbba (Ceirbe) is said to have been king of Medón Mairtine, known to historians as the ancient capital of the Mairtine, a once prominent Érainn people. In fact the passage gives it the alternative names of "... Ardchluain na Féne and Mucfhalach Mac Daire Ceirbe. This Ceirbe was king of Meáin Mairtine. This area is called Emly today..." However it does not specifically state that Dáire belonged to the Mairtine themselves, and perhaps of importance is the fact that this site was historically occupied by the Eóganachta, for whom it was their chief church, namely Emly, which the author of FDD obviously recognizes. The Mairtine themselves belong only to prehistory and legend, but may be in part ancestral to the later Déisi Tuisceart and famous Dál gCais.
