= Conmaicne of Carra =

Early people of Ireland

The Conmhaicne of Carra were an early people of Ireland. Their tuath comprised some or all of the barony of Carra, County Mayo.

== Origin ==
The Conmhaicne or Conmaicne were a people of early Ireland, perhaps related to the Laigin, who dispersed to various parts of Ireland. They settled in Connacht and Longford, giving their name to several Conmaicne territories. Other branches of Conmaicne were located in County Galway, Roscommon, Mayo, and Leitrim.

Old Irish names for Conmaicne Carra appear in Tírechán collections, the Book of Leinster and other old manuscripts-

- Regiones Maicc Ercae in Tirechan's Breverium.
- Maige Maicc Ercae in Tirechan's Vita Tripartita.
- Cuile Conaire.
- campum Caeri;
- Cera i Connachtaib.
- im Mag Cerae; im maigib maicc Ercae.

In his translation of the Book of Fenagh, O'Donovan identifies the Cinel-Cirend with "Crich-mac-Eric" ("Ulster"), but this is surely wrong. (Note: "Crich-Mac-Erc. A name for Ulster, derived from Erc, daughter of Loarn king of Scotland, and mother of Muirchertach Mac Errca, king of Ireland. Muirchertach met a strange fate, having been on the same night drowned in a vat of wine, burned in a house of fire, and then killed (!), through the machinations of a fairy in the year 531.". But the Conmaicne Carra lived in Connacht.) Walsh states the "Conmaicne of Crich Meic Eircce is explained by Cenel Meic Eircce which is equated with the Men of Cera, they gave their name to the barony of Carra".

== Territory ==
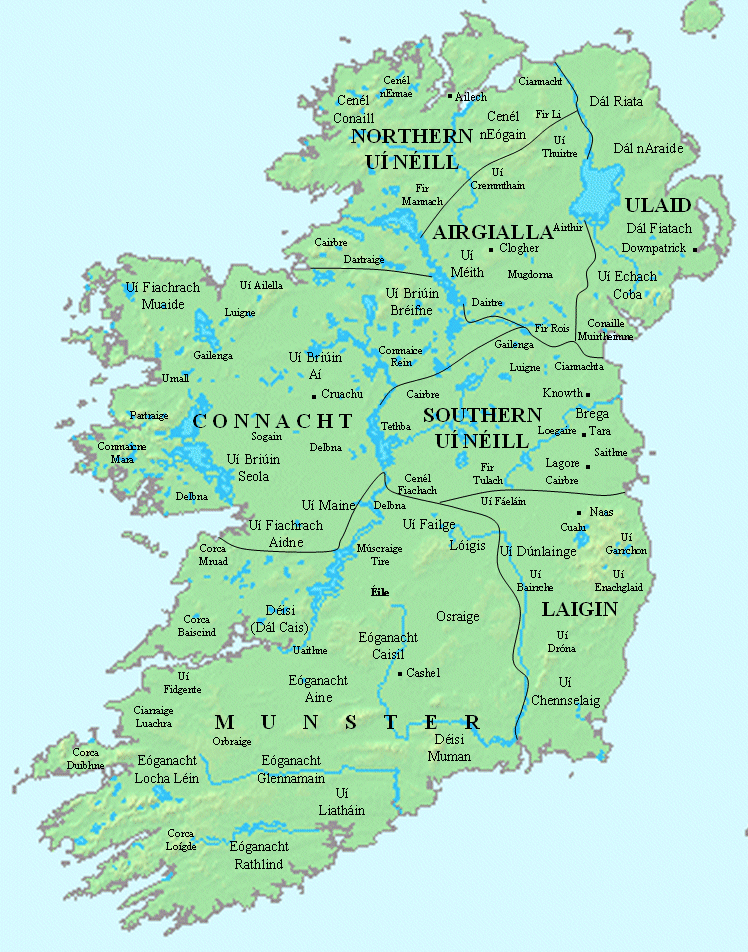
Early peoples and kingdoms of Ireland, c.800

The Irish name for the barony of Carra, Ceara, reflects the ancient population group named Conmaicne Carra. The territory was bounded by lakes, and native Irish forests in places. To the south was the Conmaicne Cuile Tolad, now the barony of Kilmaine. To the north is the barony of Tirawley. Eoin MacNeill made interesting comments on the Conmaicne Carra territory-

"i. e. Fir Cherai, their land was wide, i. e. the territory of Cera, until the sons of Brion took it from them as eric for Brion, who fell by Fiachra in the battle of Damchluain.' Our texts refer evidently to a more limited district, which must be located in the northern part of the barony of Carra, bordering on the barony of Tirawley."

A place called Corcu Temne or "Temenrige" is mentioned in Trichans's Brevium as "i Ceri contra solis occasum" which MacNeill translated as "in the west of Cere/Carra".

== Septs ==
O'Culachain (O'Colahan), O'Gormog, Murrays, Ó Móráin, O'Learghusa and O'Tierney families were septs of Conmaicne Carra. The Ó Móráin and O'Tierney surnames appear in other Conmaicne territories.

== Patrician churches ==
In the original Vita tripartita Sancti Patricii, Tírechán said Saint Patrick travelled here from Conmaicne Cuile Tolad, establishing a church at a place named Cuille Corr (Old Irish).

== Annals ==
The "men of Carra" are mentioned in the Annals of the Four Masters.

== See also ==
- Conmhaicne
- Conmaicne Cuile

== Notes and references ==
=== Primary sources ===
- O'Donovan, John, ed. (1856). Annála Rioghachta Éireann. Annals of the Kingdom of Ireland by the Four Masters ... with a Translation and Copious Notes. 7 vols. Translated by O'Donovan (2nd ed.). Dublin: Royal Irish Academy. CELT editions. Full scans at Internet Archive: Vol. 1; Vol. 2; Vol. 3; Vol. 4; Vol. 5; Vol. 6; Indices.
- MacKillop, James (2004). "Conmaicne. Oxford Reference.". A Dictionary of Celtic Mythology. Oxford University Press.
- Ó Cróinín, Dáibhí (2016). A Miracle of Learning: Studies in Manuscripts and Irish Learning: Essays in Honour of William O'Sullivan. Routledge. ISBN 978-1351963220.
- Wilde, William R. (2013). Lough Corrib, Its Shores and Islands: with Notices of Lough Mask (illustrated ed.). Lulu.com. ISBN 978-1291406757.
- MacNeill, Eoin (1932). "The Vita Tripartita of St. Patrick". Ériu. Ériu, vol. 11: 1–41. JSTOR 30008085.
- Bieler, Ludwig (1979). The Patrician Texts in the Book of Armagh (Scriptores Latini Hiberniae X, Tírechán ed.). pp. 122–167.
- Best, R.I.; Lawlor, H.J. (1931). The Martyrology of Tallaght (Leabhar ed.). London.
- Best; Bergin; O'Brien; O'Sullivan (1954–1983). An Leabhar Laighneach: The Book of Leinster. Vol. I–VI.
- Knox, Hubert Thomas (1908). The History of the County of Mayo, to the close of the sixteenth century (PDF). Dublin: Hodges, Figgis & Co., Ltd.
