= Mairtine =

The Mairtine (Martini, Marthene, Muirtine, Maidirdine, Mhairtine) were an important people of late prehistoric Munster, Ireland who by early historical times appear to have completely vanished from the Irish political landscape. They are notable for their former capital, Medón Mairtine, becoming the chief church of the later Eóganachta, namely Emly.

== Mairtine mac Sithcheann ==
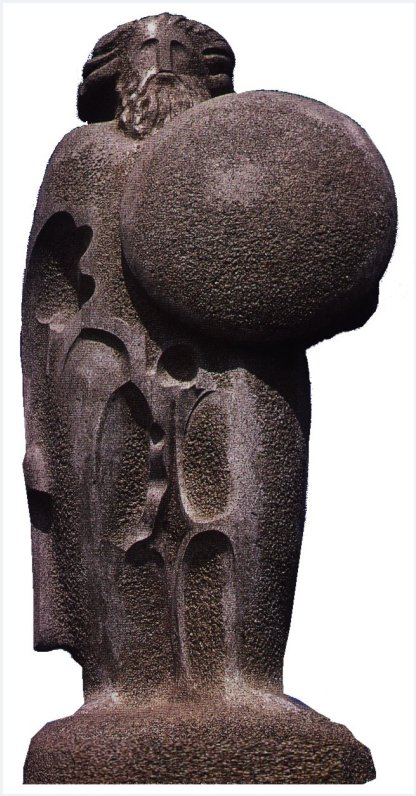
Breogán; statue in A Coruña

Geoffrey Keating's History of Ireland includes the following section, which may refer to the eponymous ancestor:

"Eochaidh Apthach (Eochu Apthach) son of Fionn, son of Oilill, son of Flann Ruadh, son of Rothlan, son of Mairtine, son of Sithcheann, son of Riaghlan, son of Eoinbhric son of Lughaidh, son of Ioth, son of Breoghan (Breogán), held the sovereignty of Ireland one year; and he was called Eochaidh Apthach because of the number who died in Ireland in his time; for the plague or other disease seized upon the men of Ireland each month, from which many of them died; hence the name Eochaidh Apthach clung to him; for apthach means 'fatal'; and he himself fell by Fionn son of Bratha."

This would make Mairtine mac Sithcheann a gr-gr-gr-gr-grandson of Breogán mac Brath, mythical king of Galicia. Breogan's grandson, Míl Espáine, was the father and uncle of the first Goidelic people to settle in Ireland.

Eochu Apthach, Mairtine's gr-gr-gr-grandson, is given as a member of the Corcu Loígde. His reign is variously given as the 6th/5th, 7th, or 8th, century BC.

However, it is nowhere explicitly stated that Mairtine mac Sithcheann was the eponym of the Mairtine people. Plus, the Mairtine people are accorded status of Fir Bolg, who were predecessors of the Gaels.

== Medón Mairtine ==
This term has been translated as middle of the Mairtine [nation], indicating that modern-day Emly, County Tipperary, was the central capital of the tribe. It is due west of Tipperary town, which is due west of Cashel, seat of the historic kings of Munster. It is therefore at what can be roughly regarded as the geographic centre (or middle, medón) of Munster.

In an essay of 2000, Nollaig Ó Muraíle notes the remote possibility that some of the Mairtine Mór "might just" have been located in Connacht, though he does not specify where.

== Ethnicity ==
Dáibhí Ó Cróinín notes that in one tradition, preserved in the Book of Lecan's still unpublished genealogies, the Mairtine are said to have been expelled from the north of Ireland, or Leth Cuinn, and to have settled in the territory later known as In Déis Tuaisceirt, which would become Dál gCais. More specifically, following a battle or series of battles, there was a reshuffling of geographic locations within Ireland, possibly helping form an Eóghanacht confederation that is spoken of in the Book of Munster and other sources. In Irish myth, there was a battle in 123AD between Eoghan Mor and Conn of the Hundred Battles, and it divided Ireland into two equal parts, by the boundary of Esker Riada - a long ridge of hills from Dublin to Galway.

The traditional story is that the Mairtine are typically associated with Erainn, Benntraige, Ulaidhe, and the Eóghanachta. They are noted in the Book of Munster and by other scholars,. In a late poem they are given as one of the tribes of the Domnainn, and are elsewhere, in popular tradition, said to have belonged to the mythological Fir Bolg. I

== References in Leabhar na nGenealach ==
Dubhaltach MacFhirbhisigh records them in association with the Éarainn and Fir Bolg, listing them as the latter people in his Leabhar na nGenealach. He first mentions them in the statement that "Conmhal mac Ebhir, ri Ereann, do bhris cath Locha Lén for Eurna, Mairtine, agus for Moghruith mac Mofebhis d'Fearuibh Bolg"/"Conmhal (Conmáel) s. Éibhear, king of Ireland, won the battle of Loch Léin (Lakes of Killarney) over the Éarainn, the Mairtine, and over Mogh Ruith (Mug Ruith?) s. Mo-Feibheas of Fir Bholg." (46.5, p. 210-11, LNG).

At 47.2 he wrote that Siorna mac Dian (Sírna Sáeglach), king of Ireland, won the battle of Móin Fhoichnigh among Uí Fhailghe (Kingdom of Uí Failghe) over the Mairtine and Éarainn. He states that among the tribes who pay "servile rent" were "Tuath Fhochmhuinn ... of Ui Fhailghe and over Fotharta (Fortúatha?) of Dairbhre (Kildorrery?) and Almhain (Bog of Allen/Hill of Allen) and Mairtine or Maidirdine." (50.7, pp. 217–17). At 51.8 he gives their territories as "Tuath Mhairtine in Múscraighe Miontaine (Múscraige) and in Oirthear Feimhin [=eastern Feimhean (see Slievenamon)] and Liag Tuaill and Liag Tí re and Aodha and Breóghain and in Ui Chairbre (see Uí Fidgenti)."

In the poem Sloindfead athachtuatha Ereann, which lists the vassal-tribes (see Déisi, or Attacotti?) of Ireland, MacFhirbhisigh relates that "the Mairtine over the middle of Munster/what of it is not remembered by all." (55.6, pp. 224–25). He likewise lists them among the Fir Bolg in the poem Gá lí on i bhFó dla Fir Bholg? (56.3, pp. 226–37)

== The Annals of the Four Masters ==
The Annals of the Four Masters date Conmael's reign of thirty years ending in Anno Mundi 3579.

These annals further state that Angus Olmucahda (Óengus Olmucaid), who died in Anno Mundi 3790, had defeated them in "the battle of Cuirce, the battle of Sliabh Cailge, against the Martini, in the territory of Corca Bhaiscinn." The territory of Corcu Baiscind lies within what is now County Clare.

== Kings ==
- Luath, Indell and Eoghan are listed as three sons of the king of the Mairtine of Munster in Acallamh na Senórach ("Luath & Indell & Eogan tri meic rig Mairtine Muman aníar.").
- Dáire Cerbba, a well known Munster dynast, ancestor of the Uí Fidgenti and Uí Liatháin, stated in the strange epic Forbhais Droma Dámhgháire to have been king of Medón Mairtine

== Metrical Dindshenchas ==
The Metrical Dindshenchas includes a passage which mentions "The three active Red Wolves of the Martine quenched the sturdy strength of the famous man: they took his head from him, whatever came of it." This may be a reference to Luath, Indell and Eoghan in Acallamh na Senórach .

== Notes ==
- Eoin MacNeill, "Early Irish Population Groups: their nomenclature, classification and chronology", in Proceedings of the Royal Irish Academy (C) 29 (1911): 59–114
- Michael A. O'Brien (ed.) with intro. by John V. Kelleher, Corpus genealogiarum Hiberniae. Dublin Institute for Advanced Studies. 1976.
- Dáibhí Ó Cróinín, "Ireland, 400-800", in Dáibhí Ó Cróinín (ed.), A New History of Ireland (Volume 1): Prehistoric and Early Ireland. Oxford University Press. 2005.
- Nollaig Ó Muraíle, Some Early Connacht Population Groups, in Seachas: Studies in Early and Medieval Irish Archaeology, History and Literature in Honour of Francis J. Byrne, ed. Alfred P. Smyth, Four Courts Press, Dublin, pp. 161–177, 2000. ISBN 1-85182-489-8.
- Seán Ó Duinn (ed. & trans.), Forbhais Droma Dámhgháire: The Siege of Knocklong. Cork: Mercier Press. 1992.
- T. F. O'Rahilly, Early Irish History and Mythology. Dublin Institute for Advanced Studies. 1946.
- Julius Pokorny, "Beiträge zur ältesten Geschichte Irlands (3. Érainn, Dári(n)ne und die Iverni und Darini des Ptolomäus)", in Zeitschrift für celtische Philologie 12 (1918): 323-57.

== Other resources ==
- Edmund Hogan, DOI: Onomasticon Goedelicum (M)
- Mumu by Dennis Walsh
