= Clanmorris =

Barony in County Mayo, Ireland

Clanmorris Clann Mhuiris (Irish)
- Barony
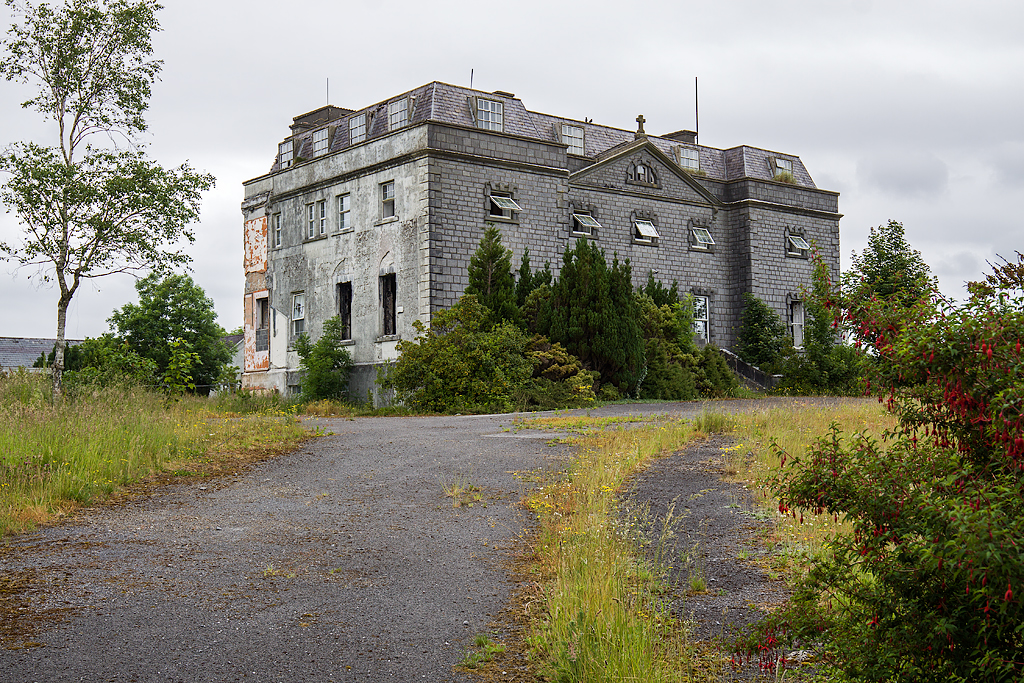
- Claremount House, Co. Mayo

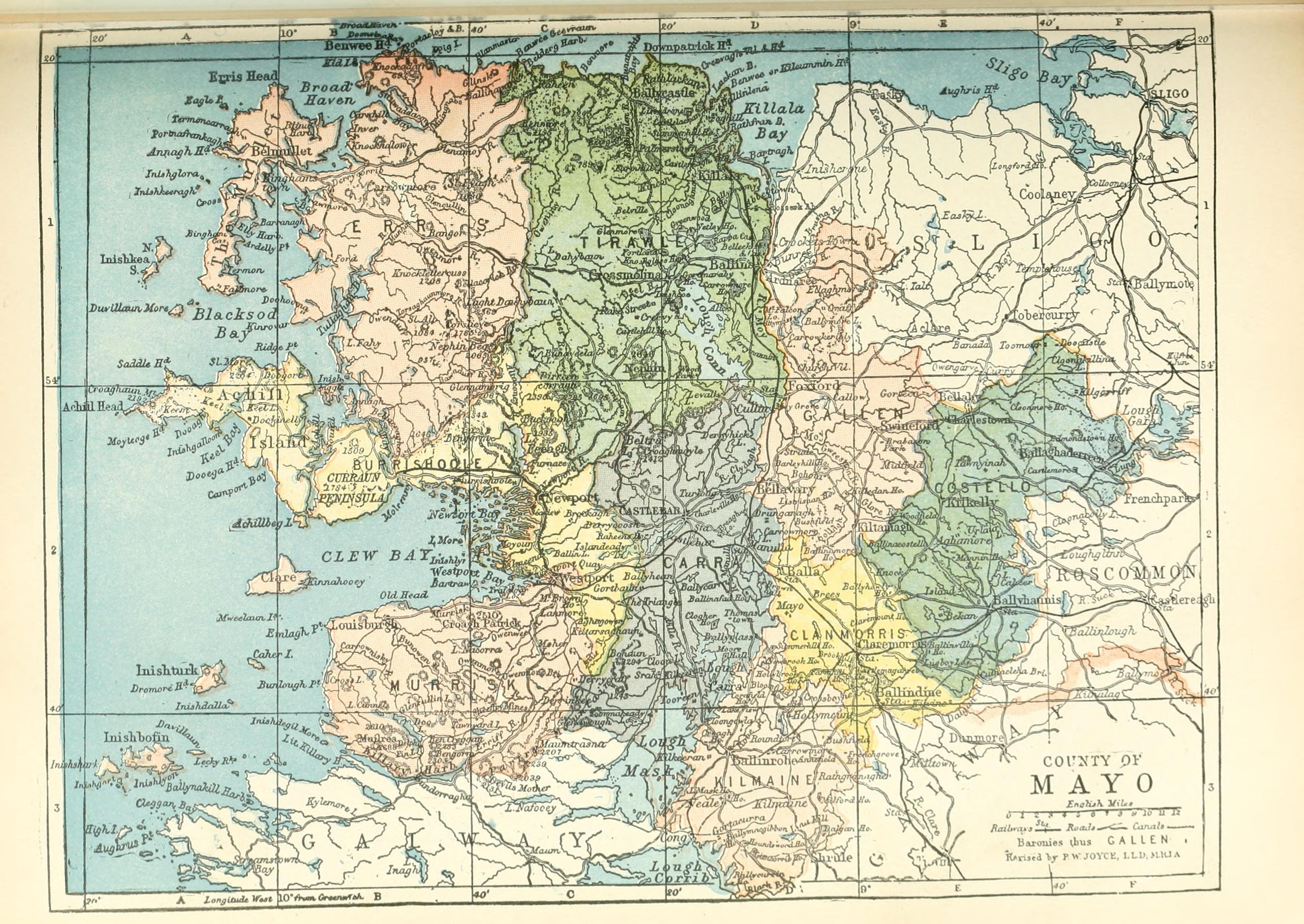
- Barony map of County Mayo, 1900; Clanmorris (yellow) is situated in the south.

- Location within Ireland
- Coordinates: 53°44′N 9°00′W
- Sovereign state: Ireland
- Province: Connacht
- County: Mayo

Area
  - Total: 280.3 km^{2} (108.2 sq mi)

The barony of Clanmorris is a barony in County Mayo, Ireland. It is also known as Crossboyne, and was formed from the Gaelic tuath of Conmaicne Cuile Tolad. It included the areas of Tir Nechtain and Tir Enna. The name Clanmorris derives from Maurice de Prendergast a Norman knight and his descendants the Fitz Maurice or McMorris family. The Baron Clanmorris title dates from 1800 when it was created for John Bingham.

== Parishes ==
The following are civil parishes within the barony of Clanmorris:

- Balla, originally part of Carra.
- Crossboyne
- Kilcolman
- Kilvine
- Mayo Abbey
- Tagheen

== Towns and villages ==
- Balla
- Claremorris
- Mayo Abbey
- Ballindine

== See also ==
- Conmaicne Cuile Tolad
