= Gíallchad =

Gíallchad, the son of Ailill Olcháin, son of Sírna Sáeglach, was, according to medieval Irish legend and historical tradition, the 37th High King of Ireland. Gíallchad took power after killing his predecessor, and the son of his grandfather's killer, Elim Olfínechta, in the battle of Comair Trí nUisce. He is said to have taken one out of every five men of Munster hostage. Gíallchad reigned for nine years, before being killed by Elim's son Art Imlech at Mag Muaide. The Lebor Gabála Érenn synchronises his reign with that of Phraortes of the Medes (665–633 BCE). The chronology of Geoffrey Keating's Foras Feasa ar Éirinn dates his reign to 786–777 BCE, that of the Annals of the Four Masters to 1023–1014 BCE.

Gíallchad's son was Nuadu Finn Fáil.

Preceded by Elim Olfínechta	High King of Ireland; LGE 7th century BCE; FFE 786–777 BCE; AFM 1023–1014 BCE	Succeeded by Art Imlech
