= Lóegaire mac Néill =

King of Ireland from 428-458

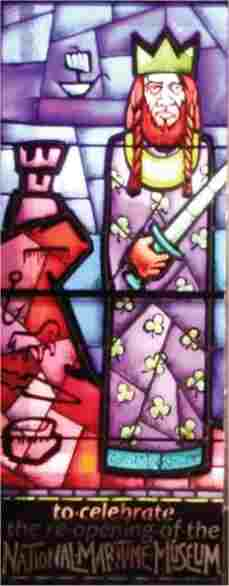
Ard Rí Lóegaire from a stained glass window in the National Maritime Museum

Lóegaire also Lóeguire, is said to have been a son of Niall of the Nine Hostages. The Irish annals and king lists include him as a King of Tara or High King of Ireland. He appears as an adversary of Saint Patrick in several hagiographies. His dealings with the saint were believed to account for his descendants' lack of importance in later times. There are several accounts of his death, all of which contain supernatural elements, some of which concern his wars against Leinster. His dates are uncertain as the sources are late. the 17th-century Annals of the Four Masters dates his reign to 428–458 AD. Modern historians generally place him in the second half of the fifth century.

== Sons of Niall ==
The Irish annals purport to record events in the fifth century, but their reliability is doubtful as such early entries were added in the ninth century or later. The chronology of the annals is particularly suspect as it is believed that this was created retrospectively to match what were believed to be the dates of Saint Patrick with the kings named by Patrick's earliest hagiographers, Muirchú moccu Mactheni and Tirechán. Both writers had Patrick come to Ireland in Lóegaire's reign and meet with him. Since the annals provided two death dates for Patrick, 461 and 493, Lóegaire's reign was made to fit these, and in general the earlier date. For the later date, Lóegaire's son Lugaid appears to have served the same adversary role.

In late prehistoric times, beginning in the fifth century, the ancestors of the Uí Néill—descendants of Niall of the Nine Hostages—expanded into the east midlands of Ireland, southern Ulster and northern Leinster, at the expense of the previous overlords. The record of the Irish annals, perhaps unreliable at such an early date, records war between the descendants of Niall and the Leinstermen. Although later associated with the conquests in the east midlands, Tirechán's life of Patrick may suggest that Lóegaire's power was centred in Connacht. Patrick is said to have met Lóegaire's daughters near Cruachan, a complex of prehistoric sites associated with the kingship of Connacht in legend and in history.

According to king lists, the earliest of which is dated on internal evidence to the reign of Fínsnechta Fledach (died 697), Niall was succeeded by Lóegaire, who was in turn followed by a second son of Niall, Coirpre, Coirpre by Ailill Molt, one of the few kings not descended from Niall, and Ailill by Lóegaire's son Lugaid. Later lists make Nath Í king between Niall and Lóegaire and also omit Coirpre. Given the many problems with the record, the dating of Lóegaire's floruit is imprecise, estimates placing it in the second half of the fifth century, c. 450 to perhaps the late 480s.

== Saint Patrick ==
In Muirchú moccu Mactheni's seventh century life of Patrick, Lóegaire is described as "a great king, fierce and pagan, emperor of the barbarians". After a number of attempts by Lóegaire and others to kill Patrick, Lóegaire is warned by the saint that he must accept the faith or die. Having taken the counsel of his people, he submits and is baptised.

The other early life of Patrick, by Tírechán, has it that Lóegaire remained a pagan in spite of Patrick's miracles. Lóegaire say that his father Niall would not have allowed him to convert. "Instead I am to be buried in the earthworks of Tara, I the son of Niall, face to face with the son of Dúnlaing in Mullaghmast". Tírechán, however, does allow that Patrick converts two of Lóegaire's daughters, Eithne the fair and Fedelm the red.

The later Vita tripartita Sancti Patricii (Tripartite Life of Saint Patrick) again portrays a Lóegaire who schemes to kill Patrick. The lorica of Saint Patrick appears in the Vita tripartita, and it protects Patrick from one of Lóegaire's schemes. In this account Lóegaire is not converted by Patrick, and is buried in the walls of Tara as his father Niall had wished. The Lebor na hUidre provides a further account of Lóegaire's conversion and death.

== Bóroma Laigen ==
The Bóroma or Bóroma Laigen—cattle tribute of Leinster—is the subject of a number of Middle Irish accounts. Its supposed origins are described in Tuathal Techtmar 7 Ríge na hÉrenn, part of a continuation of the Lebor Gabála Érenn, and in the Acallam na Senórach. They are placed in the prehistoric past, in the time of Túathal Techtmar, who imposes the tribute of 5000, in other accounts 15000, cattle on the kings of Leinster as the honour price—known as éraic in early Irish law codes—for the death of his daughters. The legendary kings who follow Tuathal attempt to collect the tribute until finally Coirpre Lifechair's attempt is defeated by the Fionn mac Cumhaill and the Fianna.

Lóegaire's attempts to impose the Bórama, according to the later accounts, were unsuccessful. His invasion was defeated by Crimthann mac Énnai, ancestor of the Uí Cheinnselaig, near the River Barrow. Lóegaire was captured and made to swear never again to invade Leinster. This he did, swearing by the sun and moon, earth and sea, day and night, and water and air. One account of his death has it that he broke this oath. It is likely that the association with the Uí Cheinnselaig is a later addition as other sources say that the king of Leinster who ruled from Naas in Patrick's time belonged to the later obscure kindred of Uí Garrchon, part of the Dál Messin Corb.

== Death ==
There are several accounts of Lóegaire's death. The Bóroma has him break his oath never again to invade Leinster. When he reaches the plain of the River Liffey near Kildare, the forces of nature on which he swore kill him: the wind leaves his lungs, the sun scorches him, the earth entombs him. Another account has Lóegaire's druids prophecy that he will die between Ériu (Ireland) and Alba (Scotland). To avoid this, Lóegaire never goes to sea. This version states that he died between two hills on the Liffey plain, hills named Ére and Alba. Finally, it is said that Lóegaire was cursed by Patrick and died of it.

== Cenél Lóegairi ==
Tiréchan's life of Patrick names two daughters of Lóegaire, Eithne the fair and Fedelm the red. Lóegaire's son Lugaid is included in all king lists. The account of Lóegaire and Patrick in An Leabhar Breac explains that Patrick cursed Lóegaire's descendants, saying that they would never hold the kingship of Tara. Lóegaire's queen, Angias, a daughter of (Ailill) Tassach, of the Uí Liatháin, who was pregnant with Lugaid, begged that her unborn child should be spared the curse, and this was granted in part so that Lugaid later became king. Another of his twelve sons is called Feidlimid. As well as Angias, his wives included Muirecht, daughter of Eochaid Muinremar, said to be the grandfather of Fergus Mór mac Eirc.

The Cenél Lóegairi were indeed a relatively minor group in the Irish midlands in historic times. They were subject to the Síl nÁedo Sláine kings of Brega. Their lands lay between the River Boyne and the Meath Blackwater with their main church at Trim in modern County Meath. Another branch the Muintir Talthligh, were chiefs of Uí Laoghaire of Lough Lir, a district which lay in the barony of Lurg, north of Lower Lough Erne in Fermanagh.
