= Finn mac Blatha =

Finn, son of Blath, son of Labraid Condelg, son of Cairpre, son of Ollom Fotla, was, according to medieval Irish legend and historical tradition, a High King of Ireland. He took power after he killed the previous High King, Eochu Apthach, whose disastrous year on the throne had been characterised by constant plague. He ruled for twenty, or twenty-two, or thirty years, depending on the source consulted, until he was killed by Sétna Innarraid, son of Bres Rí. The Lebor Gabála Érenn synchronises his reign with that of Darius the Great of Persia (522–485 BC). The chronology of Geoffrey Keating's Foras Feasa ar Éirinn dates his reign to 725–705 BC, that of the Annals of the Four Masters to 952–930 BC.

Preceded by Eochu Apthach	High King of Ireland; LGE 6th/5th century BC; FFE 725–705 BC; AFM 952–930 BC	Succeeded by Sétna Innarraid
