= Ailill Olcháin =

Ailill Olcháin (Olioll Olchain) is a legendary King of Ireland. He is the son of Sírna Sáeglach and father of Gíallchad. Although his father and his son are considered by medieval tradition to have been High Kings of Ireland, he is not listed in the usual synthetic lists of High Kings of Ireland.
