= Lehane =

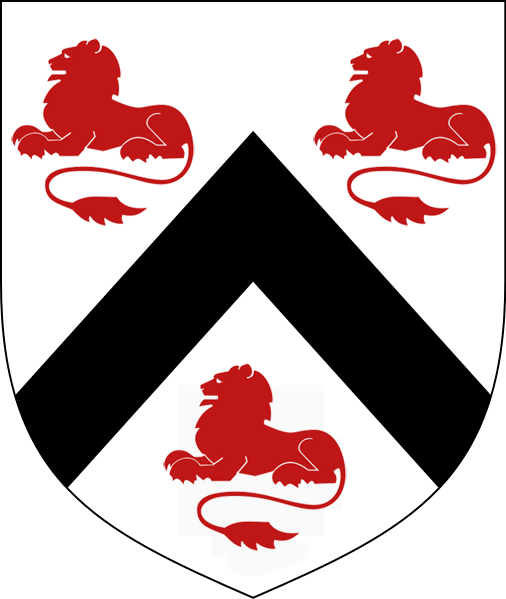
Ó Liatháin.

Lehane (Irish: Ó Liatháin) is an uncommon Irish surname, typically from County Cork. Ó Liatháin is more frequently anglicized as Lane or Lyons.

Most people with this surname derive from the ancient Munster kingdom of Uí Liatháin, which was powerful in the early to mid 1st millennium, and one of the few important Irish kingdoms to have colonies in Britain, documented in both Irish and Welsh sources (see Byrne 2001; Ó Corráin 2001). Later Uí Liatháin became politically marginalized when the Eóganachta, or more specifically the descendants of Conall Corc, came to power – although the rath they accepted from the new dynasty was the largest (Byrne 2001) – but remained relatively independent until disintegrating in the later Middle Ages.

Uí Liatháin was the sister kingdom of Uí Fidgenti, and thus its people share common ancestry with the O'Donovans, Ó Coileáins, and others. More distantly all are related to the historical Eóganachta in the stricter sense, if not by common origins in Ireland then at least by nearly two millennia of alliances and intermarriage.

The earliest documented ancestor of the Uí Liatháin and Uí Fidgenti is the 3rd or 4th century Dáre Cerbba (Dáire Cearba), otherwise known as Maine Munchaín.

== People ==
- Bruce Lehane, track and cross country coach
- Con Lehane (socialist)
- Dennis Lehane, author of Mystic River
- Faith Lehane, a character from Buffy the Vampire Slayer
- Jan Lehane, ex-tennis player.
- Jennifer Lehane (born 1998), Irish boxer
- Kevin Lehane, screenwriter of Grabbers
- Lesley Lehane, retired distance runner
- Patrick Lehane, Irish farmer and politician

== Companies ==
- Lehane, Mackenzie and Shand, former British civil engineering company

== See also ==
- Castlelyons
- Castlemartyr
- Cobh
- Crimthann mac Fidaig
- Mongfind
- Scoti
- Attacotti
- Mahoonagh
- O'Donovan
- List of Celtic tribes
- Kingdoms of Ireland
- Irish name
