= Ballydavock =

Ballydavock Baile Dhabhac
- Townland
- Location in Ireland
- Coordinates: 53°46′33″N 9°13′12″W
- Country: Ireland
- County: County Mayo
- Parish: Drum

Ballydavock (from Irish Baile Dhabhac) is a townland in the civil parish of Drum, County Mayo, Ireland. It lies in the Roman Catholic parish of Drum and barony of Carra.
