= Angias =

Angias or Angas, daughter of Ailill Tassach, son of Eochu Liathán, was the wife of Lóegaire mac Néill, High King of Ireland, and mother of Lugaid mac Lóegairi, who later became High King.

Her brother was Bressal mac Ailello, a possible King of Munster. Their dynastic kindred, known as the Uí Liatháin, ruled over a kingdom on the southern Irish coast, and were also very active in British affairs.

Angias features in the Vita tripartita Sancti Patricii, in which she beseeches Saint Patrick to allow her unborn son to one day become High King of Ireland.

== Sources ==
- Anne Connon, "A Prosopography of the Early Queens of Tara", in Edel Bhreathnach (ed.), The Kingship and Landscape of Tara. Dublin: Four Courts Press for The Discovery Programme. 2005. pp. 225–327
- Whitley Stokes (ed. & tr.). The Tripartite Life of Patrick. London: Eyre and Spottiswoode for Her Majesty's Stationery Office. 1887.
