= Ballymacrah =

Townland near Castlebar, County Mayo, Ireland

Coordinates: 53°50′10″N 9°20′16″W

Ballymacrah (Irish: Baile Mhic Craith, meaning 'town[land] of Mac Craith') is a townland in the electoral division of Castlebar Rural and the barony of Carra, County Mayo. The townland is southwest of Castlebar and borders Ballynaboll South, Cloondeash, Derrinlevaun & Knockaphunta to the east, Derrycoosh to the south, Pheasanthill to the west and Ballynaboll North to the north. The townland, which is approximately 1.6 square kilometres (0.6 sq mi) in area, had a population of 58 people in 24 occupied dwellings in 2011.
