= Lugaid mac Lóegairi =

Lugaid mac Lóegairi (died c. 507) was a High King of Ireland. He was a grandson of Niall of the Nine Hostages.

One of the supposed twelve sons of Lóegaire mac Néill, his mother was Angias, a daughter of (Ailill) Tassach of the Uí Liatháin. Compared to his father, who features prominently in hagiographies of Saint Patrick, Lugaid is a lesser figure.

Before he was born Patrick is said by the late Vita tripartita Sancti Patricii to have cursed Lóegaire's descendants so that they would never enjoy the kingship. His mother, who is said to have been pregnant with Lugaid at the time, beseeched Patrick to lift the curse from her unborn son. This he did, supposedly saying: "Until he opposes me, I will not curse him."

According to the earliest king list, that in the Baile Chuind Chétchathaig, compiled in the reign of Fínsnechta Fledach (died c. 695), Lugaid was king after Ailill Molt. Some of the late Irish annals record that he was part of an alliance that defeated and killed Ailill, but the more reliable Annals of Ulster report only his death in 507, perhaps at the battle of Ard Corainn. His apparent inactivity while the annals are full of the doings of his kinsmen Coirpre mac Néill and of Muirchertach Macc Ercae is a puzzle.

According to the Vita tripartita, Lugaid was killed by a bolt from the heavens when he mocked Patrick at a place later called Achad Forchai. Allowing that the association with Saint Patrick is not original, it is thought that this account preserves a memory of some tale involving Lugaid's death by lightning, making him one of several early Irish kings, among whom his father, who were perhaps believed to have died by supernatural means. The Annals of the Four Masters quote a late poem in their report of Lugaid's death: "At Achadh Farcha warlike,/ the death of Laeghaire's son, Lughaidh occurred,/ Without praise in heaven or here,/ a heavy flash of lightning smote him."

According to the king lists, Lugaid was succeeded by Muirchertach Macc Ercae.
