= Rothechtaid Rotha =

Rothechtaid Rotha, son of Róán, son of Failbe, son of Cas Cétchaingnech, son of Faildergdóit, was, according to medieval Irish legend and historical tradition, a king of the eastern midland kingdom of the Gailenga who became High King of Ireland after defeating his predecessor, Sírna Sáeglach, in the battle of Alind. He was the first Irish king to use a four-horse chariot, which he had made for his queen. He ruled for seven years, until he was struck by lightning at Dunseverick, County Antrim. He was succeeded by his son Elim Olfínechta. The Lebor Gabála Érenn synchronises his reign with that of Phraortes of the Medes (665-633 BC). The chronology of Geoffrey Keating's Foras Feasa ar Éirinn dates his reign to 794–787 BC, that of the Annals of the Four Masters to 1031–1024 BC.

Preceded by Sírna Sáeglach	High King of Ireland; LGE 7th century BC; FFE 794–787 BC; AFM 1031–1024 BC	Succeeded by Elim Olfínechta
