= Bressal mac Ailello =

5th-century Irish monarch

Bressal mac Ailello Thassaig was an early king of the Uí Liatháin who may also have been King of Munster. His sister, Angias, was the Queen of Lóegaire mac Néill, High King of Ireland.

He was the son of Ailill Tassach, ancestor of the Uí Thassaig, an important sept of the Uí Liatháin.
