= Nuadu Finn Fáil =

Nuadu Finn Fáil (Nuadu the Fair of Fál - a poetic name for Ireland), son of Gíallchad, was, according to medieval Irish legend and historical tradition, a High King of Ireland, who took power after he killed his predecessor, and his father's killer, Art Imlech. The Lebor Gabála Érenn says he ruled for either sixty or forty years (Geoffrey Keating says twenty, the Four Masters forty) before being killed by Art's son Bres Rí. The Lebor Gabála synchronises his reign with that of Cyaxares of the Medes (625–585 BC). The chronology of Keating's Foras Feasa ar Éirinn dates his reign to 755–735 BC, that of the Annals of the Four Masters to 1002–962 BC.

== Genealogy ==
Nuadu Finn Fáil was fathered by Gíallchad, whose father was Oilill Olchaoin. His son was Áedan Glas, whose son was Siomón Brecc mac Aedan. In turn, Siomón's son was Muiredach Bolgrach.

Preceded by Art Imlech	High King of Ireland; LGE 7th/6th century BC; FFE 755–735 BC; AFM 1002–962 BC	Succeeded by Bres Rí
