= Ferdomnach =

Irish illustrator

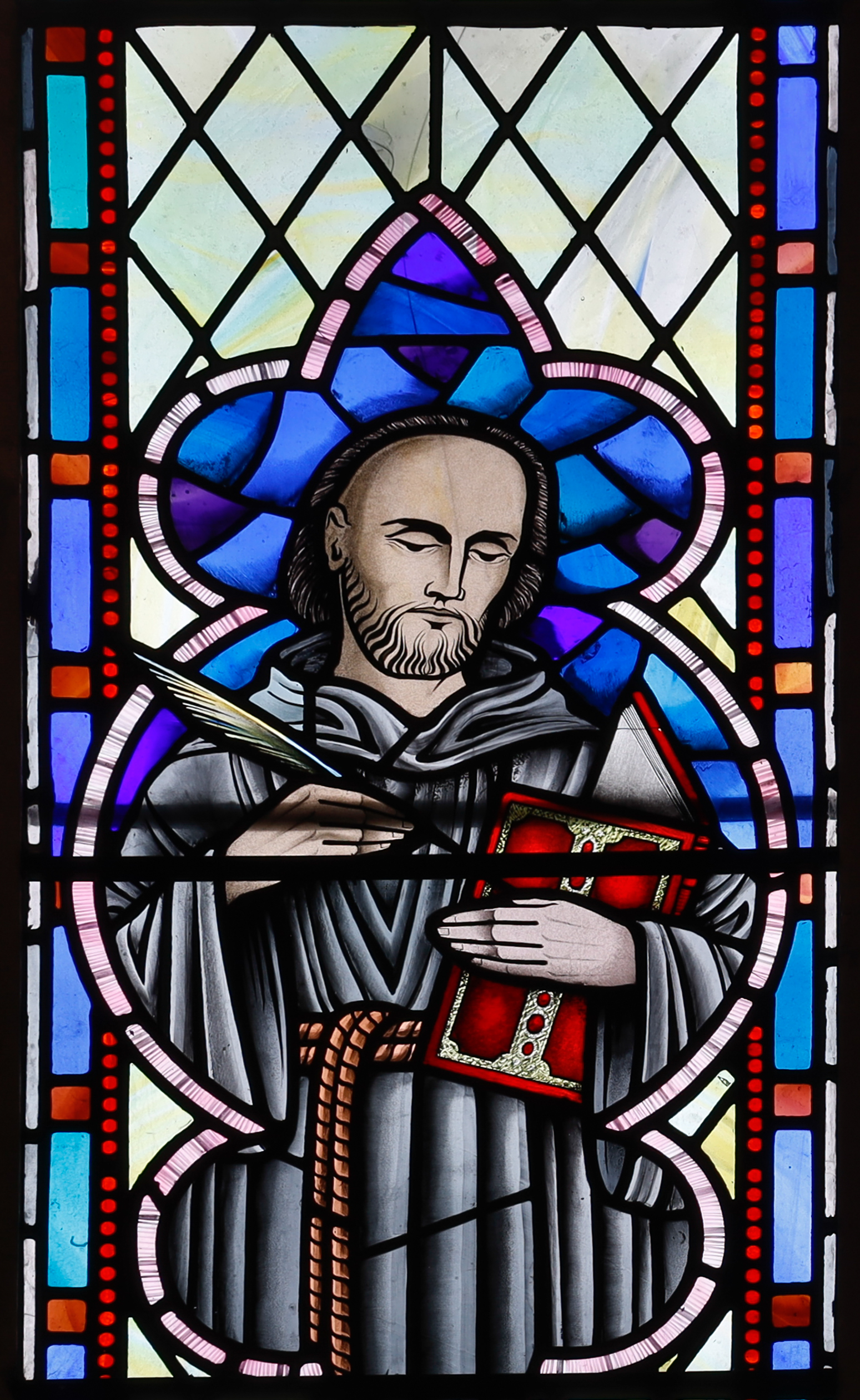
Stained glass window in the sanctuary of St. Patrick's Cathedral in Armagh, depicting Ferdomnach

Ferdomnach (died 846) was an Irish illuminator who is responsible for the Book of Armagh.

The Annals of the Four Masters recorded the death of Ferdomnach as a sage and choice scribe of the Church of Armagh. His creation, the Book of Armagh is held at Trinity College, Dublin, and contains some of the oldest surviving specimens of Old Irish. The book often equals and even surpasses the delicate precision of the Book of Kells.
