= Book of Armagh =

9th-century Irish New Testament copy

- Codex Ardmachanus
- Also known as: Liber Ar(d)machanus (Book of Armagh), Canoin Phatraic (Canon of Patrick)
- Ascribed to: Ferdomnach of Armagh, St Patrick, Sulpicius Severus and others
- Language: Latin, Old Irish
- Date: 9th century
- State of existence: Incomplete
- Manuscript(s): TCD MS 52
- Length: 222 folios (folios 1 and 41-44 are missing)

The Book of Armagh or Codex Ardmachanus (ar or 61) (Irish: Leabhar Ard Mhacha), also known as the Canon of Patrick and the Liber Ar(d)machanus, is a 9th-century Irish illuminated manuscript written mainly in Latin. It is held by the Library of Trinity College Dublin (MS 52). The document is valuable for containing early texts relating to St Patrick, the 7th century Irish bishop Tírechán, the Irish monk Muirchú.

The book contains some of the oldest surviving specimens of Old Irish and for being one of the earliest manuscripts produced by an insular church to contain a near complete copy of the New Testament.

== History ==
The manuscript was once reputed to have belonged to St. Patrick and, at least in part, to be a product of his hand. Research has determined, however, that the earliest part of the manuscript was the work of a scribe named Ferdomnach of Armagh (died 845 or 846). Ferdomnach wrote the first part of the book in 807 or 808, for Patrick's heir (comarba) Torbach, abbot of Armagh. Two other scribes are known to have assisted him.

The people of medieval Ireland placed a great value on this manuscript. Along with the Bachal Isu, or Staff of Jesus, it was one of the two symbols of the office for the Archbishop of Armagh. The custodianship of the book was an important office that eventually became hereditary in the MacMoyre family. It remained in the hands of the MacMoyre family in the townland of Ballymoyer near Whitecross, County Armagh until the late 17th century. Its last hereditary keeper was Florence MacMoyer. By 1707 it was in the possession of the Brownlow family of Lurgan. It remained in the Brownlow family until 1853 when it was sold to the Irish antiquary, Dr William Reeves. In 1853, Reeves sold the Book to John George de la Poer Beresford, Archbishop of Armagh, who presented it to Trinity College, Dublin, where it can be read online from the Digital Collections portal of the Trinity College library.

== Manuscript ==
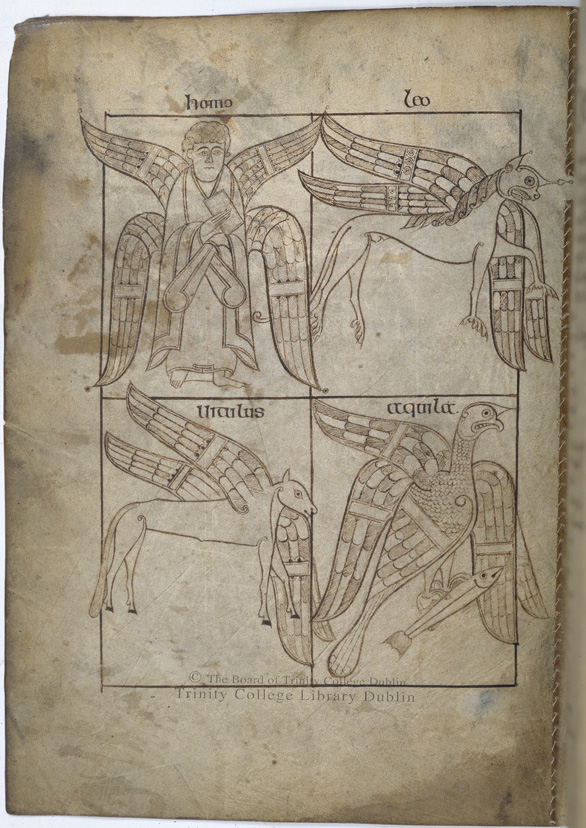
Folio 32v with symbols of the Evangelists

The book measures 195 by 145 by 75 millimetres (7.7 by 5.7 by 3.0 in). The book originally consisted of 222 folios of vellum, of which 5 are missing. The text is written in two columns in a fine pointed insular minuscule. The manuscript contains four miniatures, one each of the four Evangelists' symbols. Some of the letters have been colored red, yellow, green, or black. The manuscript is associated with a tooled-leather satchel, believed to date from the fifteenth century.

It contains text of Vulgate, but there are many Vetus Latina readings in the Acts and Pauline epistles.

== Additional pages ==
Book of Armagh page S-17
Book of Armagh page S-155

== Illumination ==
The manuscript has three full-page drawings, and a number of decorated initials in typical Insular style. Folio 32v shows the four Evangelists' symbols in compartments in ink, the eagle of John resembling that of the Book of Dimma. Elsewhere yellow, red, blue and green are used.

== Dating ==
The dating of the manuscript goes back to Rev. Charles Graves, who deciphered in 1846 from partially erased colophons the name of the scribe Ferdomnach and the bishop Torbach who ordered the Book. According to the Annals of the Four Masters Torbach died in 808 and Ferdomnach in 847. As Torbach became bishop in 807 and died in 808 the manuscript must have been written around this time. Unfortunately to make the writing better visible Graves used a chemical solution and this had the effect that the writing related to the scribe and bishop is not readable any more.

== Contents ==
The manuscript can be divided into three parts:

=== Texts relating to St Patrick ===
The first part contains important early texts relating to St. Patrick. These include two Lives of St. Patrick, one by Muirchu Maccu Machteni and one by Tírechán. Both texts were originally written in the 7th century. The manuscript also includes other miscellaneous works about St. Patrick, including the Liber Angueli (or the Book of the Angel), in which St. Patrick is given the primatial rights and prerogatives of Armagh by an angel. Some of these texts are in Old Irish and are the earliest surviving continuous prose narratives in that language. The only old Irish texts of greater age are fragmentary glosses found in manuscripts on the continent.

- Muirchu, Vita sancti Patricii
- Tírechán, Collectanea
- notulae in Latin and Irish on St. Patrick's acts, and additamenta, charter-like documents later inserted into the manuscript
- Liber Angeli ('The Book of the Angel') (640 x 670), written in Ferdomnach's hand
- St. Patrick, Confessio in abbreviated form

=== New Testament material ===
The manuscript also includes significant portions of the New Testament, based on the Vulgate, but with variations characteristic of insular texts. In addition, prefatory matter including prefaces to Paul's Epistles (most of which are by Pelagius), the Canon Tables of Eusebius, and the Letter of Jerome to Pope Damasus are included.

=== Life of St Martin ===
The manuscript closes with the Life of St. Martin of Tours by Sulpicius Severus.

== Sources ==
- O'Neill, Timothy. The Irish Hand: Scribes and Their Manuscripts From the Earliest Times. Cork: Cork University Press, 2014. ISBN 978-1-7820-5092-6
- Sharpe, Richard (1982). "Palaeographical Considerations in the Study of the Patrician Documents in the Book of Armagh". Scriptorium. 36: 3–28. doi:10.3406/scrip.1982.1240.
