= Senchas Fagbála Caisil =

Early medieval Irish text

Senchas Fagbála Caisil "The Story of the Finding of Cashel" is an early medieval Irish text which relates, in two variants, the origin legend of the kingship of Cashel. Myles Dillon has dated the first variant (§§ 1-3) to the 8th century, and the second (§§ 4-8) tentatively to the 10th century.

== Witnesses ==
The text survives only in Dublin, Trinity College, H.3.17: V, pp. 768–73. The Lebor na Cert ("Book of Rights") briefly refers to the story.

== Summary ==
§§ 1-3. Duirdriu, swineherd of the king of Éile, and Cuirirán, swineherd of the king of the Múscraige, were masting their pigs in the woods of Cashel when they fell asleep and experienced a vision in which they saw an angel blessing the first king of Cashel, Conall Corc mac Luigdech, and the line of Éoganacht kings of Munster which sprang from him. Having recounted the vision to his king, Conall mac Nenta Con, Duirdriu obtained the land at Cashel and sold it to Conall Corc. That would have been why the Uí Duirdrenn, Duirdriu's descendants, were entitled to seven cumala from the king of Cashel. Then follows a list of kings from Conall Corc to Dub Lachtna (ninth century) as well as a rhetoric called Dicta Cuirirán Muiceda "The Sayings of Cuirirán the Swineherd".

§§ 4-8. When one night the two swineherds stayed at Clais Duirdrenn, north of Cashel, they experienced a prophetic vision, in which they witnessed Saint Patrick's arrival in Ireland. The following night, they had a second vision in which they enjoyed a magnificent feast and an angel announced that the first person to light a fire on Cashel would obtain the kingship of Munster. Cuirirán recounted his vision to Conall Corc, son of the king of Munster, who hastened to light a fire at Dún Cuirc in Cashel. There he organised a lavish feast, the first to be held at Cashel. On Corc's request, the swineherds went to their kings to invite them to the feast. At Fíad Duma in Muiceda, Conall, king of the Éile, heard the story from Druidriu [now in place of Duirdriu], which was confirmed by the king's druids, however much to his displeasure. The land belonged to his kingdom and so Conall marched south to Cashel. However, on arrival, Conall was welcomed to the feast and on his request, Druidriu gave the angelic blessing to Corc and proclaimed him king of Munster, for which Corc richly rewarded the swineherd. From that time onwards, the Uí Druidrenn were to proclaim every new king of Cashel, for which they were entitled to a reward of seven cumala. Moreover, the blessing would protect the kings of Cashel against violent deaths unless they neglected to uphold truth and justice (cf: fír flathemon). The text goes on to say that this took place sixty years before the baptism of Óengus mac Nad Froích, king of Munster, by Saint Patrick, according to scholarly calculations, and that Óengus imposed the tri-annual "Tribute of Patrick’s Baptism" on the Munstermen, which was levied until the reign of King Cormac.
