= Dunlea =

Dunlea is a surname. Notable people with the surname include:

- Craig Dunlea (born 1976), rugby union player
- Lynn Dunlea (born 1974), camogie player
- Stephanie Dunlea, camogie player
- Thomas Dunlea (1894–1970), Irish-Australian Catholic priest

== See also ==
- Dunlea Centre
- Dunlea v Attorney-General, 2000 New Zealand lawsuit
