= Bres Rí =

Bres Rí (Bres the King), son of Art Imlech, was, according to medieval Irish legend and historical tradition, a High King of Ireland, who took power after killing his predecessor, and his father's killer, Nuadu Finn Fáil. He ruled for nine years, and fought many battles against the Fomorians, before he was killed at Carn Conluain by Eochu Apthach. The Lebor Gabála Érenn synchronises his reign with those of Nebuchadrezzar II of Babylon (605–562), Cambyses II of Persia (died 522 BC), and Cyaxares of the Medes (625–585). The chronology of Geoffrey Keating's Foras Feasa ar Éirinn dates his reign to 735–726 BC, that of the Annals of the Four Masters to 962–953 BC.

Preceded by Nuadu Finn Fáil	High King of Ireland; LGE 7th/6th century BC; FFE 735–726 BC; AFM 962–953 BC	Succeeded by Eochu Apthach
