= Art Imlech =

Art Imlech, ("having an edge or border" or "bordering on a lake or marsh") son of Elim Olfínechta, was, according to medieval Irish legend and historical tradition, a High King of Ireland, who took power after killing his predecessor, and his father's killer, Gíallchad. He is said to have dug seven forts in a reign that lasted twelve or twenty-two years, before he was killed in battle by Gíallchad's son Nuadu Finn Fáil. The Lebor Gabála Érenn synchronises his reign with those of Phraortes (665–633 BC) and Cyaxares (625–585) of the Medes. The chronology of Geoffrey Keating's Foras Feasa ar Éirinn dates his reign to 777–755 BC, that of the Annals of the Four Masters to 1014–1002 BC.

| Preceded by Gíallchad | High King of Ireland; LGE 7th/6th century BC; FFE 777–755 BC; AFM 1014–1002 BC | Succeeded by Nuadu Finn Fáil |
