= Conmaicne Cuile =

Early people of Ireland

The Conmaicne Cúile or Conmaicne Cuile Tolad were an early people of Ireland. Their tuath comprised, at minimum, most of the barony of Kilmaine, in County Mayo.

== Origin ==
The Conmaicne (or Modern Conmhaicne) were a people of early Ireland, perhaps related to the Laigin, who dispersed to various parts of Ireland. They settled in Connacht and Longford, giving their name to several Conmaicne territories. Other branches of Conmaicne were located in County Galway, Roscommon, Mayo, and Leitrim.

Ruaidhrí Ó Flaithbheartaigh linked "Cúile" with Cullagh townland ("An Choilleach", the woods). Maigh Tuireadh ("Moytura") is where the 1st battle of Moytura was fought.. Some Latin texts reference them as "Conmacgneculy" and "Conmacniculy".

== Territory ==
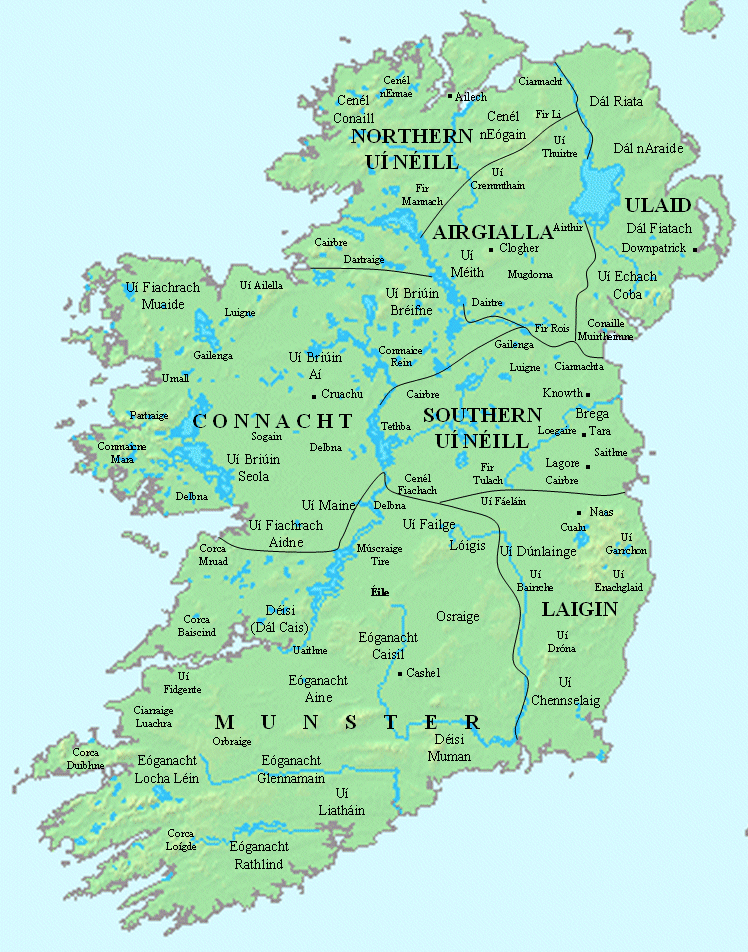
Early peoples and kingdoms of Ireland, c.800

Knox said their territory comprised the baronies Ross and much of Kilmaine (except parts east, and north of the River Robe). East Kilmaine was occupied by the Muinter Crechain. To the north was "Maigh Ceara", now the barony of Carra, County Mayo.

The alternative name for the barony of Kilmaine, Coolagh, probably reflects the ancient population group named Conmaicne Cuile. Their territory was bounded by lakes, and native Irish forests in places.

== Septs ==
The chief Conmaicne Cuile family was Ó Talcharain. The primary septs were:-

- Ó Talcharain, Ó Talcharan.
- Ó Morann (Moran)
- Ó Martain (Martin or Martins)

Conmaicne Cuile Tolad was invaded by Anglo-Normans about the middle of the thirteenth century, and granted to Maurice Fitzgerald. Another deed calls the district the cantred of 'Keneloch', probably Kinlough north-east of Moyne, a chief manor of the area. In later times the Burkes controlled the territory.

== Patrican churches ==
In the original Vita tripartita Sancti Patricii, Tírechán said Saint Patrick travelled through Conmaicne Dúin Móir to Conmaicne Cuile Tolad and established Christian churches here. Knox identified these new churches as Kilmaine-beg, Shrule, and perhaps the Church of Cross. Earlier Patrician churches already existed at Kilmainemore, Kilbennan, Donaghpatrick, and perhaps Templepatrick at "Inchanguill".

== See also ==
- Conmhaicne
- Cath Maige Tuired
