= Óengus Bolg =

Óengus Bolg, son of Lugaid, son of Mac Nia, son of Mac Con, son (or descendant) of Lugaid Loígde, son of Dáire Doimthech, was a king of the Corcu Loígde, and an ancestor of the Eóganachta "inner circle" through his daughter Aimend, married to Conall Corc. This serves to legitimize the coming rule of the Eóganachta in Munster, still ruled by the powerful Dáirine, of whom the Corcu Loígde are the sovereign royal sept.

The ruling sept of Corcu Loígde during the later Middle Ages, the Uí Builc, took their name from him. They later became known as the O'Driscolls.

== Mythology ==
T. F. O'Rahilly believed Óengus Bolg is unhistorical and simply another emanation of the hypothetical Érainn ancestor deity Bolg. Thus, according to O'Rahilly, he is present to divinely represent the Érainn in a marriage to the Eóganachta.
