= Maine (given name) =

Maine is a given name. Notable people with the name include:

- Maine mac Cerbaill (died 537), Irish king
- Maine mac Néill (died 712), Irish king
- Maine Mór, Irish founder of the kingdom of Uí Maine
- Maine Munchaín, Irish dynast
- Maine de Biran (1766–1824), French philosopher
- Maine Mendoza (born 1995), Filipina comedian, actress and model

== Fictional characters ==
- Maine (メイン), a fictional character and veteran edgerunner (veteran mercenary) in the original net animated (ONA) miniseries Cyberpunk: Edgerunners, based on the action role-playing game Cyberpunk 2077
