= Elim Olfínechta =

Elim Olfínechta, son of Rothechtaid Rotha, was, according to medieval Irish legend and historical tradition, a High King of Ireland. He succeeded to the throne after his father was struck by lightning. Snow that tasted of wine (Old Irish oll, "great, ample", fín, "wine", snechta, "snow") is said to have fallen in his reign. He ruled for only one year, before he was killed by Gíallchad, grandson of Sírna Sáeglach, the High King who had been overthrown by Elim's father. The Lebor Gabála Érenn synchronises his reign with that of Phraortes of the Medes (665-633 BCE). The chronology of Geoffrey Keating's Foras Feasa ar Éirinn dates his reign to 787–786 BCE, that of the Annals of the Four Masters to 1024–1023 BCE.

Preceded by Rothechtaid Rotha	High King of Ireland; LGE 7th century BCE; FFE 787–786 BCE; AFM 1024–1023 BCE	Succeeded by Gíallchad
