= Muirchú moccu Machtheni =

Irish hagiographer

Muirchú moccu Machtheni (Latin: Maccutinus), usually known simply as Muirchú, (born sometime in the seventh century) was a monk and historian from Leinster. He wrote the Vita sancti Patricii, known in English as The Life of Saint Patrick, one of the first accounts of the fifth-century saint, and which credits Patrick with the conversion of Ireland in advance of the spread of monasticism. This work was dedicated to Bishop Aedh of Slébte, who was also the one who suggested the biography be written, and was the patron for the work. Muirchú's work is of little historical value in relation to the distant fifth century, but is a useful source for the time in which he lived and how Patrick was viewed in the seventh century.

== Life ==
Muirchú was possibly a member of the Tuath Mochtaine clan, who resided on Mag Macha, the Armagh plain. Ludwig Bieler believes this can be seen through Muirchú's recorded last name, Machtheni. Muirchú, along with Bishop Aedh, is recorded to have been among the ecclesiastics who attended the Synod of Birr in 697 A.D. Their attendance at the Synod suggests that the two were concerned with the unification of the two churches in Ireland, the southern and northern churches, Romani and the Hibernenses, who had various differing customs and some opposing ideas on religious matters.

== The Vita sancti Patricii ==
Muirchú's Vita sancti Patricii only survives in four copies, none of which are complete versions, and some of which are only fragments. There are three partial versions of the Vita that survive in Europe and one in Ireland. The incomplete copy in Library at Novara (Cap 77) was copied sometime in the thirteenth century, another incomplete copy at Bibliothèque Royal in Brussels (Reg.64) appears to have been copied in the 11th century, and the two fragments at the Nationalbibliothek (Ser. Nov 3642) in Vienna are recorded in insular Anglo-Saxon script dating to the later eighth century. The version that survived in Ireland was contained within a manuscript called The Book of Armagh (Dublin, Trinity College, Ms.52), which contains most important later traditions about Patrick and dates from the second half of the seventh century. The biography about Saint Patrick written by Muirchú is just one of many documents relating to Saint Patrick contained within this book. The manuscript was copied in the year 807, shortly after the Vita Patricii was written, and is likely the most authentic version. However, due to the incompleteness of all four surviving copies, scholars have found it difficult to piece together a comprehensible version of the Vita.

We can summarise from what is written in Muirchu's prologue to the Vita that it was the Bishop of Sletty, Aedh, who encouraged Muirchú to write, eventually commissioning and sponsoring the writing of the manuscript. Muirchú also informs his readers in the prologue that nobody else had attempted to write a similar kind of text except for his father Cogitosus. The term used is that Cogitosus was his “father,” but it is generally agreed upon by scholars that this was a figurative term, meaning spiritual father or spiritual companion. Muirchú is most certainly referring to the same Cogitosus who wrote a hagiographical Life of St. Bridget in the earlier seventh century. If Muirchú is to be believed, this would make him one of the earliest Irish hagiographers of any saint, second to Cogitosus.

Muirchú's written sources for his writings included Patrick's own Confessio and Epistola. The first part of the Vita is certainly based on the Confessio, and on a narrative of Saint Patrick's stay in Gaul. Following the pre-Christian tradition of oral teachings and storytelling, Muirchú likely got information from some oral traditions as well. Muirchú also mentions that he used material composed by Bishop Ultán. Muirchú was aware that his sources might not always be reliable, as he was writing fairly long after Patrick's death, but made an attempt to tell the story of Patrick's life as best he could with the available sources. The Vita is a hagiography, written to tell the life story of a Saint, but also including events that may have simply been added to make the Saint seem more impressive. Muirchú writes in a more fluent style than Patrick had in his works, which were notably written in what was considered bad Latin, but not as polished as Cogitosus’ Latin. This is not to say with certainty that Muirchú was less educated, because there is a slight possibility that the Book of Armagh did not reproduce the Vita Patricii properly. Latin was almost always the second language of Irish monks unless they came from outside Ireland, so the discrepancies between the three authors could also be contributed to this. Muirchú is also seen to quote books other than the bible, including classical authors such as Virgil and Sedulius, again alluding to the fact that he was clearly very well educated by monastic standards.

== The Vita sancti Patricii as a work of literature ==
Many scholars argue that the Vita sancti Patricii should be seen as a piece of literature, usually falling into the category of hagiography. This is often attributed to the contrast between Patrick's own writings and Muirchú's, because there are parts that vary to a fair degree. The beginning of the Vita generally follows along the same lines as Patrick's accounts of his life, but after the scenes where Patrick escapes from Ireland and returns to Britain, it takes a different turn. Muirchú added on to Patrick's outline of his life, stating that the Saint, after he left Britain for the second time, intended to travel to Rome but instead stayed with Germanus in Auxerre for many years, and it was in Auxerre that he heard of the mission to convert Ireland and decided to return. The lack of evidence in Patrick's writings for certain events that take place in the Vita indicates Muirchú's was enhancing Patrick's life and adding new events to make Patrick's tale seem more impressive. Similar to a piece of literature, the Vita Patricii contains two climaxes, suggesting that Muirchú added these for dramatic effect. Muirchú also uses an interesting stylistic device in which he places the current event he is discussing in between two biblical quotes. This is to mark the beginning and end of passages within the Vita.

The frequent appearance of miracles in the Vita also attests to its classification as a piece of literature, in the form of hagiography. There are several incidents in which Patrick is seen to have a miraculous or divine nature. One particular episode in which Saint Patrick drinks from a poisoned cup but is unharmed, shows him to be almost supernatural and above death. The inspiration for this type of event is Biblical, from the end of Mark's gospel, and demonstrates Muirchú's in-depth knowledge of the biblical stories. Patrick is also seen as being able to raise the dead in the Vita, which gives him a miraculous, Christ-like quality. In these events Patrick is portrayed as a kind of medieval superhero and saint who could perform miracles and challenge evil forces. Patrick's dedication to converting pagan Ireland is seen through many events in the Vita, and this dedication was no doubt shared by all monastics, Muirchú included. Muirchú's desires for a solely Christian Ireland are compatible with Patrick's and appear to be integrated into his portrayal of the character of Patrick.

== Vita sancti Patricii and the Church of Armagh ==
The second half of the seventh century say an outburst of literary activity related to Patrick. Alongside Muirchú's Vita Patricii we have Tírechán's near contemporaneous Collectanea as well as other works such as the Liber Angeli. These are preserved in the Book of Armagh. These texts, and particularly Muirchú's Vita Patricii, are often thought to have been written to promote the ambitions of Armagh as the prime church in Ireland. Armagh held a powerful position in the Irish church from the early Middle Ages onward. There are no sources earlier than Muirchú and Tírechán's works that suggest Patrick had a special connection with Armagh. This goal of making Armagh head of the church is evident throughout the entire Vita, where numerous references are made to Armagh. Most scholars agree that this was an attempt to compete with Cogitosus and his attempts to establish Kildare as head of the church. Cogitosus had written a Vita Brigitae, much in the same style as Muirchú's Vita where he had claimed that Kildare (through Brigit) was the head church in Ireland. Hagiographies were often used to contest supremacy for their separate churches. According to Muirchú, Patrick founded his main church at Armagh, and stated in his work that Armagh was beloved by Patrick. In the Vita, Muirchú writes that Patrick intended to die in Armagh, and though an angel convinced him not to specifically go there, the angel stated that Patrick's ‘pre-eminence’ would be at Armagh.

Monastics were eager to crush any connections to pre-Christian pagan religions, and Armagh was home to various important pre-Christian sites. Foremost, Armagh was located close to the important pre-Christian site, Emain Macha (The Twins of Macha), a place steeped in mythological lore and associated with the goddess, or figure of Macha. By establishing Armagh as head of the church, it was an attempt to replace and reclaim the land from this, and any other pagan associations.

Hughes’ Early Christian Ireland notes that Patrick set up his church in Ulster, a province that still must have spread over much of Northern Ireland, and contained Armagh. Bishop Aedh, the patron of the Vita, was originally from the Irish midlands but had moved to Armagh. Bishop Aedh had then merged his church with the Paruchia Patricii (the confederation of Patrician churches) in Armagh anytime from 661 to 668. Aedh as patron of the Vita must have had some say in what underlying messages were written into the Vita, and Muirchú's companionship with Aedh could have led him to want to help establish Armagh as an important center. Hughes also believes that Muirchú presents Patrick not only as the founder of a church in Ulster but as a missionary, who was accepted by the Ui Néill, the dominant power in Northern Ireland in Muirchú's time. That being said, in the Vita, Muirchú confines Patrick's activities to the north-east of Ireland, and more specifically, in the second part of the Vita, his activities are mainly confined to the province of Ulster.

== Using the Vita sancti Patricii to encourage conversion ==
Another popular belief among scholars is that Muirchú wrote the Vita Patricii to encourage conversion. Thomas O’Loughlin argues that it is clear that Muirchú was not only aware of what steps needed to be taken to convince people to convert, but had a deep theological understanding of it and the processes it would take. Hughes also mentions that Muirchú's writings clearly indicate that the Ui Néill, the dominant political power at that time, owed their conversion to Christianity to Patrick. O’Loughlin suggests that the aim of Muirchú in the Vita was to send a message to his audience; that they had seen the truth of Christianity through Patrick's efforts and that they could still rely on him in his saint form as they had when he lived. By having their own saint, in the sense that Patrick's actions were centred in Ireland, the Irish Christians would have had a lasting figure to rely on as an intermediary to God. By portraying that Patrick had convinced the Ui Néill to become Christians, other Irish people may have been inspired to follow suit if the powerful family's path, possibly to gain more powerful positions and favours that may not have been granted to those who were not Christian.

== Lasting effects of Muirchú’s work ==
Use of the Vita sancti Patricii for all three previously stated reasons is generally agreed on by scholars. Muirchú was an initiator of Irish hagiography, and the Vita provides one of the earliest examples of hagiography in Ireland, a model for a tradition that would endure for many centuries to come. Muirchú's work would go on to influence later Lives of Patrick, such as the Vita tripartita Sancti Patricii. Though very little is known about Muirchú's life, his education background and his desire to help spread Christianity throughout Ireland and encourage conversions can be seen through the Vita Patricii. Moreover, through examining Muirchú's text it is possible to see an example of what opinions an early Irish Christian had and how he might have imagined his own religious history. Like the figure of Saint Patrick that Muirchú wrote about, Muirchú was also eager to help with the conversion process, and his desires are reflected in the Vita sancti Patricii through his historic and literary figure.

== See also ==
- Tírechán
- Book of Armagh

== Bibliography ==
- Olden, Thomas (1894). "Muirchu Maccu Machtheni" . In Lee, Sidney (ed.). Dictionary of National Biography. Vol. 39. London: Smith, Elder & Co.
- Aitchison, Nicholas Boyter. Armagh and the Royal Centres in Early Medieval Ireland: Monuments, Cosmology, and the Past. Rochester, N.Y: Published for Cruithne Press by Boydell and Brewer, 1994.
- Bieler, Ludwig (1974). "Muirchú's life of St. Patrick as a Work of Literature". Medium Ævum. 43 (3): 219–233. doi:10.2307/43628033. JSTOR 43628033.
- Bieler, Ludwig, edited. The Patrician Texts in the Book of Armagh. Dublin: Dublin Institute for Advanced Studies, 1979.
- De Paor, Liam. Saint Patrick's World: The Christian Culture of Ireland's Apostolic Age. Dublin: Four Courts Press, 1993.
- Falaky Nagy, Joseph. Conversing With Angels and Ancients: Literary Myths of Medieval Ireland. Icatha, N.Y: Cornell University Press, 1997.
- Hanson, R.P.C. Saint Patrick: His Origins and Career. Oxford: Clarendon Press, 1968.
- Hood, A. (trans.) (1978) St Patrick : his writings and Muirchu's "Life" London: Phillimore.
- Howlett, David. The Celtic Latin Tradition of Biblical Style. Blackrock, Co. Dublin: Four Courts Press, 1995
- Hughes, Kathleen. Early Christian Ireland: Introduction to the Sources. London : Sources of History Ltd, Hodder and Stoughton, 1972.
- McCreary, Alf. Saint Patrick's City: The Story of Armagh. Belfast: The Blackstaff Press, 2001.
- O'Leary, Aideen (July 1996). "An Irish Apocryphal Apostle: Muirchú's Portrayal of Saint Patrick". Harvard Theological Review. 89 (3): 287–301. doi:10.1017/S0017816000031904. S2CID 162980166.
- O'Loughlin, Thomas (2006). "Muirchú's Poisoned Cup: A Note on Its Sources". Ériu. 56: 157–162. JSTOR 30007055.
- O’Loughlin, Thomas. “Muirchu's Theology of Conversion in His Vita Patricii,” in Celts and Christians: New Approaches to the Religious Traditions of Britain and Ireland. Edited by Mark Atherton. Cardiff: University of Wales Press, 2002.
- Staunton, Michael. Voice of the Irish: The Story of Christian Ireland. Mahwah, N.J: HiddenSpring Press, 2003.
- Thornton, David E. "Muirchú (fl. 697)". Oxford Dictionary of National Biography (online ed.). Oxford University Press. doi:10.1093/ref:odnb/19503. (Subscription, Wikipedia Library access or UK public library membership required.)
- Walsh, John R. and Thomas Bradley. A History of the Irish Church 400–700 A.D. Blackrock, Co. Dublin: The Columba Press, 1991.
