= Eochu Apthach =

High King of Ireland

Eochu (or Eochaid) Apthach ("outlaw" or "fatal") of the Corcu Loígde of County Cork, a distant descendant of Breogán, the father of Míl Espáine, was, according to medieval Irish legend and historical tradition, a High King of Ireland. He took power after killing the previous incumbent, Bres Rí. He only ruled for a year, and it is said there was a plague every month during that year. He was killed by Finn mac Blatha, a descendant of Ollom Fotla. The Lebor Gabála Érenn synchronises his reign with that of Darius the Great of Persia (522–485 BC). The chronology of Geoffrey Keating's Foras Feasa ar Éirinn dates his reign to 726–725 BC, that of the Annals of the Four Masters to 953–952 BC.

Preceded by Bres Rí	High King of Ireland; LGE 6th/5th century BC; FFE 726–725 BC; AFM 953–952 BC	Succeeded by Finn mac Blatha
