= Uí Liatháin =

Early kingdom of Munster in southern Ireland

- 4th century–c. 1220
- Capital: included Castlelyons
- Common languages: Irish
- Religion: Celtic polytheism, Celtic Christianity (coexistent)
- Government: Monarchy
  - fl. c. 340 AD: Eochu Liathán
  - 13th century: independent princes
- Historical era: fl. Late Antiquity
  - Established: 4th century
  - Disestablished: c. 1220
- ISO 3166 code: IE

Map of medieval Ireland, with the Uí Liatháin visible in the south.

The Uí Liatháin (Irish pronunciation: [iː ˈlʲiəhaːnʲ]) were an early kingdom of Munster in southern Ireland. They belonged the same kindred as the Uí Fidgenti, and the two are considered together in the earliest sources, for example The Expulsion of the Déisi (incidentally). The two have been given various origins among both the early or proto-Eóganachta and among the Érainn or Dáirine by different scholars working in a number of traditions, with no agreement ever reached or appearing reachable. It is entirely possible that they were the product of a combination of lineages from both these royal kindreds, or alternatively of another origin entirely.

Eochu Liathán ("Eochu the Grey"), son of Dáire Cerbba, is the ancestor after which the Uí Liatháin is named.

The small village of Castlelyons (Caisleán Ó Liatháin) in East County Cork preserves the name of one of their last royal seats in the High Middle Ages, as does the name of Killaliathan Church, County Limerick.

The two most powerful septs of the Uí Liatháin were the Uí Meic Caille (including the Uí Anmchada) and the Uí Thassaig (later known as the Uí Meic Tire). Following the Norman invasion of Ireland, the Uí Meic Caille gave their name to the barony of Imokilly.

== Career in Britain ==
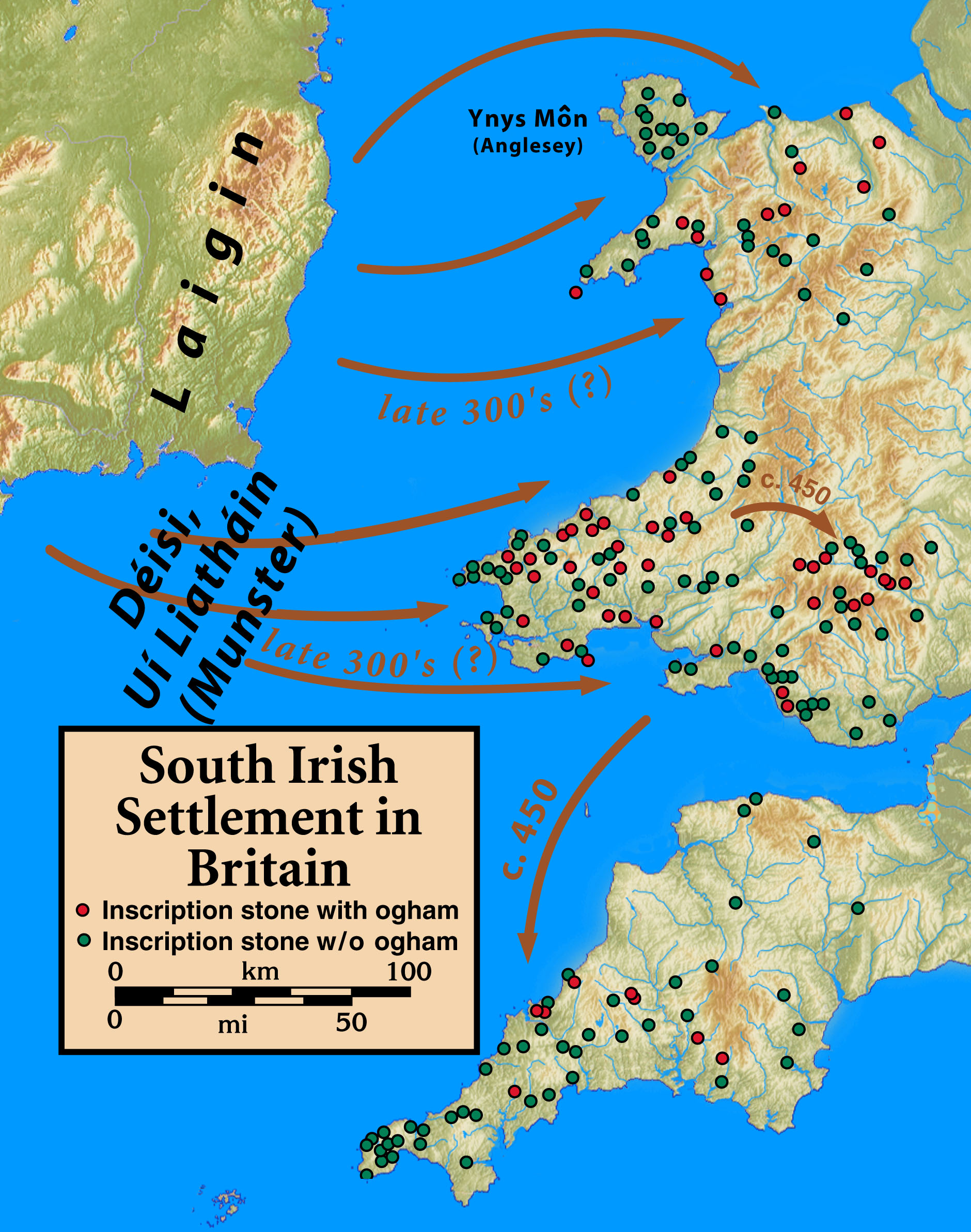

The Uí Liatháin are known from both Irish and British sources, respectively the Sanas Cormaic and Historia Brittonum, to have had colonies in Wales and Cornwall. According to the Historia Brittonum they were driven out of North Wales by Cunedda and his sons, and possibly have settled in South Wales such as the kingdoms of Dyfed, Ystrad Tywi, and Brycheiniog since they weren’t driven out from there.

Alongside the Uí Liatháin in this region of Britain were a significant force of the so-called Déisi, whose story is told in the famous Expulsion of the Déisi already mentioned above, as well as a smaller population of the Laigin. Neither are specifically connected to the Uí Liatháin, or connected to each other, in any of the Irish sources, but collaboration can certainly not be ruled out, especially in matters relating to trade, including the slave trade. The Déisi Muman lived adjacent to them in the neighbouring County Waterford and the Laigin could be found not much farther east in the Kingdom of Leinster.

The Uí Liatháin can, however, be associated easily with their apparent relation Crimthann mac Fidaig, the legendary King of Munster and dominant High King of Ireland of the 4th century. They are mentioned not only in the same passage in the Sanas Cormaic, but are close relations in all the earliest genealogical manuscripts.

In a 1926 paper, Eoin MacNeill discusses the movements of the Uí Liatháin at considerable length, arguing their leadership in the South Irish conquests and founding of the later dynasty of Brycheiniog, figures in the Welsh genealogies matching Uí Liatháin dynasts in the Irish genealogies. He argues any possible settlement of the Déisi would have been subordinate until the ousting of the Uí Liatháin by the sons of Cunedda. The founder of Brycheiniog, Brychan, is in all probability the early dynast Macc Brocc (for whom see below), while the name Braccan also occurs early in the pedigrees of the Uí Fidgenti and Uí Dedaid, close kindred of the Uí Liatháin. MacNeill further associates this with the sovereignty in Ireland and conquests in Britain of their first cousin, the monarch Crimthann mac Fidaig.

== Relations ==
Bressal mac Ailello Thassaig was an early king of Munster according to one source. His sister Angias was the queen of Lóegaire mac Néill, High King of Ireland, and mother of Lugaid mac Lóegairi, who later became High King himself despite the initial wishes of Saint Patrick, thanks to Angias' beseeching the saint. She and Bressal were children of (Ailill) Tassach, son of Eochu Liathán.

Ruithchern, daughter of the King of Iarmuman (and possibly Munster), Áed Bennán mac Crimthainn, and sister of Mór Muman, was taken captive by the Uí Liatháin and forced to herd sheep.

At the Battle of Carn Conaill, the Uí Liatháin are listed among the Munster allies of Guaire Aidne mac Colmáin, a mention dismissed by Byrne, but discussed at length by Seán Ó Coileáin, who relates it to the cycle of Mór Muman and Ruithchern.

Both the mother, Gormgel, and celebrated wife, Caillech, of the infamous Cathal mac Finguine, King of Munster and King of Tara, were from the Uí Liatháin.

== Later centuries ==
A substantial part of the recently defunct kingdom was granted to the De Barry family by John of England in 1206, although the Uí Meic Tire persisted in a southern outpost for a few decades following.

== Pedigree (illustrative) ==
Based on Rawlinson B 502, the Book of Leinster, the Vita tripartita Sancti Patricii, the Banshenchas, Foras Feasa ar Éirinn, and Flann mac Lonáin

  Dáire Cerbba / Maine Munchaín
               |
               |___________________________________________________________________________________________
               |                     |                       |                      |                      |
               |                     |                       |                      |                      |
            Fidach              Fiachu Fidgenid        Eochu Liathán         Uí Duach Argetrois        Uí Dedaid
               |                                             |
               |__________________________                   |_____________________________
               |                          |                                                |
               |                          |                                                |
 Crimthann mac Fidaig            Mongfind = Eochaid Mugmedón = Cairenn              Ailill Tassach
                                               |                  |                        |
                                               |                  |                        |
                                           Connachta     Niall Noígíallach                 |
                                                                  |             ___________|
                                                                  |            |           |
                                                     Lóegaire mac Néill = Angias   Bressal mac Ailello
                                                                        |
                                                                        |
                                                               Lugaid mac Lóegairi

== Septs and surnames ==
The two most prominent septs of the Uí Liatháin were the following:

=== Uí Meic Caille ===
The Uí Meic Caille (Uí Maic Caille), who gave their name to the Barony of Imokilly, took their name from Meic Caille, son of Meic Brócc, son of Eochu Liathán.

- Uí Meic Caille (O'Kiely, Kiely, Keily, Kiley, Keely, Kealy, Quelly)
- Uí Anmchada (Lane, Lyons, Lehane)
- Uí Glaissín (Glashan, Gleason, Gleeson)
- Uí Charráin (Ó Corráin, Curran)

=== Uí Thassaig ===
These were the descendants of the aforementioned Ailill Tassach, son of Eochu Liatháin.

- Uí Meic Tire (Ó Mic Thíre, Mictyre, MacTyre, MacTire, Wolfe, Woulfe)
