= Dunlea v Attorney-General =

- Court: Court of Appeal of New Zealand
- Full case name: ANGELA MARIE DUNLEA First Appellant TRAVIS RAYMOND HARDIE Second Appellant MELISSA ROCHELLE DUNLEA Third Appellant BILLIE JOEL MALCOLM TE WHAKE Fourth Appellant GRAEME NOEL BUXTON Fifth Appellant RONALD GEORGE GRAHAM Sixth Appellant v Attorney-General
- Decided: 14 June 2000
- Citation: [2000] NZCA 84; [2000] 3 NZLR 136; (2000) 18 CRNZ 1; (2000) 5 HRNZ 707
- Transcript: Court of Appeal judgment

Court membership
- Judges sitting: Richardson J, Gault J, Thomas J, Keith J, Blanchard J

Keywords
- negligence

Dunlea v Attorney-General [2000] NZCA 84; [2000] 3 NZLR 136; (2000) 18 CRNZ 1; (2000) 5 HRNZ 707 is a cited case in New Zealand regarding breaches of Bill of Rights Act civil claims in tort

== Background ==
The police were looking for a suspect that had just committed an armed robbery. Police were told that he lived in the "back flat" of an address, and a search warrant was duly drafted. However, when they came to the address, it was hard to determine which was the "back flat", which was unfortunate for the 3 occupants of the front flat, as well as their 3 visitors.

The 6 occupants had firearms pointed at them, searched, and forced to lay on the ground, while the police proceeded to arrest the armed robbery suspect who was in the other flat. The parties sued the police for breaching the Bill of Rights Act, for unlawful search and detention. The police defended the matter claiming section 71 of the Arms Act immunized them here.

== Decision ==
The Court of Appeal, sitting as a bench of five, ruled that they had been subject to unlawful detention, awarding B $18,000 and G $16,000. The court did however reverse the previous awarding of exemplary costs.
