= Corc mac Luigthig =

Irish king of 4th century

Corc mac Luigthig (340-379), also called Conall Corc, Corc of Cashel, and Corc mac Láire, is the hero of Irish language tales which form part of the origin legend of the Eóganachta, a group of kindreds which traced their descent from Conall Corc and took their name from his ancestor Éogan Mór. The early kindred they belonged to are known as the Deirgtine. He was probably a grandson of Ailill Flann Bec, and possible cousins were Dáire Cerbba and the famous Crimthann mac Fidaig. The latter is his opponent in a celebrated cycle of stories.

== Biography ==
The name and identity of Corc's actual father is something of a mystery, however. While certainly belonging to the kindred of the proto-Eóganachta, he is inconsistently named in the genealogies and tales as Lugaid or Láre. Further confusion is caused by the fact that a certain Láre Fidach is named as the father of Crimthann in one, although not necessarily the oldest, source (Laud 610), because this would rather implausibly make him and Corc brothers. In the tales Crimthann is his uncle or cousin. David Sproule more or less gets around this by arguing that Corc's father should be Lugaid Láre and that the Laud pedigree has been misread and/or is erroneous.

One of the two wives of Conall Corc was Aimend, daughter of Óengus Bolg, king of the Corcu Loígde. The other, the daughter of the King of the Picts, is stated in the genealogies to have been Mongfind, although she is likely confused with an Irish queen of the same name, who may or may not have been Crimthann mac Fidaig's sister.

These tales include:

- Senchas Fagbála Caisil (The story of the finding of Cashel)
- Conall Corc 7 Ríge Caisil (Conall Corc and the Kingship of Cashel)
- Comthoth Lóegairi co cretim 7 a aided (The Conversion of Lóegaire to the Faith and his Violent Death)
- Conall Corc 7 Corco Loígde (Conall Corc and the Corco Loígde)

== Sources ==
- Byrne, Francis John (1973), Irish Kings and High-Kings, London: Batsford, ISBN 0-7134-5882-8
- Charles-Edwards, T. M. (2000), Early Christian Ireland, Cambridge: Cambridge University Press, ISBN 0-521-36395-0
- Ó Cróinín, Dáibhí (1995), Early Medieval Ireland 400–1200, Longman History of Ireland, London: Longman, ISBN 0-582-01565-0
- MacKillop, James (1998), Oxford Dictionary of Celtic Mythology, Oxford: Oxford University Press, ISBN 0-19-860967-1
- Wiley, Dan (2004), "Conall Corc 7 Ríge Caisil", The Cycles of the Kings, archived from the original on 7 May 2008
- Wiley, Dan (2004), "Senchas Fagbála Caisil", The Cycles of the Kings, archived from the original on 7 May 2008
