= Kilmaine (barony) =

Barony in County Mayo, Ireland

Kilmaine Cill Mheáin (Irish)
- Barony
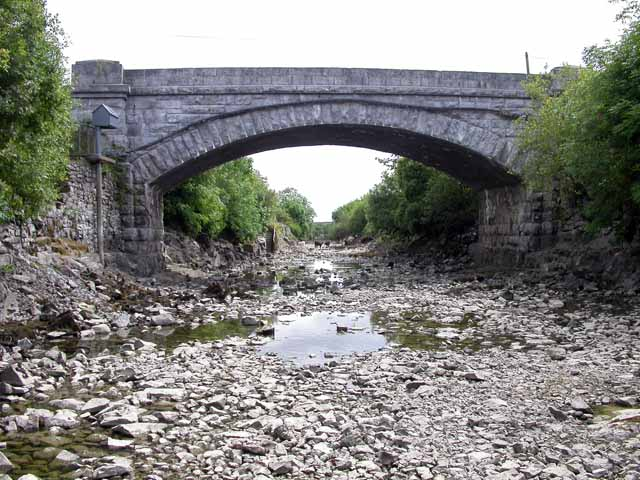
- Carrownagower Bridge on the Cong Canal

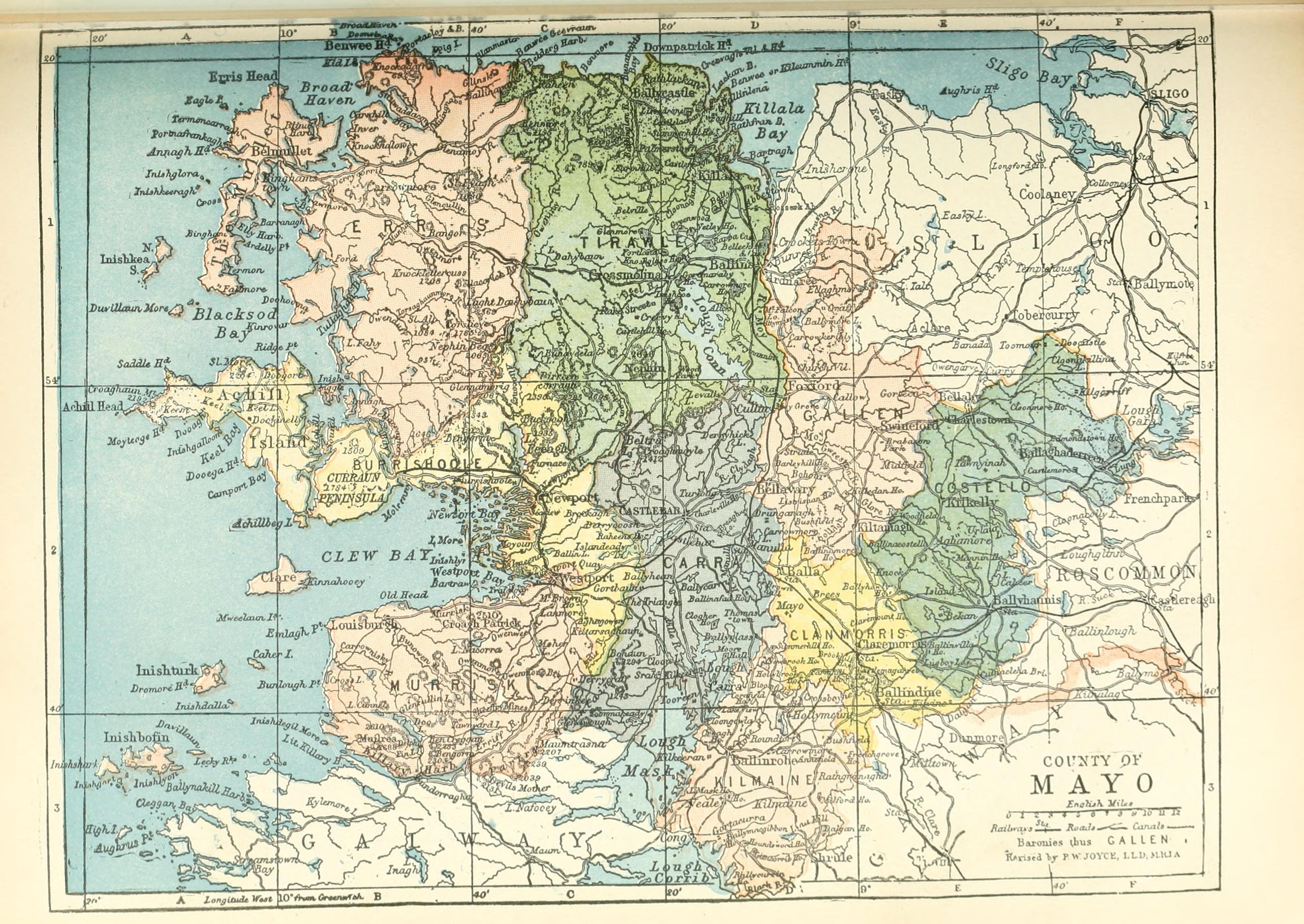
- Barony map of County Mayo, 1900; Kilmaine is in the south, coloured pink.

- Location within Ireland
- Coordinates: 53°37′N 9°08′W
- Sovereign state: Ireland
- Province: Connacht
- County: Mayo

Area
  - Total: 385.6 km^{2} (148.9 sq mi)

Kilmaine (Irish: Cill Mheáin, also called Coolagh) is a historical barony in south County Mayo, Ireland.

Baronies were mainly cadastral rather than administrative units. They acquired modest local taxation and spending functions in the 19th century before being superseded by the Local Government (Ireland) Act 1898.

== History ==
The name derived from Irish Cill Mheáin, "middle church," supposedly, the church at Kilmaine was the middle one of three founded by Saint Patrick in the area.

Kilmaine barony was created before 1574. It was formed from the Gaelic Irish territories of the Con-macne-Quiltola (Conmaicne Cuile) and Muinter Crechain (of the Uí Fiachrach Muaidhe). The local chiefs had the surname sept of O Talcaráin. After the Norman conquest, the Jennings family, descended from Norman Burkes, had large holdings in this area. The barony is also called Coolagh, derived from the Conmaicne Cuile.

In 1722, the title of Baron Kilmaine was created for the soldier James O'Hara (also the 2nd Baron Tyrawley). It became extinct when he died in 1773 without legitimate children.

The title "Baron Kilmaine" was recreated in 1789 for Sir John Browne, 7th Baronet and has been held by his heirs ever since. The current holder is John Francis Sandford Browne, 8th Baron Kilmaine (born 1983).

== Geography ==
Kilmaine is in the south of the county east of Lough Mask and Lough Corrib.

== List of settlements ==
Settlements within the historical barony of Kilmaine include:

- Ballinrobe
- Cong
- Hollymount
- Kilmaine
- Mayo (village)
- Neale
- Roundfort
- Shrule
