= Aimend =

In Irish mythology and genealogy, Aimend is the daughter of Óengus Bolg, king of the Dáirine or Corcu Loígde. She marries Conall Corc, founder of the Eóganachta dynasties, and through him is an ancestor of the "inner circle" septs of Eóganacht Chaisil, Eóganacht Glendamnach, and Eóganacht Áine, who established the powerful kingship of Cashel. Details of the story imply she may have originally been a goddess (Byrne 2001: 166, 193).

== Etymology ==
This name appears to be derived from Proto-Celtic *aidu-mandā. The name literally means "burning stain," which may have been a byword for the notion of ‘sunburn’ (q.v. ). The Romano-British form of this Proto-Celtic name is likely to have been *Aedumanda (q.v. ).
