= Psalter of Cashel =

The Psalter of Cashel (Irish: Saltair Caisil) is a now-lost Irish manuscript, which seems to have been highly influential in Irish historiographical tradition. Not an actual Psalter, it seems to have contained Munster-oriented genealogies, king-lists, synchronisms, and hagiographical material, among other items. Its contents can be at least partially reconstructed via subsequent citation of the manuscript and a couple of descriptions of it; some material may well be reflected or, in some cases, preserved in later, still-extant manuscripts. Both medieval and modern scholarship often holds that the codex was compiled by Cormac mac Cuilennáin (died 908), bishop and king of Munster. However, it is now generally thought to have been produced under Brían Boruma (died 1014), king of Munster and aspirant king of Ireland, to justify and promote the claims of his own rising dynasty and region. Nonetheless, it could quite possibly have been based on earlier materials. Plentiful citations of the codex by name down to the seventeenth century, particularly for its genealogical doctrines, imply that it had a high status among scholars. Its last known location was in the library of the Earls of Kildare, from which it disappeared at some point in the 1630s or 1640s, the library itself being destroyed and dispersed in 1642.
