= The Discovery Programme =

The Discovery Programme: Centre for Archaeology and Innovation Ireland is an all-Ireland centre for archaeology and heritage research. It was established by the Irish Government in 1991. It is a company limited by guarantee, funded mainly through the Heritage Council. It has registered as a charity with the Charities Regulator.

Its primary aim is to benefit the community by the advancement of culture, heritage and sciences, and in particular by enhancing the understanding of Ireland’s past through archaeological and related research in the humanities and sciences, establishing and directing research programmes, promoting such research; and promoting an appreciation of Ireland’s archaeological heritage through education and outreach programmes.

== Projects ==
=== Tara Research Project ===
The Discovery Programme began carrying out research at Tara in 1992, often in collaboration with the Centre for Archaeological Survey at the Department of Archaeology, NUI Galway. The research on Tara led to the publication of a guidebook for a general audience, "Tara: The Guidebook".

=== Western Stone Forts ===
The Western Stone Forts Project was initiated to study a distinctive group of large stone forts located along the western seaboard of Ireland, including Dún Aonghasa on the Aran Islands, which was excavated in the period 1992 to 1995. The project led to the publication of the book "Dún Aonghasa: The Guidebook".

=== Ogham ===
The "Ogham in 3D" project is a collaboration between the School of Celtic Studies, Dublin Institute for Advanced Studies, the Irish National Monuments Service and The Discovery Programme. The ultimate aim of the project was to laser-scan as many as possible of the approximately four hundred surviving Ogham stones in Ireland and in areas such as Wales, the Isle of Man, Devon and Cornwall, and Scotland. The project was launched on 9 May 2015 and has carried out fieldwork in Kerry, Waterford, Roscommon, Mayo, Clare, Cork, and Kilkenny.

=== Archaeology 2025 ===
"Archaeology 2025" is a long-term strategy to promote Irish archaeology into the future. Launched in 2016, it is an initiative of the Royal Irish Academy (RIA) and the development of the strategy from 2015 to 2017 has been facilitated by the Discovery Programme.

== Funding ==
The core funding of The Discovery Programme is an annual grant from The Heritage Council that amounted to €750,000 in 2015, a 40% drop from its peak in 2008. In common with all HEIs and cultural institutions, The Discovery Programme is expected to seek funding from other sources.
