= Carra (barony) =

Barony in County Mayo, Ireland

Carra Ceara
- Barony
- Location in Ireland
- Coordinates: 53°48′N 9°24′W
- Country: Ireland
- Province: Connacht
- County: County Mayo
- Elevation: 60 m (200 ft)
- Time zone: UTC+0 (WET)
  - Summer (DST): UTC-1 (IST (WEST))
- Irish Grid Reference: G240192

Carra (Irish: Ceara) is one of the nine baronies of County Mayo in Ireland, located in the mid-south area of the county. It is sometimes known as Burriscarra. It incorporates the town of Castlebar, the villages of Tourmakeady, Belcarra and Turlough, where the National Museum of Country Life is situated.

Carra covers an area from approximately Pontoon and Beltra Lough at its northern end to Partry (Ballyovey) near Ballinrobe and Tourmakeady at its southern end.

== History ==
Clans in the region include the Partraige, Uí Fiachrach. There are several references to locations and inhabitants of what is now encompassed by the barony. Such as, in Tírechán collections, the Book of Leinster and other manuscripts:

- Regiones Maicc Ercae in Tirechan's Breverium.
- Maige Maicc Ercae in Tirechan's Vita Tripartita.
- Cuile Conaire.
- campum Caeri;
- Cera i Connachtaib.
- im Mag Cerae; im maigib maicc Ercae.

Eoin MacNeill commented:

"i. e. Fir Cherai, their land was wide, i. e. the territory of Cera, until the sons of Brion took it from them as eric for Brion, who fell by Fiachra in the battle of Damchluain.' Our texts refer evidently to a more limited district, which must be located in the northern part of the barony of Carra, bordering on the barony of Tirawley."

A place called Corcu Temne or "Temenrige" is mentioned in Trichans's Brevium as "i Ceri contra solis occasum" which MacNeill translated as "in the west of Cere/Carra".

In the original Vita tripartita Sancti Patricii, Tírechán said Saint Patrick travelled here from Conmaicne Cuile Tolad, establishing a church at a place named Cuil Chorra (Old Irish).

== Places of interest ==
=== Moore Hall ===
Moore Hall, the home place of George Henry Moore and his family from 1795 until 1923 is situated within Carra barony. A number of notable members of the Moore family were born in Moore Hall, including Maurice George Moore and the novelist George Moore. The house, situated above the shores of Lough Carra, was burned in 1923 during the Irish Civil War by the Anti-Treaty Irish Republican Army. The house was purchased by Mayo County Council in 2018 with plans for redevelopment. The majority of the surrounding estate is owned by Coillte and is maintained as a public amenity.

=== National Museum of Country Life ===
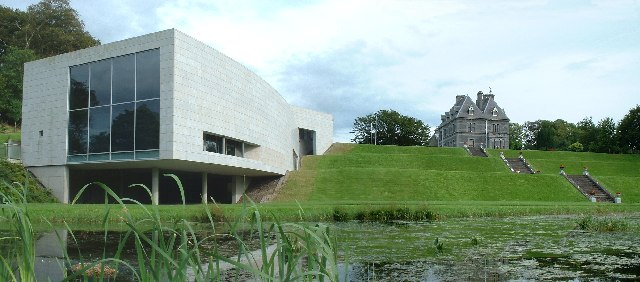
The National Museum of Country Life in just outside Castlebar at Turlough.

This Museum of Country Life is one of the National Museums of Ireland and situated just off the main road to Castlebar from the east.

== Annalistic references ==
- AI1032.8 Ua Fogartaig, king of the men of Cera, died.

== Sources ==
- Best; Bergin; O'Brien; O'Sullivan (1954–1983). An Leabhar Laighneach: The Book of Leinster. Vol. I–VI.
- Bieler, Ludwig (1979). The Patrician Texts in the Book of Armagh (Scriptores Latini Hiberniae X, Tírechán ed.). pp. 122–167.
- Knox, Hubert Thomas (1908). The History of the County of Mayo, to the close of the sixteenth century (PDF). Dublin: Hodges, Figgis & Co., Ltd.
- MacNeill, Eoin (1932). "The Vita Tripartita of St. Patrick". Ériu. Ériu, vol. 11: 1–41. JSTOR 30008085.
- O'Donovan, John, ed. (1856). Annála Rioghachta Éireann. Annals of the Kingdom of Ireland by the Four Masters ... with a Translation and Copious Notes. 7 vols. Translated by O'Donovan (2nd ed.). Dublin: Royal Irish Academy. CELT editions. Full scans at Internet Archive: Vol. 1; Vol. 2; Vol. 3; Vol. 4; Vol. 5; Vol. 6; Indices.
