= Tírechán =

Irish bishop

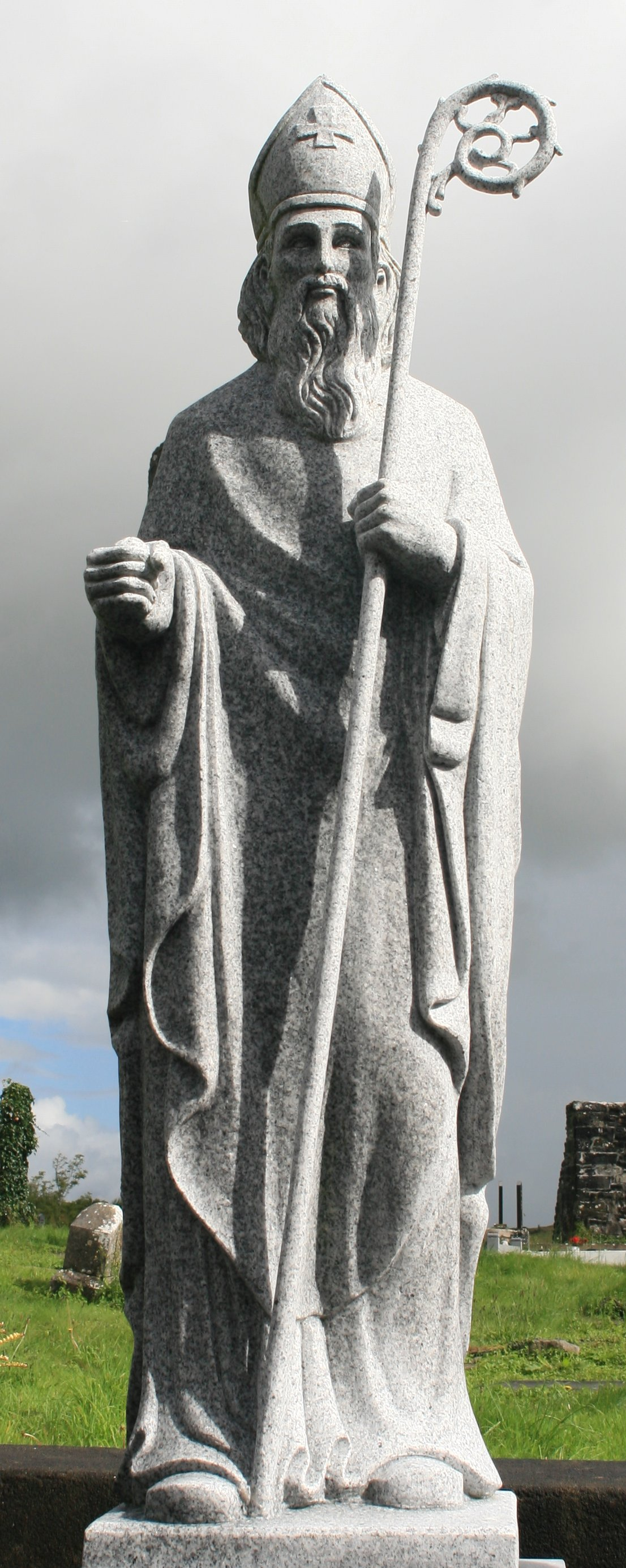
Statue of St Patrick from Aughagower.

Tírechán was a 7th-century Irish bishop from north Connacht, specifically the Killala Bay area, in what is now County Mayo.

== Background ==
Based on a knowledge of Irish customs of the times, historian Terry O’Hagan has concluded that Tírechán was probably from a wealthy, elite family. Sometime in the 650s, he was sent to Ardbraccan in County Meath as a "fosterling" and student of Ultan, bishop of Ardbraccan. References to numerous geographical areas and to sites such as holy wells, cemeteries, crosses, and churches have led O’Hagan to call Tírechán one of the most "widely travelled" of early medieval writers.

== Works ==
Tírechán is known to have authored one work, the Collectanea. This is a biography of St. Patrick which has been preserved in the Book of Armagh. The Collectanea is often called a hagiography, but it may be better described as an itinerarium. Tírechán presents Patrick's journey through the north of Ireland and lists the various foundations he establishes along the way. Tírechán wrote in Latin, and historian Terry O’Hagan indicates that Tírechán’s work should be considered "a work in progress" in that he probably died before his work was complete. Tírechán says that he drew on the oral and written testimony of Bishop Ultán. Ultán was Tírechán's teacher. Tírechán wrote to promote the cult of Patrick, and he was especially critical of institutions associated with rival saints who possess foundations which Tírechán viewed as belonging to Patrick. He chastises the community of Columba and Clonmacnoise for appropriating foundations associated with Patrick.

Tirechán has been credited, incorrectly, with authoring other texts. This includes the Catalogus Sanctorum Hiberniae, which Grosjean dated to c.900. Eoin Mac Neill had assigned Tírechán as the author of Vita tripartita Sancti Patricii, however, this has been roundly rejected.

== Floruit ==
Tírechán's Collectanea has been dated to between 688 and 693 by Thomas Charles-Edwards. Tírechán mentions recent plagues that had afflicted Ireland. These probably refer to those recorded for 664-6 and 686-8. The late seventh century witnessed a flourishing of Patrician literature as seen in Muirchú's Vita Patricii and the Liber Angeli.
