= Sírna Sáeglach =

Sírna Sáeglach ("the long-lived"), son of Dian mac Demal, son of Demal mac Rothechtaid, son of Rothechtaid mac Main, was, according to medieval Irish legend and historical tradition, a High King of Ireland. He separated the province of Ulster from the authority of the High King, and is said to have made war against the Ulaid, who had killed his great grandfather, for a hundred years according to the Lebor Gabála Érenn, 150 years according to the Annals of the Four Masters, but Geoffrey Keating, citing an ancient poem, gives him only twenty-one years. According to one version of the Lebor Gabála, the Ulaid united with the Fomorians and gave him battle at Móin Trógaide in County Meath, but a plague fell on them and the leaders of both sides died. According to another version, agreed by Keating and the Four Masters, Sírna was killed by Rothechtaid Rotha at Alind. The Lebor Gabála synchronises the start of his reign with the reign of Deioces of the Medes (694–665 BC), and his death with his successor Phraortes (665–633 BC). The chronology of Keating's Foras Feasa ar Éirinn dates his reign to 814–794 BC, that of the Annals of the Four Masters to 1181–1031 BC.

Preceded by Ailill mac Slánuill	High King of Ireland; LGE 7th century BC; FFE 814–794 BC; AFM 1181–1031 BC	Succeeded by Rothechtaid Rotha
