= Vita tripartita Sancti Patricii =

Hagiography of Saint Patrick

The Vita tripartita Sancti Patricii (The Tripartite Life of Saint Patrick) is a bilingual hagiography of Saint Patrick, written partly in Irish and partly in Latin. The text is difficult to date. Kathleen Mulchrone had assigned a late ninth century date based on the latest historical reference in the text. However, on linguistic grounds, it has been dated to as late as the twelfth century. The text as it stands probably reflects various stages of development. Máire Herbert summarises:

While there are some textual references indicative of ninth-century date, in my opinion the text was continued thereafter and completed around or after the mid-tenth century. Some decades later, in the eleventh century, the text was edited as a tripartite homily designed for preaching during celebration of the saint's feast.

It was meant to be read in three parts over the three days of the Patrick's festival. James F. Kenney said that the Tripartite Life represents "the evolution of the Patrick legend nearly completed." While the Tripartite Life bears many similarities with earlier texts, and developed from them, the text as a whole is more brazen, and has a polemical character.

== Editions and translations ==
- Mulchrone, Kathleen, ed. and tr. (1939). Bethu Phátraic. The Tripartite Life of Patrick. Vol. 1. Dublin.
  - University of Frankfurt: in four parts (, , , )
- Stokes, Whitley, ed. and tr. The Tripartite Life of Patrick: With Other Documents Relating to that Saint Vol.I. London.
  - The Tripartite Life of Patrick: With Other Documents Relating to that Saint Vol. II
