= Samhain =

Gaelic festival marking the start of winter

- Observed by: Historically: Gaels; Today: Irish people; Scottish people; Manx people; Modern pagans
- Type: Cultural; Pagan ( Celtic polytheism; Celtic neopaganism; Druidry; Wicca )
- Significance: End of the harvest season, beginning of winter
- Celebrations: Bonfires; Guising or Mumming; Divination; Saining; Veneration of the dead; Feasting
- Date: 1 November (or 1 May for Neopagans in the Southern Hemisphere)
- Duration: 1 day and night
- Frequency: Annual
- Related to: Allantide; All Saints' Day; All Souls' Day; Calan Gaeaf; Day of the Dead; Dziady; Halloween; Hop-tu-Naa; Kekri; Winter Nights

Samhain (/ˈsɑː.wɪn/ SAH-win, /ˈsaʊ.ɪn/ SOW-in; Irish: [ˈsˠəunʲ]; Scottish Gaelic: [ˈs̪ãũ.ɪɲ]) or Sauin (Manx: [ˈsoːɪnʲ]) is a Gaelic festival on 1 November marking the end of the harvest season in autumn and beginning of winter or the "darker half" of the year. It is also the Irish and Scottish Gaelic name for November. Celebrations began on the evening of 31 October, since the Celtic day began and ended at sunset. The festival originated in Ireland and it was widely observed throughout Ireland, Scotland, and the Isle of Man. Its Brittonic Celtic equivalent is called Calan Gaeaf in Wales.

Samhain is believed to have Celtic pagan origins, and some Neolithic passage tombs in Great Britain and Ireland are aligned with the sunrise at the time of Samhain. Samhain is mentioned in the earliest Irish literature, from the 9th century, and is associated with many important events in Irish mythology. The early literature says Samhain was marked by great gatherings and feasts and was when the ancient burial mounds were open, which were seen as portals to the Otherworld. Some of the medieval tales also associate Samhain with bonfires and sacrifice.

The festival was not recorded in detail until the early modern era. It was when cattle were brought down from the summer pastures and livestock were slaughtered. Special bonfires were lit, which were deemed to have protective and purifying powers. Like Bealtaine, Samhain was a liminal or threshold festival, when the boundary between this world and the Otherworld thinned, making contact with the aos sí (the 'spirits' or 'fairies') more likely. Most scholars see them as remnants of pagan deities.

At Samhain, they were appeased with offerings of food and drink to ensure the people and livestock survived the winter. The souls of dead kin were also thought to revisit their homes seeking hospitality, although this is more often said to happen on All Souls' Eve. Mumming and guising were part of the festival from at least the early modern era, whereby people went door-to-door in costume, reciting verses in exchange for food. The costumes may have been a way of imitating and disguising oneself from the aos sí. Divination was also a big part of the festival and often involved nuts and apples. In the late 19th century, John Rhys and James Frazer suggested it had been the "Celtic New Year", but that is disputed.

In the 9th century, the Western Church endorsed 1 November as the date of All Saints' Day, possibly due to the influence of Alcuin or Irish missionaries, and 2 November later became All Souls' Day. It is believed that Samhain and All Saints'/All Souls' influenced each other and the modern Halloween. Most American Halloween traditions were inherited from Irish and Scottish immigrants. Folklorists have used the name 'Samhain' to refer to Gaelic 'Halloween' customs until the 19th century, and Oíche Shamhna (Samhain Eve or November Eve) is the Gaelic name for Halloween.

Since the late 20th century, Celtic neopagans and Wiccans have observed Samhain, or something based on it, as a religious holiday.

== Name ==
In Modern Irish and Scottish Gaelic the name is Samhain, while the traditional Manx Gaelic name is Sauin. It is usually written with the definite article An tSamhain (Irish), An t-Samhain (Scottish Gaelic), and Yn Tauin (Manx). Older forms of the word include the Scottish Gaelic spellings Samhainn and Samhuinn. The Gaelic names for the month of November are derived from Samhain.

Samhain Eve or Halloween (31 October) is Oíche Shamhna (/ˈiːhə ˈhaʊnə/ EE-hə HOW-nə) in Irish, Oidhche Shamhna in Scottish Gaelic, and Oie Houney in Manx. This is sometimes anglicized as "November Eve".

In Ireland, Samhain was also called "spirit night" (oíche na sprideanna) or "púca night" (oíche na bpúcaí) in modern times. On the Isle of Man, it is also called Hop-tu-Naa.

The name of the superficially similar Galician festival of Samaín, from the Cedeira district, is etymologically unrelated, being derived from Latin sambucum 'elderberry'.

=== Etymology ===
These names all come from the Old and Middle Irish Samain or Samuin [ˈsaβ̃ɨnʲ], the name for the festival held on 1 November in medieval Ireland. Traditionally, it is derived from proto-Indo-European *semo ('summer'). But as John T. Koch points out, it is unclear why a festival marking the beginning of winter would include the word for 'summer'. Linguist Joseph Vendryes contends that it is unrelated, saying that the Celtic summer ended in August. More recently, linguists Xavier Delamarre and Ranko Matasović have proposed that it derives from proto-Celtic *samoni ('reunion, assembly'), cognate with Old Norse saman, Gothic samana and Sanskrit samāna (all meaning 'together'), as well as the Old Irish term bech-samain ('bee swarm'). Delamarre further suggests it could refer to an "assembly of the living and the dead".

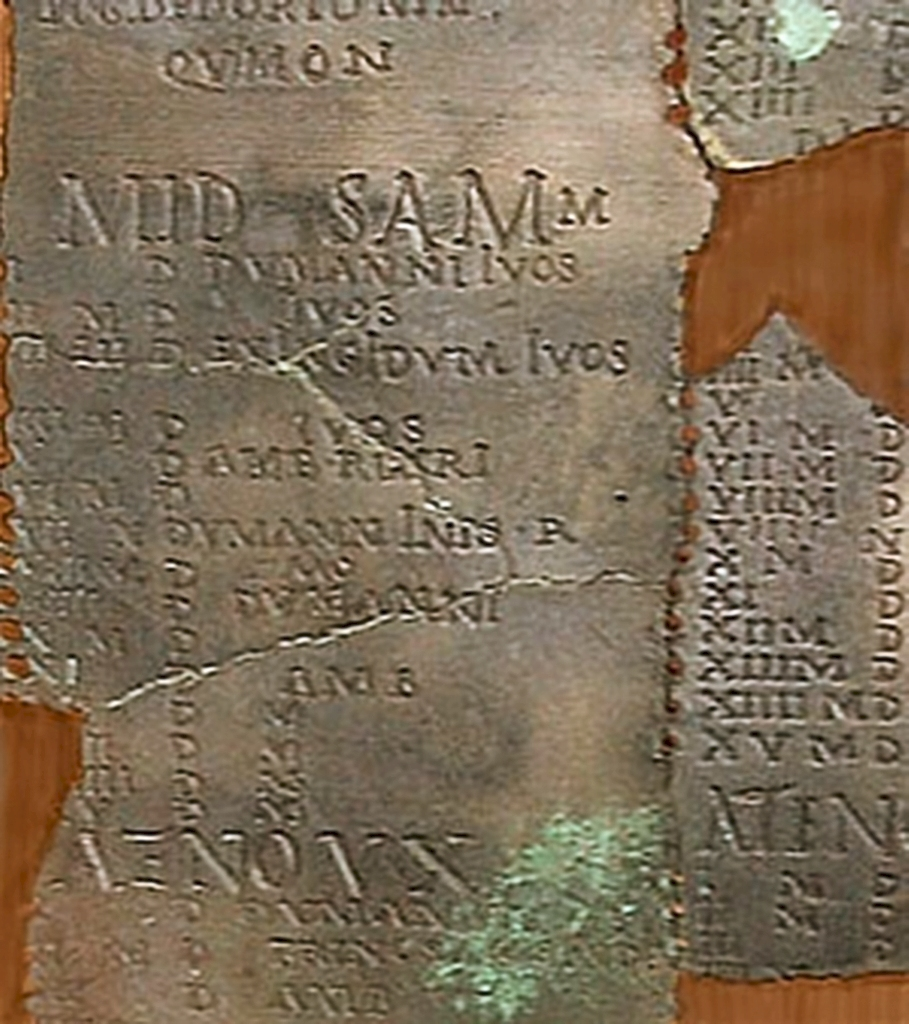
Samon on the Coligny calendar

The word Samain is believed to be related to the month name SAMON or SAMONIOS on the Gaulish Coligny calendar from the 2nd century CE. The 17th day of SAMON is marked as TRINOX SAMONI ("the three nights of Samon"), indicating a possible festival. This festival could represent the early November festival of Samain, or possibly the summer solstice. The Old Irish cognate Trenae Samna is found in the text Serglige Con Culainn. Six months later on the Coligny calendar is the month GIAMON, which appears to contain the word for "winter". Likewise, an Old Irish glossary, Sanas Cormaic, gives Gamain and Mí Gaim as "November, the winter month after the festival of Samain".

== Origins ==
Samhain was one of four Gaelic seasonal festivals, along with Imbolc (around 1 February), Bealtaine (around 1 May), and Lughnasa (around 1 August). Evidence suggests that Samhain and Bealtaine, marking the transitions into winter and summer respectively, were the most significant. It is theorised that these two festivals had pastoral origins and were important to herding communities practising seasonal transhumance, which was once widespread in Ireland (where it was called "booleying"), Britain, and other parts of Europe. Glosses in the Senchas Már, a 7th–8th century Irish collection of laws, say that it is customary to drive cattle out to the summer pasture around May Day (im Beltaine) and to drive them back around November Day (im Samain).

Historian Ronald Hutton writes, "there seems to be no doubt that the opening of November was the time of a major pagan festival" in Celtic Britain and Ireland".

Some Neolithic passage tombs in Ireland are aligned with the sunrise around the times of Samhain and Imbolc. These include the Mound of the Hostages (Dumha na nGiall) at the Hill of Tara, and Cairn L at Slieve na Calliagh.

== In Irish mythology ==
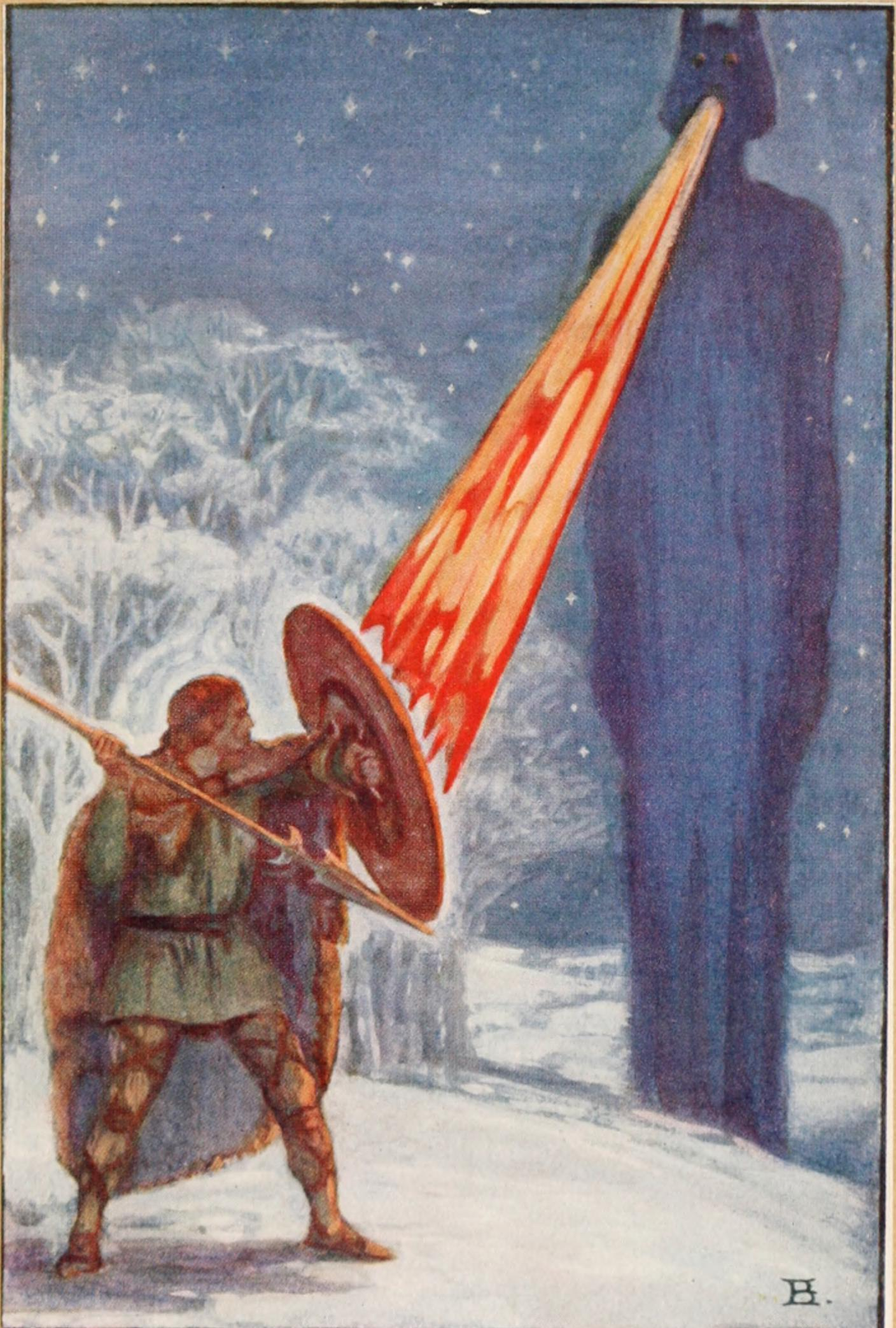
The hero Fionn fighting Aillen, who is said to have burned Tara each Samhain

While Irish mythology was originally a spoken tradition, much of it was eventually written down in the Middle Ages by Christian monks. The tenth-century tale Tochmarc Emire ('The Wooing of Emer') lists Samhain as the first of the four seasonal festivals of the year. The literature says a peace would be declared, and there were great gatherings where they held meetings, feasted, drank alcohol, and held contests. These gatherings are a popular setting for early Irish tales. The tale Echtra Cormaic ('Cormac's Adventure') says that the Feast of Tara was held every seventh Samhain, hosted by the High King of Ireland, during which new laws and duties were ordained; anyone who broke the laws established during this time would be banished.

According to Irish mythology, Samhain (like Bealtaine) was a time when the 'doorways' to the Otherworld opened, allowing supernatural beings and the souls of the dead to come into our world; while Bealtaine was a summer festival for the living, Samhain "was essentially a festival for the dead". The Boyhood Deeds of Fionn says that the sídhe (fairy mounds or portals to the Otherworld) "were always open at Samhain". Each year the fire-breather Aillen emerges from the Otherworld and burns down the palace of Tara during the Samhain festival after lulling everyone to sleep with his music. One Samhain, the young Fionn mac Cumhaill, stays awake and slays Aillen with a magical spear, for which he is made leader of the fianna.

In a similar tale, one Samhain, the Otherworld being Cúldubh emerges from the burial mound on Slievenamon and snatches a roast pig. Fionn kills Cúldubh with a spear throw as he re-enters the mound. Fionn's thumb is caught between the door and the post as it shuts, and he puts it in his mouth to ease the pain. As his thumb had been inside the Otherworld, Fionn is bestowed with great wisdom. This may refer to gaining knowledge from the ancestors. Acallam na Senórach ('Colloquy of the Elders') tells how three female werewolves emerge from the cave of Cruachan (an Otherworld portal) each Samhain and kill livestock. When Cas Corach plays his harp, they take on human form, and the fianna warrior Caílte then slays them with a spear.

Some tales suggest that offerings or sacrifices were made at Samhain. In the Lebor Gabála Érenn (or 'Book of Invasions'), each Samhain the people of Nemed had to give two-thirds of their children, their corn, and their milk to the monstrous Fomorians. The Fomorians seem to represent the harmful or destructive powers of nature; personifications of chaos, darkness, death, blight, and drought. This tribute paid by Nemed's people may represent a "sacrifice offered at the beginning of winter, when the powers of darkness and blight are in the ascendant".

According to the later Dindsenchas and the Annals of the Four Masters—which were written by Christian monks—Samhain in ancient Ireland was associated with a god or idol called Crom Cruach. The texts claim that a firstborn child would be sacrificed at the stone idol of Crom Cruach in Magh Slécht. They say that King Tigernmas, and three-fourths of his people, died while worshiping Crom Cruach there one Samhain.

The legendary kings Diarmait mac Cerbaill and Muirchertach mac Ercae each die a threefold death on Samhain, which involves wounding, burning, and drowning, and of which they are forewarned. In the tale Togail Bruidne Dá Derga ('The Destruction of Dá Derga's Hostel'), king Conaire Mór also meets his death on Samhain after breaking his geasa (prohibitions or taboos). He is warned of his impending doom by three undead horsemen who are messengers of Donn, the god of the dead.

The Boyhood Deeds of Fionn tells how each Samhain the men of Ireland went to woo a beautiful maiden who lives in the fairy mound on Brí Éile (Croghan Hill). It says that each year someone would be killed "to mark the occasion", by persons unknown. Some academics suggest that these tales recall human sacrifice, and argue that several ancient Irish bog bodies (such as Old Croghan Man) appear to have been kings who were ritually killed, some of them around the time of Samhain.

In the Echtra Neraí ('The Adventure of Nera'), King Ailill of Connacht sets his retinue a test of bravery on Samhain night. He offers a prize to whoever can make it to a gallows and tie a band around a hanged man's ankle. Demons thwart each challenger, who runs back to the king's hall in fear. However, Nera succeeds, and the dead man asks for a drink. Nera carries him on his back, and they stop at three houses. They enter the third, where the dead man drinks and spits it on the householders, killing them. Returning, Nera sees a fairy host burning the king's hall and slaughtering those inside. He follows the host through a portal into the Otherworld. Nera learns that what he saw was only a vision of what will happen the next Samhain unless something is done. He returns to the hall and warns the king.

The tale Aided Chrimthainn maic Fidaig ('The Killing of Crimthann mac Fidaig') tells how Mongfind kills her brother, King Crimthann of Munster, so that one of her sons might become king. Mongfind offers Crimthann a poisoned drink at a feast, but he asks her to drink from it first. Having no other choice but to drink the poison, she dies on Samhain eve. The Middle Irish writer notes that Samhain is also called Féile Moingfhinne (the Festival of Mongfind or Mongfhionn) and that "women and the rabble make petitions to her" at Samhain.

Many other events in Irish mythology happen or begin on Samhain. The invasion of Ulster that makes up the main action of the Táin Bó Cúailnge ('Cattle Raid of Cooley') begins on Samhain. As cattle-raiding typically was a summer activity, the invasion during this off-season surprised the Ulstermen. The Second Battle of Magh Tuireadh also begins on Samhain. The Morrígan and The Dagda meet and have sex before the battle against the Fomorians; in this way, the Morrígan acts as a sovereignty figure and gives the victory to the Dagda's people, the Tuatha Dé Danann. In Aislinge Óengusa ('The Dream of Óengus') it is when he and his bride-to-be switch from bird to human form, and in Tochmarc Étaíne ('The Wooing of Étaín') it is the day on which Óengus claims the kingship of Brú na Bóinne.

The 'Cave of Cruachan', one of the many 'gateways to the Otherworld' whence beings and spirits were said to have emerged on Samhain

Several sites in Ireland are especially linked to Samhain. Each Samhain, a host of otherworldly beings was said to emerge from the Cave of Cruachan in County Roscommon. The Hill of Ward (or Tlachtga) in County Meath is thought to have been the site of a great Samhain gathering and bonfire; the Iron Age ringfort is said to have been where the goddess or druid Tlachtga gave birth to triplets and where she later died.

In The Stations of the Sun: A History of the Ritual Year in Britain (1996), Ronald Hutton writes: "No doubt there were [pagan] religious observances as well, but none of the tales ever portrays any". He says that the only historical reference to pagan religious rites is in the work of Geoffrey Keating (died 1644), whose source is unknown. Hutton says it may be that no religious rites are mentioned because, centuries after Christianisation, the writers had no record of them. Hutton suggests Samhain may not have been particularly associated with the supernatural. He says that the gatherings of royalty and warriors on Samhain may have been an ideal setting for such tales, in the same way that many Arthurian tales are set at courtly gatherings at Christmas or Pentecost.

== Historical customs ==
Samhain was one of the four main festivals of the Gaelic calendar, marking the end of the harvest and the beginning of winter and the 'darker half' of the year. It was historically observed on 31 October–1 November throughout Ireland, Scotland and the Isle of Man.

Samhain customs are mentioned in several medieval texts. Togail Bruidne Dá Derga ("The Destruction of Dá Derga's Hostel"), written in the 10th century but based on older texts, says that it was customary to light a great fire at Samhain, called a tendál samna or torc tened (boar fire), and to cast stones into these fires. In Serglige Con Culainn ("Cúchulainn's Sickbed"), written in the 11th century, it is said that the festival of the Ulaid at Samhain lasted a week: Samhain itself, and the three days before and after. It involved great gatherings where they held meetings, feasted, drank alcohol, and held contests. The medieval text Scél na Samhna (Story of Samhain), included in the 15th century Book of Lismore, says that Samhain was the chief festival of the pagans and was when they worshipped all their gods. It links this to All Saints' Day being instituted by the Romans.

It is mentioned in Geoffrey Keating's Foras Feasa ar Éirinn ("Foundation of Knowledge on Ireland"), which was written in the 1600s but drew on earlier medieval sources, some of which are unknown. He claims that the feis of Tara was held for a week every third Samhain when the nobles and ollams of Ireland met to lay down and renew the laws, and to feast. He also claims that the druids lit a sacred bonfire at Tlachtga and made sacrifices to all the gods, sometimes by burning them. He adds that all other fires were doused and re-lit from this bonfire.

=== Bonfires ===
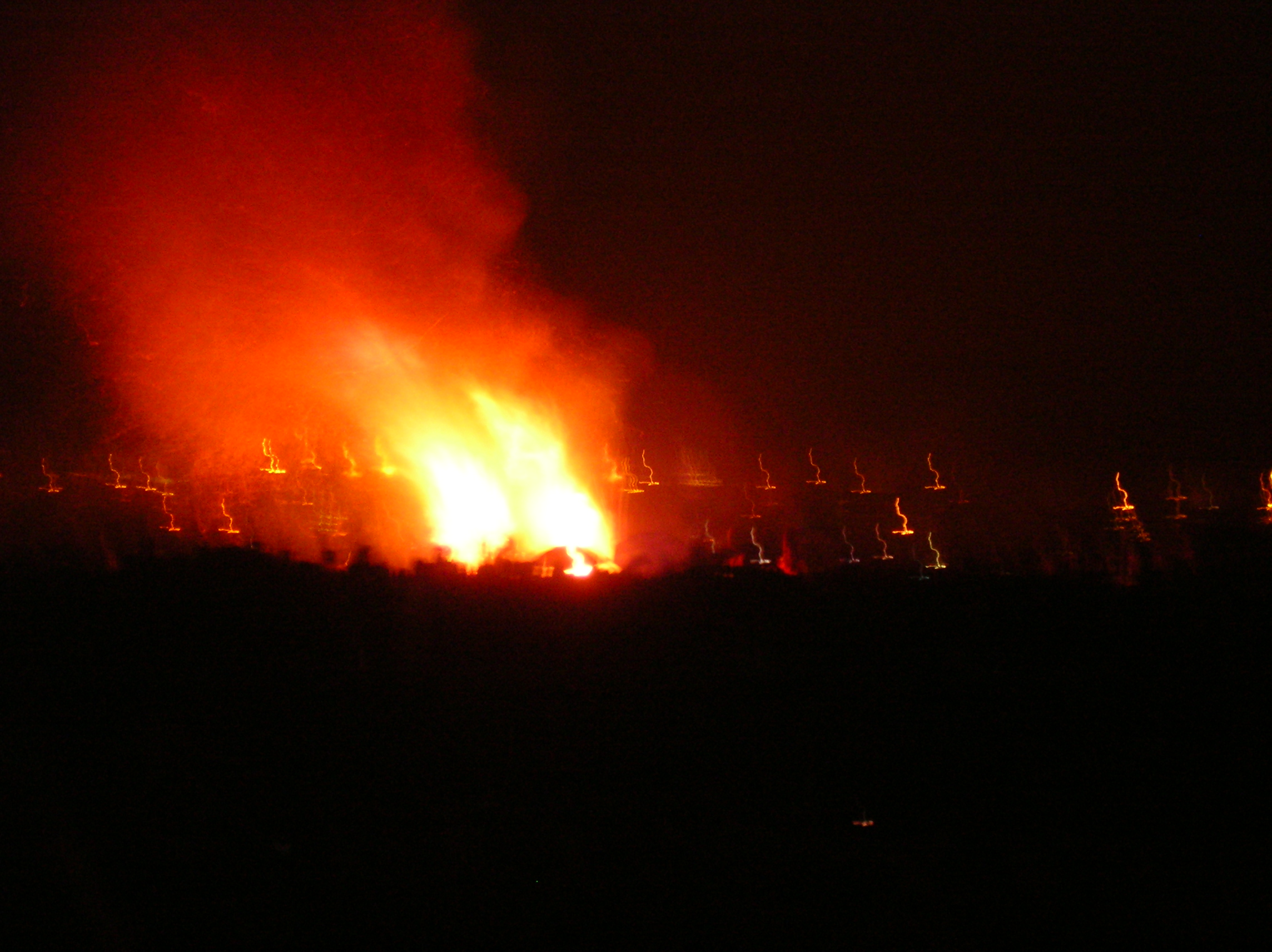
A Beltane bonfire in Scotland

Like Bealtaine, bonfires were lit on hilltops at Samhain, and there were rituals involving them. They did not begin to be recorded in detail until the early modern era, when the tradition was dying out. By this time, they were most common in parts of the Scottish Highlands, on the Isle of Man, in north and mid-Wales, and in Ulster. F. Marian McNeill says that they were formerly need-fires, but that this custom died out. Likewise, only certain kinds of wood were traditionally used, but later records show that many kinds of flammable material were burnt. It is suggested that the fires were a kind of imitative or sympathetic magic; mimicking the Sun, helping the "powers of growth" and holding back the decay and darkness of winter. They may also have served to symbolically "burn up and destroy all harmful influences". Accounts from the 18th and 19th centuries suggest that the fires, smoke, and ashes were deemed to have protective and cleansing powers.

In 19th-century Moray, boys asked for bonfire fuel from each house in the village. When the fire was lit, "one after another of the youths laid himself down on the ground as near to the fire as possible so as not to be burned and in such a position as to let the smoke roll over him. The others ran through the smoke and jumped over him". When the bonfire burnt, they scattered the ashes, vying for who should scatter them most. In some areas, two bonfires would be built side by side, and the people—sometimes with their livestock—would walk between them as a cleansing ritual. The bones of slaughtered cattle were said to have been cast upon bonfires.

People also took the flames from the bonfire back to their homes. During the 19th century, in parts of Scotland, torches of burning fir or turf were carried sunwise around homes and fields to protect them. In some places, people doused their hearth fires on Samhain night. Each family then solemnly re-lit its hearth from the communal bonfire, thus bonding the community. The 17th-century writer Geoffrey Keating claimed that this was an ancient tradition instituted by the druids. Dousing the old fire and bringing in the new may have been a way of banishing evil, which was part of New Year festivals in many countries.

=== Divination ===
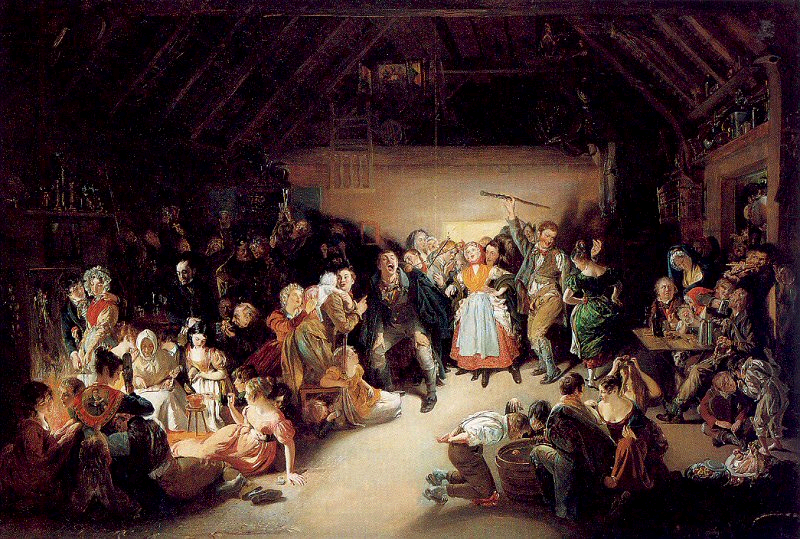
Snap-Apple Night (1833), painted by Daniel Maclise, shows people playing divination games on 31 October in Ireland.

The bonfires were used in divination. In 18th-century Ochtertyre, a ring of stones—one for each person—was laid around the fire, perhaps on a layer of ash. Everyone then ran around it with a torch, "exulting". In the morning, the stones were examined, and if any were mislaid, it was said that the person it represented would not live out the year. A similar custom was observed in north Wales and in Brittany. James Frazer suggests this may come from "an older custom of actually burning them" (i.e. human sacrifice) or it may have always been symbolic. Divination has likely been a part of the festival since ancient times, and it has survived in some rural areas.

At household festivities throughout the Gaelic regions and Wales, many rituals were intended to divine the future of those gathered, especially concerning death and marriage. In these regions it was the most celebrated night of the year for divination. Apples and hazelnuts were often used in these divination rituals and games. In Celtic mythology, apples were strongly associated with the Otherworld and immortality, while hazelnuts were associated with divine wisdom. One of the most common games was apple bobbing. Another involved hanging a small wooden rod from the ceiling at head height, with a lit candle on one end and an apple hanging from the other. The rod was spun round, and everyone took turns to try to catch the apple with their teeth. Apples were peeled in one long strip, the peel tossed over the shoulder, and its shape was said to form the first letter of the future spouse's name.

Two hazelnuts were roasted near a fire; one named for the person roasting them and the other for the person they desired. If the nuts jumped away from the heat, it was a bad sign, but if the nuts roasted quietly, it foretold an excellent match. Items were hidden in food—usually a cake, barmbrack, cranachan, champ or sowans—and portions of it served out at random. A person's future was foretold by the item they happened to find; for example, a ring meant marriage, and a coin meant wealth. A salty oatmeal bannock was baked; the person ate it in three bites and then went to bed in silence without anything to drink. This was said to result in a dream in which their future spouse offers them a drink to quench their thirst. Egg whites were dropped in water, and the shapes foretold the number of future children. Young people would also chase crows and divine some of these things from the number of birds or the direction they flew.

=== Spirits and souls ===
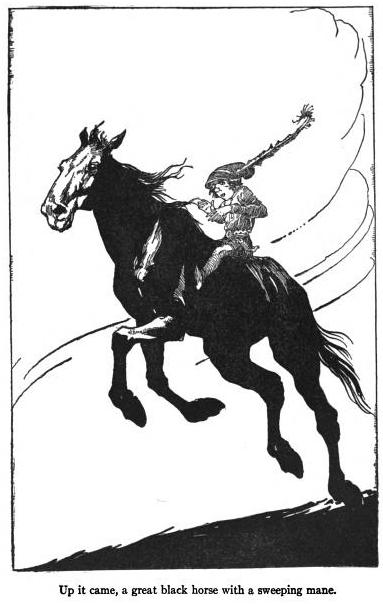
Illustration of a púca riding a black horse, from The King of Ireland's Son (1916)

Samhain was seen as a liminal and supernaturally dangerous time, when the boundary between this world and the Otherworld could more easily be crossed. This meant the aos sí, the 'spirits' or 'fairies', could more easily come into our world. Many scholars see the aos sí as remnants of pagan gods and nature spirits. At Samhain, it was believed that the aos sí needed to be propitiated to ensure that people and livestock survived the winter. It was also believed that anyone travelling on this night could be led astray or taken by the fairies. Ronald Hutton says that Samhain "was certainly a time when supernatural forces were especially to be guarded against or propitiated". He notes the same superstitions about the start of summer (Beltaine), and believes these come from prehistoric beliefs and fears about the turning of the seasons.

Offerings of food and drink would be left outside for the aos sí, and portions of the crops were left in the ground for them. People took special care not to offend the aos sí and sought to ward off anyone out to cause mischief. They stayed near to home or, if forced to walk in the darkness, turned their clothing inside-out to disguise themselves, or carried iron or salt to keep them at bay.

In southern Ireland, it was customary on Samhain to weave a small cross of sticks and straw called a 'parshell' or 'parshall', which was similar to the Brigid's cross and God's eye. It was fixed over the doorway to ward-off bad luck, sickness, and witchcraft and would be replaced each Samhain.

One custom—described as a "blatant example" of a "pagan rite surviving into the Christian epoch"—was recorded in the Outer Hebrides and Iona in the 17th century. On the night of 31 October, fishermen and their families would go down to the shore. One man would wade into the water up to his waist, where he would pour out a cup of ale and ask 'Seonaidh' ('Shoney'), whom he called "god of the sea", to bestow on them a good catch. The custom was ended in the 1670s after a campaign by ministers, but the ceremony shifted to the springtime and survived until the early 19th century.

Hutton says there is no evidence that Samhain was originally a festival of the dead. However, in modern times, the dead were honoured at this time. In 19th century Ireland, the souls of the dead were said to revisit their homes seeking hospitality, although this was more often believed to happen on All Souls' Night. Places were set at the dinner table and by the fire to welcome them. The beginning of winter may have been seen as the most fitting time to honour the dead, as it was a time of 'dying' in nature. The belief that the souls of the dead return home on one night of the year and must be appeased seems to have ancient origins and is found in many cultures throughout the world. James Frazer suggests, "It was perhaps a natural thought that the approach of winter should drive the poor, shivering, hungry ghosts from the bare fields and the leafless woodlands to the shelter of the cottage". However, the souls of thankful kin could return to bestow blessings just as easily as that of a wronged person could return to wreak revenge.

=== Mumming and guising ===
Guisers including 'strawboys' (pictured) made appearances at Samhain/All hallows' Eve

In some areas, mumming and guising were part of Samhain. It was first recorded in 16th century Scotland and later in parts of Ireland, Mann, and Wales. People went from house to house in costume or disguise, usually reciting songs or verses in exchange for food. It may have evolved from a tradition whereby people impersonated the aos sí, or the souls of the dead, and received offerings on their behalf. Impersonating these spirits or souls was also believed to protect oneself from them. S. V. Peddle suggests the guisers "personify the old spirits of the winter, who demanded reward in exchange for good fortune". McNeill suggests that the ancient festival included people in masks or costumes representing these spirits and that the modern custom came from this. In Ireland, costumes were sometimes worn by those who went about before nightfall collecting for a Samhain feast.

In Scotland, young men went house-to-house with masked, veiled, painted, or blackened faces, often threatening to do mischief if they were not welcomed. This was common in the 16th century in the Scottish countryside and persisted into the 20th. It is suggested that the blackened faces come from using the bonfire's ashes for protection.

In Ireland in the late 18th century, peasants carrying sticks went house-to-house on Samhain collecting food for the feast. Charles Vallancey wrote that they demanded this in the name of St Colm Cille, asking people to "lay aside the fatted calf, and to bring forth the black sheep". In parts of southern Ireland during the 19th century, the guisers included a hobby horse known as the Láir Bhán (white mare). A man covered in a white sheet and carrying a decorated horse skull would lead a group of youths, blowing on cow horns, from farm to farm. At each, they recited verses, some of which "savoured strongly of paganism", and the farmer was expected to donate food. By doing so, he could expect good fortune from the 'Muck Olla'; not doing so would bring misfortune. This is akin to the Mari Lwyd (grey mare) procession in Wales, which takes place at Midwinter. In Wales, the white horse is often seen as an omen of death.

Elsewhere in Europe, costumes, mumming, and hobby horses were part of other yearly festivals. However, in the Celtic-speaking regions, they were "particularly appropriate to a night upon which supernatural beings were said to be abroad and could be imitated or warded off by human wanderers".

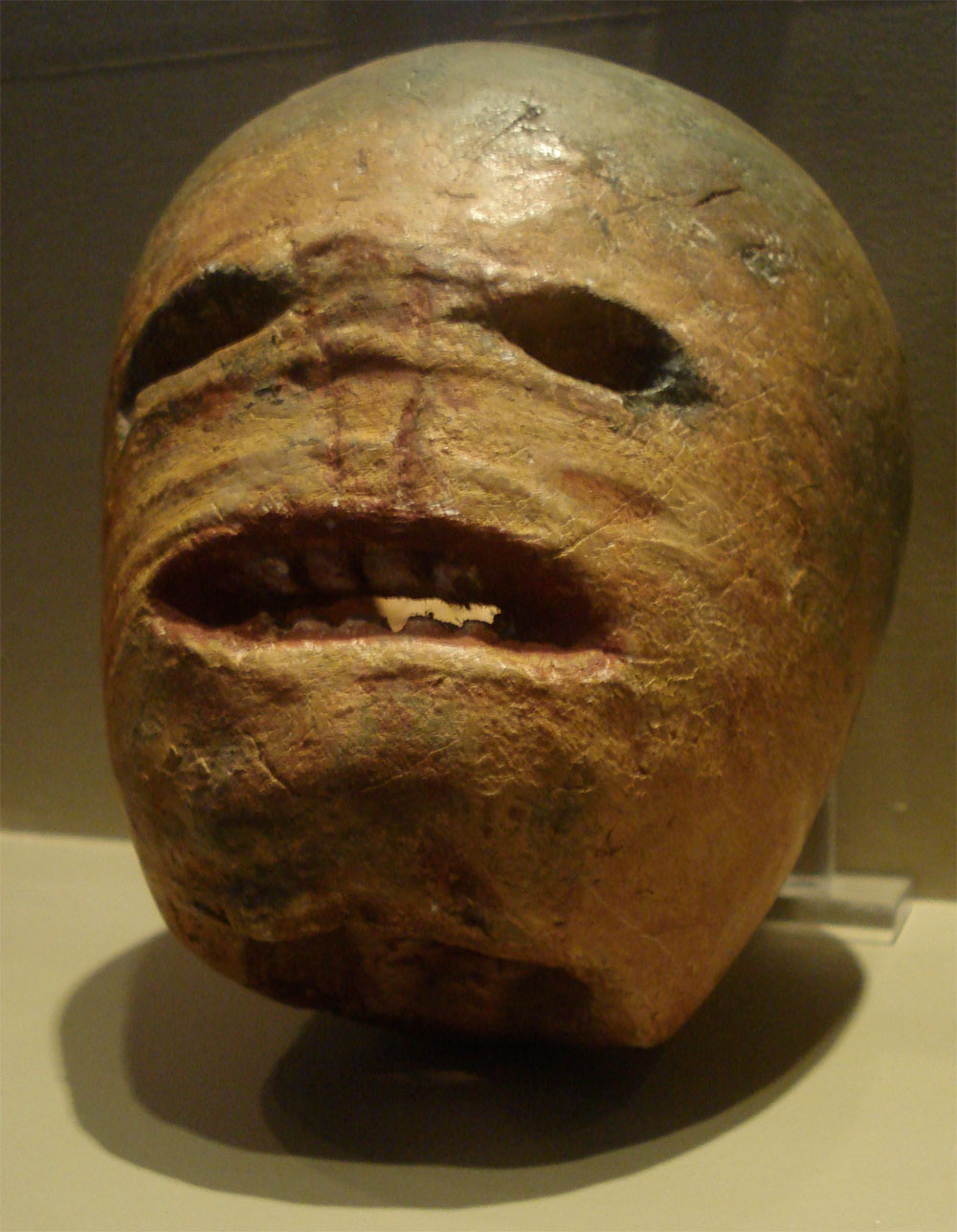
A plaster cast of an Irish Seán na Gealaí turnip lantern from the early 20th century at the Museum of Country Life

Hutton writes: "When imitating malignant spirits, it was a very short step from guising to playing pranks". Playing pranks at Samhain is recorded in the Scottish Highlands as far back as 1736 and was also common in Ireland, which led to Samhain being nicknamed "Mischief Night" in some parts. Wearing costumes at Halloween spread to England in the 20th century, as did the custom of playing pranks, though there had been mumming at other festivals.

At the time of mass transatlantic Irish and Scottish immigration, which popularised Halloween in North America, Halloween in Ireland and Scotland had a strong tradition of guising and pranks. Trick-or-treating may have come from the custom of going door-to-door collecting food for Samhain feasts, fuel for Samhain bonfires or offerings for the aos sí. Alternatively, it may have come from the Allhallowtide custom of collecting soul cakes.

The "traditional illumination for guisers or pranksters abroad on the night in some places was provided by turnips or mangel wurzels, hollowed out to act as lanterns and often carved with grotesque faces". They were also set on windowsills. By those who made them, the lanterns were variously said to represent spirits or goblins, or were used to ward off evil spirits. These were common in parts of Ireland and the Scottish Highlands in the 19th century. They were also found in Somerset (see Punkie Night). In the 20th century, they spread to other parts of Britain and became generally known as jack-o'-lanterns in English, and "tumshie lanterns" or "neepie lanterns" in Scotland.

=== Livestock ===
Traditionally, Samhain was a time to take stock of the herds and food supplies. Cattle were brought down to the winter pastures after six months in the higher summer pastures (see transhumance). It was also the time to choose which animals would be slaughtered. This custom is still observed by many who farm and raise livestock. It is thought that some of the rituals associated with the slaughter have been transferred to other winter holidays.

On St. Martin's Day (11 November) in Ireland, an animal—usually a rooster, goose, or sheep—would be slaughtered and some of its blood sprinkled on the threshold of the house. It was offered to Saint Martin, who may have taken the place of a god or gods, and it was then eaten as part of a feast. This custom was common in parts of Ireland until the 19th century, and was found in other parts of Europe. At New Year in the Hebrides, a man dressed in a cowhide would circle the township sunwise. A bit of the hide would be burnt, and everyone would breathe in the smoke. These customs were meant to keep away bad luck, and similar customs were found in other Celtic regions.

== Celtic Revival ==
During the late 19th and early 20th century Celtic Revival, there was an upswell of interest in Samhain and the other Celtic festivals. Sir John Rhys put forth that it had been the "Celtic New Year". He inferred it from contemporary folklore in Ireland and Wales, which he felt was "full of Hallowe'en customs associated with new beginnings". He visited Mann and found that the Manx sometimes called 31 October "New Year's Night" or Hog-unnaa. The Tochmarc Emire, written in the Middle Ages, reckoned the year around the four festivals at the beginning of the seasons and put Samhain at the beginning of those.

Rhys's theory was popularised by Sir James George Frazer, though at times he acknowledged that the evidence is inconclusive. Frazer also said that Samhain had been the pagan Celtic festival of the dead and had been Christianised as All Saints and All Souls. Since then, Samhain has been popularly seen as the Celtic New Year and an ancient festival of the dead. The calendar of the Celtic League, for example, begins and ends at Samhain.

Ronald Hutton says the evidence that Samhain was the Celtic or Gaelic new year is flimsy. Hutton determined, "the medieval records furnish no evidence that 1 November was a major pan-Celtic festival".

== Related holidays ==
In the Brittonic branch of the Celtic languages, Samhain is known as the "calends of winter". The Brittonic lands of Wales, Cornwall, and Brittany held festivals on 31 October similar to the Gaelic one. In Wales it is Calan Gaeaf, in Cornwall it is Allantide or Kalan Gwav, and in Brittany it is Kalan Goañv.

In parts of Germany, St. Martin's Day or Martinmas (11 November) traditions are similar to those of Samhain. In Ireland and Britain, the adoption of the Gregorian calendar meant that St Martin's Day fell on the old date of Samhain Eve. It was sometimes called Oíche Sean Shamhain (Old Samhain Eve) in Irish and "Old Halloween" in English. Stephen Sayers suggests that the eleven days from All Saints' Day to St Martin's Day might have originally marked out the Samhain festival season, similar to the Twelve Days of Christmas.

=== Allhallowtide ===
In 609, Pope Boniface IV endorsed 13 May as a holy day commemorating all Christian martyrs. By 800, churches in Gaelic Ireland and Anglo-Saxon Northumbria were holding a feast commemorating all saints on 1 November, which became All Saints' Day. There had been much Gaelic influence on Northumbria and its church during this time. James Frazer suggested this date was a Celtic idea (being the date of Samhain), while Ronald Hutton suggests it was a Germanic idea, writing that the Irish church commemorated all saints on 20 April. Some manuscripts of the Irish Martyrology of Tallaght and Martyrology of Óengus, which date to this time, have a commemoration of all saints "of Europe" on 20 April, but a commemoration of all saints of the world on 1 November. In 835, the Frankish Empire officially adopted 1 November as the date of All Saints' Day, which was endorsed by Pope Gregory IV.

This may have been influenced by Alcuin of Northumbria, who was a member of Charlemagne's court, or it may have been promoted by the Irish clerics and scholars who were also members of the Frankish court. The new date was eventually adopted by the rest of the Western Church, and in the 11th century, 2 November became established as All Souls' Day. This created the three-day observance known as Allhallowtide: All Hallows' Eve (31 October), All Hallows' Day (1 November), and All Souls' Day (2 November).

It is suggested that many of the modern secular customs of All Hallows' Eve (Halloween) were influenced by the festival of Samhain. Nicholas Rogers says that Samhain's association with darkness, liminality and the supernatural influenced the celebration of Halloween. Ronald Hutton suggests that "its importance was only reinforced by the imposition upon it of a Christian festival". Other scholars argue that Samhain's influence has been exaggerated and that All Hallows' also influenced Samhain itself.

Most North American Halloween traditions were brought over by Irish and Scottish immigrants in the 19th century. Then, through American influence, these Halloween traditions spread to many other countries by the late 20th century.

== Modern paganism ==
Some modern pagans hold Samhain and Samhain-inspired festivals. As there are many kinds of Neopaganism, their Samhain celebrations can be very different. Some try to emulate the historic festival as much as possible. Others base their celebrations on sundry unrelated sources, with Gaelic culture only one of them. Folklorist Jenny Butler describes how Irish pagans pick some elements of historic Samhain celebrations and meld them with references to the Celtic past, making a new festival of Samhain that is uniquely part of neopagan culture.

Neopagans usually celebrate Samhain on 31 October – 1 November in the Northern Hemisphere and 30 April – 1 May in the Southern Hemisphere, beginning and ending at sundown.

=== Celtic Reconstructionism ===
Like other Reconstructionist traditions, Celtic Reconstructionist Pagans (CRs) emphasise historical accuracy. They base their celebrations and rituals on traditional lore as well as research into the beliefs of the polytheistic Celts. They celebrate Samhain around 1 November but may adjust the date to suit their regional climate, such as when the first winter frost arrives. Their traditions include saining the home and lighting bonfires. Some follow the old tradition of building two bonfires, which celebrants and animals pass between as a purification ritual.

For CRs, it is a time when the dead are especially honoured. Though CRs make offerings at all times of the year, Samhain is when more elaborate offerings are made to specific ancestors. This may involve making a small altar or shrine. They often have a meal where a place for the dead is set at the table, and they are invited to join. An untouched portion of food and drink is left outside as an offering. Traditional tales may be told and traditional songs, poems, and dances performed. A western-facing door or window may be opened and a candle left burning on the windowsill to guide the dead home. Divination for the coming year is often done, whether in solemnity or as games. The more mystically inclined may also see this as a time for deeply communing with their deities, especially those particularly linked with this festival.

=== Wicca ===
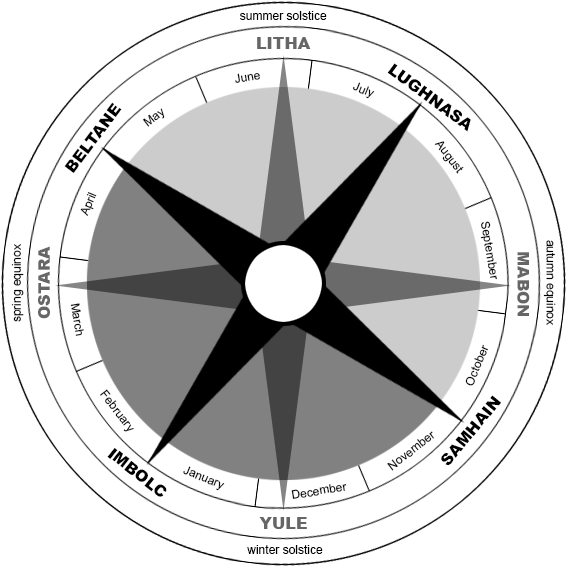
Wheel of the Year

Wiccans celebrate a variation of Samhain as one of their yearly Sabbats of the Wheel of the Year.

Most Wiccans deem it the most important of the four "greater Sabbats". Some see Samhain as a time to celebrate the lives of those who have died, and it often involves paying respect to ancestors, family members, elders of the faith, friends, pets, and other loved ones who have died. In some rituals, the spirits of the dead are invited to attend the festivities. It is seen as a festival of darkness, balanced at the opposite point of the wheel by the spring festival of Bealtaine.

Wiccans believe that at Samhain, the veil between this world and the afterlife is at its thinnest, making it easier to communicate with those who have left this world.

== See also ==
Holidays

- Bealtaine
- Imbolc
- Lammas
- Lughnasadh
- Halloween

Calendars

- Celtic calendar
- Irish calendar
- Traditional festival days of Wales

Early Irish literature

- Serglige Con Culainn
- Togail Bruidne Dá Derga
- Cath Maige Tuired
- Mesca Ulad
- Tochmarc Étaíne

- Oireachtas na Samhna
- Christianization of saints and feasts
- Irish mythology
- Lìdōng (立冬)
- Diwali
- Kali Puja
- Dziady
- Winter Nights

== Secondary sources ==
- Arnold, Bettina (31 October 2001). "Bettina Arnold – Halloween Lecture: Halloween Customs in the Celtic World". Halloween Inaugural Celebration. University of Wisconsin–Milwaukee.
- Campbell, John Gregorson (2005) [1900]. Black, Ronald (ed.). The Gaelic Otherworld. Birlinn. pp. 559–62. ISBN 1-84158-207-7.
- Danaher, Kevin. "Irish Folk Tradition and the Celtic Calendar". In The Celtic Consciousness, ed. Robert O'Driscoll. New York: Braziller, 1981. pp. 217–42. ISBN 0-8076-1136-0. On specific customs and rituals.
- Delamarre, Xavier (2003). Dictionnaire de la langue gauloise: Une approche linguistique du vieux-celtique continental (in French). Errance. ISBN 9782877723695.
- Matasović, Ranko (2009). Etymological Dictionary of Proto-Celtic. Brill. ISBN 9789004173361.
- Ross, Anne "Material Culture, Myth and Folk Memory". In The Celtic Consciousness, ed. Robert O'Driscoll. New York: Braziller, 1981. 197–216. ISBN 0-8076-1136-0.
- Stokes, Whitley (1907). "Irish etyma". Zeitschrift für vergleichende Sprachforschung. 40: 243–49.
- Vendryes, J. Lexique Étymologique de l'Irlandais Ancien (in French). ISBN 2222039215.
