= Cín Dromma Snechtai =

Early Irish manuscript

Cín Dromma Snechtai or Lebor Dromma Snechtai ("book of Druimm Snechta"; Modern Irish: Leabhar Dhroim Sneachta, IPA: [ˈl̠ʲəuɾˠ ɣɾˠiːmʲ ˈʃnʲaxt̪ˠə]) is a now lost early Irish manuscript, thought to have been written in the 8th century AD.

== Name ==
Old Irish cín, derived from the Latin quinio "five", was a small book made of five folded vellum leaves; lebor, modern Irish leabhar, is the standard word for a book. It is "named from the place of its origin or preservation, namely Druim(m) Snechta (Drumsnat, County Monaghan), where a monastery had been founded in the sixth century." The majority consensus of scholars is that the original manuscript was compiled at Bangor Abbey, County Down, the mother house of Druim Snechta monastery. A copy may then have been sent to each of the daughter houses or a scribe from Druim Snechta may have copied it at Bangor.

== Scholarship ==
Geoffrey Keating was aware of the book, although he does not seem to have had access to it himself in compiling his Foras Feasa ar Éirinn, and believed it dated to before the arrival of Saint Patrick. The 19th-century scholar Eugene O'Curry found a marginal note in the Book of Leinster, partly illegible, which said that the Cín was compiled by a son of Dauí, king of Connacht. O'Curry favoured Ernín, son of Dauí Galach, a nephew of Niall of the Nine Hostages and a contemporary of Patrick, but allowed that it may have been a son of Dauí Tenga Uma, a king of Connacht who died at the end of the fifth century (Francis J. Byrne believes the two kings were in fact the same person).

Rudolf Thurneysen, who made a convincing reconstruction of its contents in 1912-13, proposed a date in the early 8th century for the writing of the book. Other scholars have proposed dates in the 9th or 10th century, although these are disputed. It is cited as a source by many of the most important early Irish manuscripts, including Lebor na hUidre, the Book of Leinster, the Book of Ballymote, the Great Book of Lecan, and the MS Egerton 88.

Texts believed to originate from the Cín Dromma Snechtai are notable for their archaic language, and include:

- Compert Con Culainn ("the conception of Cúchulainn")
- Compert Mongán ("the conception of Mongán")
- Immran Brain ("the voyage of Bran")
- Echtra Condla ("the adventure of Conla")
- A version or précis of Togail Bruidne Dá Derga ("the destruction of Dá Derga's hostel")
- A version of Tochmarc Étaíne ("the wooing of Étaín")
- Verba Scáthaige fri Coin Culaind ("The Words of Scáthach to Cúchulainn")
- Forfes Fer Fálchae ("the siege of the men of Fálchae")
- An early version of Lebor Gabála Érenn ("Book of Invasions of Ireland")
