= Eochu Airem =

Ancient high king of Ireland

Eochu Airem ("the ploughman"), son of Finn, was, according to mediaeval Irish legend and historical tradition, a High King of Ireland during the first or second century BC. He succeeded to the throne after the death of his brother, Eochu Feidlech, and ruled for twelve or fifteen years, until he was burned to death in Fremain by Sigmall Sithienta. He was succeeded by Eterscél.

The Lebor Gabála synchronises his reign with the dictatorship of Julius Caesar (48–44 BC). The chronology of Geoffrey Keating's Foras Feasa ar Éirinn dates his reign to 82–70 BC, that of the Annals of the Four Masters to 131–116 BC.

He played an important role in the Old Irish saga Tochmarc Étaíne ("The Wooing of Étaín"), which tells of the lives of the beautiful Étaín, the lover of Midir of the Tuatha Dé Danann, who was turned into a fly by Midir's jealous wife, which had been swallowed by the wife of Étar, an Ulster warrior. Étar's wife became pregnant and Étaín was reborn. When Eochu invited the men of Ireland to the festival of Tara, they refused to attend for a king who had no queen. He sent messengers to look for the most beautiful woman in Ireland, and they found Étaín. Eochu fell in love with her at first sight and married her.

However, Eochu's brother, Ailill Angubae, also fell in love with her and wasted away with unrequited desire. Eochu left Tara on a tour of Ireland, leaving Étaín with the dying Ailill who told her the cause of his sickness which he said would be cured if she gave the word. She told him she wanted him to be well and he began to get better but said the cure would be complete only if she agreed to meet him on the hill above the house so as not to shame the king in his own house. She agreed to do so three times but, each time she went to meet him, she in fact met Midir who had put Ailill to sleep and taken his appearance. On the third occasion Midir revealed his identity and told Étaín who she really was, but she did not know him. She finally agreed to go with him, but only if Eochu agreed to let her go.

Later, after Ailill had fully recovered and Eochu had returned home, Midir came to Tara and challenged Eochu to play fidchell with him, an ancient Irish board game. They played for ever-increasing stakes. Eochu kept winning, and Midir had to pay up. One such game compelled Midir to build a causeway across the bog of Móin Lámrige. The Corlea Trackway, a wooden causeway built across a bog in County Longford dated by dendrochronology to 148 BC, is a real-life counterpart to this legendary road. Finally, Midir suggested they play for a kiss and an embrace from Étaín, and this time he won. Eochu told Midir to come back in a month for his winnings and gathered his best warriors at Tara to prepare for his return. Despite the heavy guard, Midir appeared inside the house. Eochu agreed that Midir could embrace Étaín but, when he did so, the pair flew away through the skylight, turning into swans as they went.

Eochu instructed his men to dig up every síd (fairy-mound) in Ireland until his wife was returned to him. Finally, when they set to digging at Midir's síd at Brí Léith, Midir appeared and promised to give Étaín back. But at the appointed time, Midir brought fifty women who all looked alike and told Eochu to pick which one was Étaín. He chose the woman he thought was his wife, took her home and slept with her. She became pregnant and bore him a daughter. Later, Midir appeared and told him that Étaín had been pregnant when he took her, and the woman Eochu had chosen was his own daughter who had been born in Midir's síd. Out of shame, Eochu ordered the daughter of their incestuous union to be exposed but she was found and brought up by a herdsman and his wife. She later married Eochu's successor Eterscél and became the mother of the High King Conaire Mór (in Togail Bruidne Dá Derga she is named as Mess Búachalla and is the daughter of Étaín and Eochu Feidlech).

Royal titles
Preceded by Eochaid Feidlech	High King of Ireland; LGE 1st century BC; FFE 82–70 BC; AFM 131–116 BC	Succeeded by Eterscél
