= Mac Cécht (warrior) =

Warrior in ancient Irish literature

Mac Cécht (Early Modern Irish: Mac Céacht) is the patronymic or cognomen ("son of power") given to one or two warrior champions from Connacht in the Ulster Cycle of early Irish literature. The personages may be identifical or may have been conflated at some stage, although the connection is nowhere made explicit and different fathers are ascribed to them in the tales.

== Mac Cécht mac Snáide Techid (Togail Bruidne Dá Derga) ==
Mac Cécht first appears in the tale Togail Bruidne Dá Derga ("The Destruction of Da Derga's Hostel") as the bodyguard of the High King Conaire Mor along with the Ulster hero Conall Cernach. In this tale he is called a son of Snaide Teichet. When the king goes to settle a quarrel in Munster and returns to Tara via Leinster, he is obliged to violate his gessi or taboos and is subsequently doomed. When he stays in the house of Dá Derga, a Leinster hospitaller (briugu), he is stalked by his fosterbrothers (the great-grandsons of Donn Deasa) and a British exile named Ingcél, who have become freebooting pirates and fallen out of favour with the king. While Conaire and his people feast in Dá Derga's hostel, the freebooters attack them and a battle ensues. Conaire, Mac Cécht and Conall perform prodigies of valour and kill a great many of the attackers in the melee, defeating them, but Conaire dies of his wounds. On the third day, Mac Cécht dies of his wounds on the battlefield. The interpolator +H of the Lebor na hUidre version offers an alternative ending in which Mac Cécht buries Conaire and returns to his own country, Connacht. No other version associates Mac Cécht with Connacht, which may possibly mean that the interpolator had intended to connect him with the Mac Cécht of the tale below.

Mac Cécht's role in the tale is recalled in a dindsenchas prose text on Ráith Cnámrossa, which gives his father's name in garbled form as Slaite Seched of Connacht. He is presented as the fosterfather of Lé Fer Flaith, son of Conaire, whom he tried to bring into safety when Dá Derga's hostel was on fire. However, the boy, who was kept in the hollow of his shield, died a threefold death in Corra Ednecha, having been mangled, burnt and drowned through Mac Cécht's sheer force, heat and sweat as the warrior was attempting to rescue the king. Mac Cécht buried the remaining bones, cnám-fhros "bone-shower", in a place afterwards called Cnámross. The text then offers two alternative explanations for the placename.

== Monodar son of Conrach Cas, called 'Mac Cécht' (Cath Bóinde) ==
In the late Middle Irish tale Cath Bóinde ("The Battle of the Boyne") – also Ferchuitred Medba ("Medb's husband allowance") – Mac Cécht is the nickname for Monodar son of Conrach Cas, a warrior who supposedly lived in Connacht, Ireland, around the 1st century. He and his brother Tindi killed Fidig mac Feicc of the Gamanraige of north Connacht on account of his courtship of Medb, the daughter of Eochu Feidlech, High King of Ireland. It is reported that Eochu banished Tindi on account of the killing "to the deserts of Connacht".

Monodar appears later in exile in Ulster and is somehow no longer on good terms with Tindi, as it is told that Tindi was killed in single combat by Monodar during the battle of the Boyne after the former had joined Eochu Feidlech to attack Ulster along with the men of Munster and Sraibgend MacNiuil, the grandfather of Medb's future husband Ailill mac Mata. Here, for this deed Monodar receives the nickname "Mac Cécht", explained as mac écht 'son of slaughter'. He appears to have become one of Conchobar mac Nessa's champions.

The etymological derivation is recalled in the late Middle Irish tract Cóir Anmann ("The Fitness of Names"), item 158:

Maccecht .i. mac dorighne écht n-annsom .i. domharbh sé a dhearbhbhrathair feisin a comhracc .i. Tinne mac Connrach. Rí Connacht tra Tinne intansin & domharbh Monodhar mac Conrach é. Conid iarsin n-echt sin doríne Monodhar tucadh 'Maccecht' fair. Conodhur proprium nomen eius.
“Maccecht, that is, a son (macc) that committed the cruellest homicide (écht), for he killed in combat his own brother, even Tinne son of Connra. Now Tinne was at that time king of Connaught, and Monodar, son of Connra, killed him, whereupon for that homicide which Monodar had perpetrated (the name) Macc-echt was given him. Conodar was his proper name."

A Conadar mac Cécht also makes brief appearances as a chieftain and champion of Medb's retinue in Ulster Cycle tales of the Glenmasan manuscript (15th century).
