= Banshenchas =

Medieval text

An Banshenchas (literally "the woman lore") is a medieval text which collects brief descriptions of prominent women in Irish legend and history into a poetic narrative.

Unlike much of early Irish literature, An Banshenchas may be attributed to a specific author and date. The introduction of the poem states that Gilla Mo Dutu Úa Caiside, of Ard Brecáin in Meath, composed it in 1147.

== Content ==
An Banshenchas is framed in a historical context and starts with Eve and other biblical women, moves to the legendary women of Irish mythology such as Étaín and Emer, then completes with later-day characters who are almost certainly historical, including a few women of the Hiberno-Norse aristocracy.

The references to each of the characters within are short; a few lines at most. For example, in regard to some early biblical figures:

Adam, Seth, pious Sili and Cain were the four first men who propagated multitudes. Eve, Olla, Pib and Pithib (women of power in the eternal world) bore the beautiful race: prosperous before the Flood and miserable afterwards. Eve was the only wife of mighty Adam. Olla was spouse of blameless Seth. Pib was the name of the wife of guilty Cain. She did not avoid evil. Pithib was wife of Sili of the prophets. Whiter than foam was her body.

Or regarding some of the legendary women of Ireland:

Etain was wife of Eochu Aireman, Esa was her daughter, evil were her rites. Her name is given to a lofty spot, allied by her crimes to pollution. Mes Buachalla was Esa's daughter. By her methods mariners were coarsened.

The stories of some of these women are known from other sources, ranging from the Book of Genesis, to the Wooing of Etain to other, less-well known sources. Some of the names within An Banshenchas are today just names that hint at stories that are long-lost but were known to Ó Caiside and his contemporaries.

== Manuscripts ==
Copies of An Banshenchas are found in the Book of Leinster, Leabhar Ua Maine, and the Great Book of Lecan. Like the dinsenchas ("place lore") poems, the banshenchas poems are accompanied by prose commentary probably of a slightly later date.
