= Nemglan =

Nemglan is a supernatural figure who appears as a minor character in the Togail Bruidne Dá Derga, or "The Destruction of Da Derga's Hostel", a tale from Irish mythology which survives in versions from the 12th century onward. Little is known about him, as he is mentioned only in this tale, but he is called a birdman or king of the birds. His name appears to be Old Irish for 'heavenly clean' or 'unclean'. Nemglan "appeared to the heroine Mess Búachalla in the form of a bird and seduced her", fathering Conaire Mór, the high king of Ireland.
