= British Library, MS Egerton 1782 =

Irish manuscript housed in London

Egerton MS 1782 is the index title of an early sixteenth-century Irish vellum manuscript housed in the Egerton Collection of the British Library, London.

== Overview ==
The compilation dates from c. 1517 and is the work of several scribes of the Ó Maolconaire (anglicised: O'Mulconry), a learned family of lawyers and historians, known also for compiling Royal Irish Academy MS 23 N 10 later in the century.

In spite of its relatively late date (compared to, for instance, the Book of Leinster, Lebor na hUidre or the Yellow Book of Lecan), it is one of the most important documents for the study of early Irish literature. Some texts, such as Aislinge Oenguso, are preserved nowhere else.

== The Texts of Egerton MS 1782 ==
Here follow some of the texts found in the manuscript:

- Necrology for Art Buidhe mac Domhnaill Riabhaigh, f. 3-4.
- Amra Choluim Chille (incomplete), f. 9b.
- Baile Bricín. f. 17a
- Forfess Fer Falgae, f. 19r^{a-b}.
- Verba Scáthaige, f. 19v^{a-b}.
- Echtra Chondla, f. 19v^{b}-20r^{b}
- Seilg Sléibhe na mBan "The Chase of Sliabh na mBan (Slievenaman)", f. 20 b 1.
- Tesmolta Cormaic 7 Aided Finn, f. 24r^{b}-25r^{b}
- Airem muintire Finn, f. 25r^{b}-v^{b}
- Imthechta Tuaithe Luchra ocus Aided Fergusa / Echtra Fhergusa maic Léti, f. 30v^{a}-34v^{a}.
- Aided Diarmata meic Fergusa Cherrbeóil, f. 37r^{a}-40v^{b}
- Miscellaneous prose material, f. 40b^{2}, 41a^{1}, including reference to the battle of Ard Rathain between Néide mac Onchú and Eidhean mac Cléirigh.
- "Trí túatha fuilet i nhÉrinn" (prose), f. 44a.
- "Eol dam aided, erctha gním" (poem), f. 44a^{1}.
- "Cormac and Ciarnat" (prose introduction and poem), f. 44 b.
- Suidigud Tige Midchuarta, f. 45v.
- Fulacht na Morrígna, f. 46a.
- The Colloquy between Fintan and the Hawk of Achill, f. 47a.^{1}-49b^{1}.
- Dúan in chóicat cest, poem, f. 49v-50v.
- Cinaed húa hArtacáin, poem, f. 52a.
- Cinaed húa hArtacáin, poem, f. 53b.
- Eochaid Eolach ua Céirín, Apraid a éolchu Elga, f. 53v^{a}-54r^{b}.
- Two Middle Irish poems, f. 56a.
- Egerton Annals: Mionannala, f. 56-64.
- Cath Cairn Chonaill, f. 59v-61r
- Longes mac n-Uislenn / Longes mac Uisnig, f. 67r-69v.
- Tochmarc Ferbe (including episode 'Togail Duin Geirg'), f. 69v-70r.
- Aislinge Oenguso, f. 70r-71v
- Echtra Nera / Táin Bé Aingen, f. 71v-73v.
- De Chophur in dá Muccida, f. 73v-76v.
- Táin Bó Regamna, f. 76v-77v.
- Compert Chonchobair (version 2), f. 77v-78v.
- Compert Chon Culainn / Feis Tige Becfoltaig (two versions), f. 78v-80r.
- Táin Bó Dartada, f. 80r-81r.
- Táin Bó Regamain, f. 81r-82r.
- Táin Bó Flidais, f. 82r-82v.
- Táin Bó Fraích, f. 82v-87v.
- Do Faillsigud Tána Bó Cúailnge, f. 87v.
- Táin Bó Cúailnge (Recension II), f. 88r-105v, with a gap at f. 98.
- Tochmarc Étaine (middle part, introducing Togail Bruidne Da Derga), f. 106r^{a}-108v^{b}
- Togail Bruidne Dá Derga, f. 108v^{b}-123v^{b}.
- Imram Curraig Maíle Dúin (fragments from the prose text), f. 124r-125v.
- Eachtra an Mhadra Mhaeoil "The Adventures of the Crop-eared Dog."
- Seacht n-Urgarta Rígh Temruch "Seven prohibitions of the king of Tara"

== Sources ==
- Flower, Robin (ed.). Catalogue of Irish manuscripts in the British Library, formerly the British Museum. 2 vols: vol 2. London, 1926. 259-98.
