= Nuadu Necht =

High King of Ireland

Nuadu Necht ("the pure"), son of Sétna Sithbac, a descendant of Crimthann Coscrach, of the Laigin, was, according to medieval Irish legend and historical tradition, a High King of Ireland. He came to power after killing his predecessor, Eterscél, and ruled for six months, at the end of which he was killed by Eterscél's son Conaire Mór.

The Lebor Gabála Érenn synchronises his reign with that of the Roman emperor Augustus (27 BC – AD 14), and after the birth of Christ, and makes him contemporary with legendary provincial kings Conchobar mac Nessa, Cairbre Nia Fer and Ailill mac Máta. The chronology of Geoffrey Keating's Foras Feasa ar Éirinn dates his reign to 64–63 BC, and that of the Annals of the Four Masters to 111–110 BC. The Four Masters combine his reign with that of Ér, Orba, Ferón and Fergna centuries before, to make a whole year in their chronology.

In the Fenian Cycle he is an ancestor of Fionn mac Cumhaill: his son Baoisgne was the great-great-grandfather of Cumhall (mac Treunmor mac Suaelt mac Eltan mac Baoisgne mac Nuada Necht). Sometimes the father of the druid Tadg mac Nuadat, whose daughter, Muirne, is Fionn's mother is mistaken as Nuadu Nect, when it is in fact Nuada Airgetlám of the Tuatha Dé Danann. He is also said to have fathered Bascine, the ancestor of Finn's father, Cumhal mac Trenmor.

Preceded by Eterscél	High King of Ireland; LGE 1st century AD; FFE 64–63 BC; AFM 111–110 BC	Succeeded by Conaire Mór
