= Éadaoin (name) =

Éadaoin (pronounced [ˈeːd̪ˠiːnʲ]; Old Irish: Étaín) is an Irish feminine given name. It is sometimes anglicised as Aideen.

Étaín is the name of a heroine from Irish mythology, and is recorded as being borne by several women between the 12th and 15th century in the Irish annals. It is still in use in 21st century Ireland.

== Notable people ==
=== Eadaoin ===
- Eadaoin Ní Challarain, slalom canoer, born 1975.

=== Étaín ===
- Étaín, heroine of Tochmarc Étaíne, originally a sun goddess.
- Étaín Fholtfhind, "of the fair hair", a dweller of the sidhe (fairy mound), i.e., a member of the Tuatha Dé Danann; also said to be lover or wife of Oscar son of Oisín.
- Eataine Ní Egrai, died 1104.
- Etaín Ni Cuinn, Queen of Munster, died 1188.
- Étaín Ní hEghra, died 1225.
- Étaín Ní Carrthaigh, died 1243.
- Étaín Ní Flannacan, died 1263.
- Étaín Níc Uidhir, died 1328.
- Étaín Bean Uí Flannacan, died 1392.
- Étaín Ní Concobhair, 1393.
- Étaín Bean Uí Samradhain, 1467.
- Étaín Óge Níc Uidhir, died 1475.
- Étaín Bean Uí Conchobair Duinn, died 1476.

== See also ==
- List of Irish-language given names
