= Eterscél Mór =

Ancient high king of Ireland

Eterscél Mór ("the great"), Son of Eogan MacAilella, grandson of Ailill Anglonnach MacIar, great-grandson of Íar mac Dedad, a descendant of Óengus Tuirmech Temrach, of the Érainn of Munster was, according to mediaeval Irish legend and historical tradition, a High King of Ireland during the first century BC or first century AD. He succeeded Eochu Airem.

He features in the Middle Irish saga Togail Bruidne Dá Derga (the Destruction of Dá Derga's Hostel). He had no children, and it was prophesied that a woman of unknown race would bear him a son. He found and forcibly married the beautiful Mess Búachalla, daughter of Étaín and the former High King Eochu Feidlech (or, in Tochmarc Étaíne, his brother Eochu Airem and his daughter by Étaín), who, because of her incestuous conception, had been exposed, but found, and brought up by a herdsman and his wife. One night, in Eterscél's house, she was visited by an unknown man who flew in her skylight in the form of a bird, and she had his child, the future High King Conaire Mór, who was brought up as Eterscél's son.

Eterscél ruled for five or six years, at the end of which he was killed by Nuadu Necht in the battle of Aillenn. The Lebor Gabála Érenn synchronises his reign with that of the Roman emperor Augustus (27 BC – AD 14) and the birth of Christ, and makes him contemporary with legendary provincial kings Conchobar mac Nessa, Cairbre Nia Fer, Cú Roí and Ailill mac Máta. The chronology of Geoffrey Keating's Foras Feasa ar Éirinn dates his reign to 70–64 BC, that of the Annals of the Four Masters to 116–111 BC.

Preceded by Eochu Airem	High King of Ireland; LGE 1st century BC/1st century AD; FFE 70–64 BC; AFM 116–111 BC	Succeeded by Nuadu Necht
