= Dúan in chóicat cest =

Medieval school poem in Middle Irish

"Dúan in chóicat cest" ("a poem in fifty questions") is a medieval school poem in Middle Irish, also known by its incipit "Iarfaigid lib cóecait cest."

== Overview ==
The poem was sourced from British Library, MS Egerton 1782 and first published by Kuno Meyer in Zeitschrift für celtische Philologie in 1903.

The text is in the form of fifty questions on Old Testament history and theology. Notable features include:

- The claim that Elijah and Enoch are unhappy in Paradise
- the use of the name Seiri or Seiria for China, derived from Greek Serica.
- The claim of Cain as inventor of agriculture

== See also ==
- Irish poetry
