= Étaín =

- Mythological Cycle character
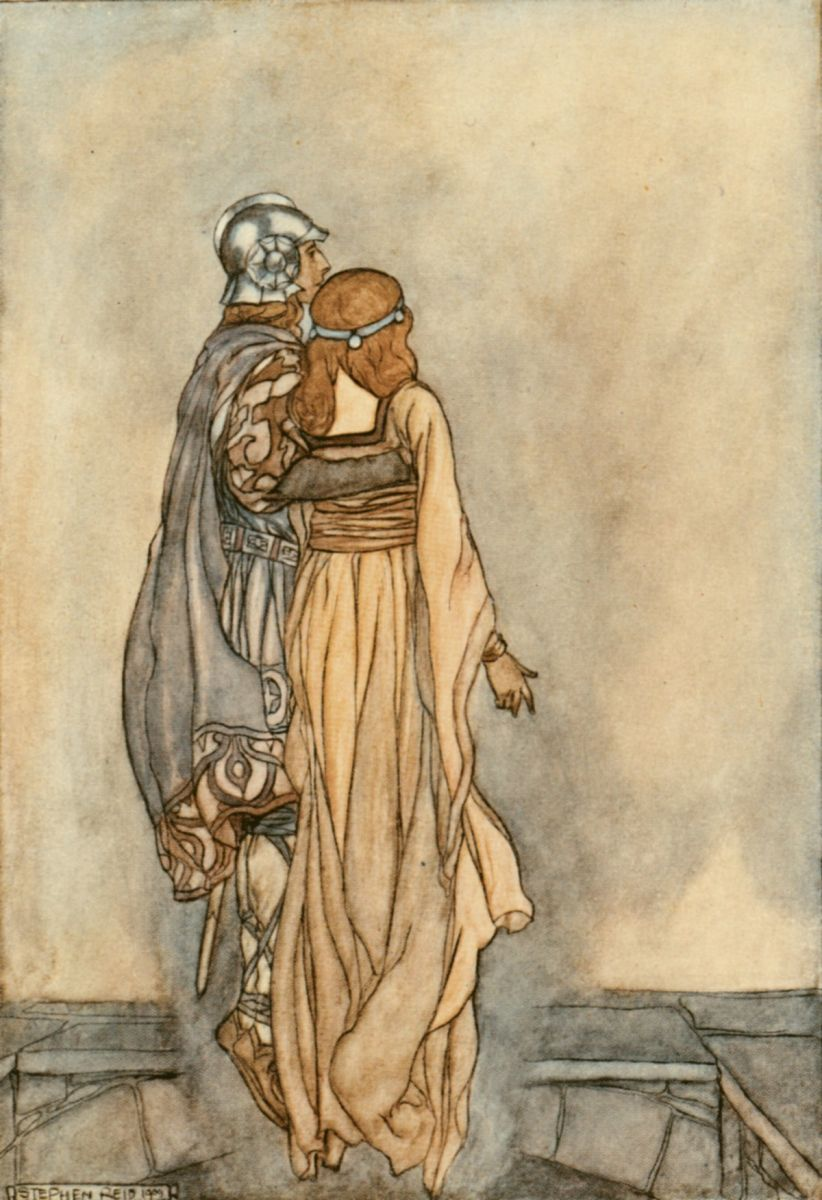
- Étaín and Midir, illustration by Stephen Reid in T. W. Rolleston's The High Deeds of Finn (1910)

In-universe information
- Aliases: Édaín, Eddin, Jédin
- Gender: female
- Family: Ailill
- Spouses: Eochaid Feidlech, Midir
- Children: Étaín Óg

Étaín or Édaín (Modern Irish spelling: Éadaoin) is a figure of Irish mythology, best known as the heroine of Tochmarc Étaíne (The Wooing of Étaín), one of the oldest stories of the Mythological Cycle. She also figures in the Middle Irish Togail Bruidne Dá Derga (The Destruction of Da Derga's Hostel). T. F. O'Rahilly identified her as a sun goddess.

== Name ==
The name Étaín (Old Irish pronunciation: [ˈeːd̪aːi̯nʲ]) is alternately spelt as Edain, Aideen, Etaoin, Éadaoin, Aedín, or Adaon. It is derived from a diminutive form of Old Irish ét, "passion, jealousy". She is sometimes known by the epithet Echraide ("horse rider"), suggesting links with horse deities and figures such as the Welsh Rhiannon and the Gaulish Epona. In Tochmarc Étaíne Midir names her Bé Find (Fair Woman). However, the poem embedded in the text, "A Bé Find in ragha lium" may be an older, unrelated composition that was appended to the story later.

== Genealogy ==
In Tochmarc Étaine, Étaín is the daughter of Ailill, king of the Ulaid. A slightly different genealogy is told in Togail Bruidne Dá Derga (The Destruction of Da Derga's Hostel). Here she is the daughter of Étar (described as king of the cavalcade of the elfmounds), and marries the High King Eochaid Feidlech. They have a daughter, called Étaín Óg (Étaín the Younger), who marries Cormac, king of Ulster. She bears him a daughter, Mess Buachalla, but no sons. Cormac abandons Mess Buachalla, but she is found and brought up by a herdsman. When she grows up she marries the High King Eterscél and becomes the mother of Conaire Mor. In genealogical tracts she is said to have been the wife of the Ulster prince Cormac Cond Longas. Elsewhere Étaín, called Eadon the poetess, appears to be a daughter of Dian Cécht. Similarly, the Etain mentioned in the Second Battle of Moytura is the mother of Carpre the poet who satirizes and shames the Fomorians.

== Tochmarc Étaine ==
When Midir of the Tuatha Dé Danann falls in love with and marries Étaín, Midir's rejected first wife Fúamnach becomes jealous and casts a series of spells on her. First Fúamnach turns Étaín into a pool of water, then into a worm, (in some versions a snake) and then into a beautiful scarlet fly. Midir does not know that the fly is Étaín, but it becomes his constant companion, and he has no interest in women. Fúamnach then creates a wind that blows the fly away and does not allow it to alight anywhere but the rocks of the sea for seven years.

Eventually it lands on the clothes of Óengus, who recognises it as Étaín, but he is at war with Midir and cannot return her to him. He makes her a little chamber with windows so she can come and go, and carries the chamber with him wherever he goes. But Fúamnach hears of this and creates another wind which blows her away from him for another seven years. Eventually the fly falls into a glass of wine. The wine is swallowed (together with the fly) by the wife of Étar, an Ulster chieftain, in the time of Conchobar mac Nessa. She becomes pregnant, and Étain is reborn, one thousand and twelve years after her first birth. Many modern readers of "The Wooing of Etaine" assume that "fly" must mean butterfly or dragonfly, but the Irish word clearly translates as fly (or beetle). Since there are both butterflies and dragonflies in Ireland and specific Irish words for both, it is clear that the creature she becomes is actually a fly.

When she grows up, Étaín marries the High King, Eochaid Airem. Their meeting is related in the opening episode of Togail Bruidne Dá Derga. Eochaid's brother Ailill Angubae falls in love with her, and begins to waste away. Eventually he admits to Étaín that he is dying of love for her, and she agrees to sleep with him to save his life. They arrange to meet, but Midir casts a spell which causes Ailill to fall asleep and miss the assignation. However, Étaín meets a man there who looks and speaks like Ailill but does not sleep with him because she senses that it is not actually him. This happens three times, and the man who looks like Ailill reveals himself to be Midir, and tells her of her previous life as his wife. She refuses to leave with him unless her husband gives her permission. She then returns to Ailill to find him cured.

Midir then goes to Eochaid in his true form and asks to play fidchell, a board game, with him. He offers a stake of fifty horses, loses, and gives Eochaid the horses as promised. Midir challenges him to more games, for higher stakes, and keeps losing. Eochaid, warned by his foster-father that Midir is a being of great power, sets him a series of tasks, including laying a causeway over Móin Lámrige, which he performs reluctantly. He then challenges Eochaid to one final game of fidchell, the stake to be named by the winner. This time, Midir wins, and demands an embrace and a kiss from Étaín. Eochaid agrees that he will have it if he returns in a month's time. A month later Midir returns. He puts his arms around Étaín, and they turn into swans and fly off.

Eochaid and his men begin digging at the mound of Brí Léith where Midir lives. Midir appears to them and tells Eochaid his wife will be restored to him the following day. The next day fifty women who all look like Étain appear, and an old hag tells Eochaid to choose which one is his wife. He chooses one, but Midir later reveals that Étaín had been pregnant when he had taken her, and the girl he has chosen is her daughter. Eochaid is horrified, because he has slept with his own daughter, who became pregnant with a girl. When the girl is born she is exposed, but she is found and brought up by a herdsman and his wife. She later becomes the mother of the High King Conaire Mor.

== Dindsenchas ==
Two episodes from the Tochmarc Étaíne are also recounted in the metrical Dindsenchas. The Dindsenchas poem on Rath Esa recounts how Eochaid Airenn won back Étaín. The poem on Ráth Crúachan refers to Midir's abduction of Étaín.

== Togail Bruidne Dá Derga ==
The Middle Irish text Togail Bruidne Dá Derga (Recension II) includes a rather lengthy and colourful depiction of her in the episode of her encounter with King Echu in Brí Léith:

[...] con-accai in mnaí for ur in tobair & cír chuirrél argit co n-ecor de ór acthe oc folcud a l-luing argit & ceithri h-eóin óir furri & gleorgemai beccai di charrmogul chorcrai h-i forfleascuib na luingi. Brat cas corcra fo loí chaín aicthe. Dúalldai airgdidi ecoirside de ór oibinniu isin bratt. Léne lebur-chulpatach isí chotutlemon dei sítiu úainide fo derginliud óir impi. Túagmíla ingantai di ór & airget fora bruindi & a formnaib & a gúallib isind léne di cach leith. Taitned fria in grían co b-ba forderg dona feraib tuídhleach ind óir frisin n- gréin asin títiu uainidi. Dá trilis n- órbuidi fora cind. Fige ceithri n-dúal ceachtar n-dé, & mell for rind cach dúail. Ba cosmail leó dath ind foiltsin fri barr n-ailestair h-i samrad nó fri dergór íar n- dénam a datha.

"[...] [Echu] saw a woman at the edge of the well. She had a bright silver comb with gold ornamentation on it, and she was washing from a silver vessel with four gold birds on it and bright, tiny gems of crimson carbuncle on its rims. There was a crimson cloak of beautiful, curly fleece round her, fastened with a silver brooch coiled with lovely gold; her long-hooded tunic was of stiff, smooth, green silk embroidered with red gold, and there were wondrous animal brooches of gold and silver at her breast and on her shoulders. When the sun shone upon her, the gold would glisten very red against the green silk. Two tresses of yellow gold she had, and each tress was a weaving of four twists with a globe at the end. Men would say that hair was like the blooming iris in summer or like red gold after it had been burnished."

In equally rapturous style, the narrator proceeds to home in on her physical beauty:

Is and buí oc taithbiuch a fuilt dia folcud & a dá láim tria derc a sedlaig immach. Batar gilithir sneachta n-oenaichde na dí dóit & batar maethchóiri & batar dergithir sían slébe na dá grúad n-glanáilli. Badar duibithir druimne daeil na dá malaich. Batar inand & frais do némannaib a déta ina cind. Batar glasithir buga na dí súil. Batar dergithir partaing na beóil. Batar forarda míne maethgela na dá gúalaind. Batar gelglana sithfhota na méra. Batar fota na láma. Ba gilithir úan tuindi in taeb seng fota tláith mín maeth amal olaind. Batar teithbláithi sleamongeala na dí slíasait. Batar cruindbega caladgela na dí glún. Batar gerrgela indildírgi na dé lurgain. Batar coirdírgi íaráildi na dá sáil. Cid ríagail fo-certa forsna traigthib is ing má 'd-chotad égoir n-indib acht ci tórmaisead feóil ná fortche foraib. Solusruidiud inn éscae ina saeragaid. Urthócbáil úailli ina mínmailgib. Ruithen suirghe ceachtar a dá rígrosc. Tibri ániusa ceachtar a dá grúad, co n-amlud indtibsen do ballaib bithchorcra co n-deirgi fola laíg, & araill eile co solusgili sneachta. Bocmaerdachd banamail ina glór. Cém fosud n-inmálla acci. Tochim ríghnaidi lé. Ba sí trá as caemeam & as áildeam & as córam ad-connarcadar súili doíne de mnáib domain. Ba dóig leó bed a sídaib dí. Ba fria as-breth: cruth cách co h-Étaín. Caem cách co h-Étaín.

"At the well, the woman loosened her hair in order to wash it, and her hands appeared through the opening of the neck of her dress. As white as the snow of a single night her wrists; as tender and even and red as foxglove her clear, lovely cheeks. As black as a beetle's back her brows; a shower of matched pearls her teeth. Hyacinth blue her eyes; Parthian red her lips. Straight, smooth, soft and white her shoulders; pure white and tapering her fingers; long her arms. As white as sea foam her side, slender, long, smooth, yielding, soft as wool. Warm and smooth, sleek and white her thighs; round and small, firm and white her knees. Short and white and straight her shins; fine and straight and lovely her heels. If a rule were put against her feet, scarcely a fault would be found save for her plenitude of flesh or skin. The blushing light of the moon in her noble face; an uplifting of pride in her smooth brows; a gleam of courting each in her two royal eyes. Dimples of pleasure each of her cheeks, where spots red as the blood of a calf alternated with spots the whiteness of shining snow. A gently, womanly dignity in her voice; a steady, stately step, the walk of a queen. She was the fairest and most perfect and most beautiful of all the women in the world; men thought she was of the Síde, and they said of her: 'Lovely anyone until Étain. Beautiful anyone until Étain.'"

=== Silver basin ===
The silver basin (Ir. long) with the four golden birds around it may have symbolic or religious significance. Margaret Dobbs has noted the parallel of the three cups offered by Medb to the Ulster heroes in Fled Bricrenn. Each of these three cups had a bird of greater material value placed on the inside: the bronze cup was fitted out with a bird of findruine, the findruine one with a bird of gold and the gold cup with a bird of gems. Moreover, she points out a possible relationship to examples of late Hallstatt pottery and bronzeware from Central Europe in which figures of aquatic birds were attached to bowls or vases, whether they were specifically designed for religious ceremonies or conveyed religious ideas in more general contexts. She suggests that the literary image may preserve "a memory of well-worship and of rites performed there with sacred vessels marked with magic symbols", possibly against evil magic. Such religious practices and ritual vessels may have reached Ireland between about 600 and 300 BC, when immigration took place in Britain and Ireland. In the light of the sacred significance of swans in early Irish literature, Dobbs also notes the episode's possible relevance to Fúamnach's malevolent spells and Étaín's and Midir's transformation into the shape of swans.

== Additional references ==
Aideen's Grave is a megalithic portal tomb located in Binn Éadair, according to legend this was her final resting place. This legend is the subject of the poem 'Aideen's Grave' by Samuel Ferguson.

== See also ==
- Étaín (Irish name)
- List of solar deities
