= Mess Búachalla =

Mother of an ancient high king of Ireland

Mess Búachalla (the cow-herder's foundling) was the mother of the High King Conaire Mór in Irish mythology during the first century BC or first century AD.

Her origins are somewhat confused. In the tale Tochmarc Étaíne she was the daughter of the High King Eochu Airem and his own daughter, whom he slept with after being fooled into believing she was her mother Étaín. (In the Banshenchas Eochu and Étaín's daughter was named as Esa). In Togail Bruidne Dá Derga, she was the daughter of Eochu's brother Eochu Feidlech and Étaín herself.

Because of her incestuous conception her father ordered her exposed, but she was found and brought up by a herdsman and his wife. She grew up to be very beautiful, and was forcibly married by the High King Eterscél. One night in Eterscél's house, she was visited by an unknown man who flew in her skylight in the form of a bird and she had his son, Conaire Mór, who was brought up as Eterscél's son.
