= Corlea Trackway =

Iron Age trackway in Ireland

- Bóthar Chorr Liath (Irish)
- The Danes’ Road
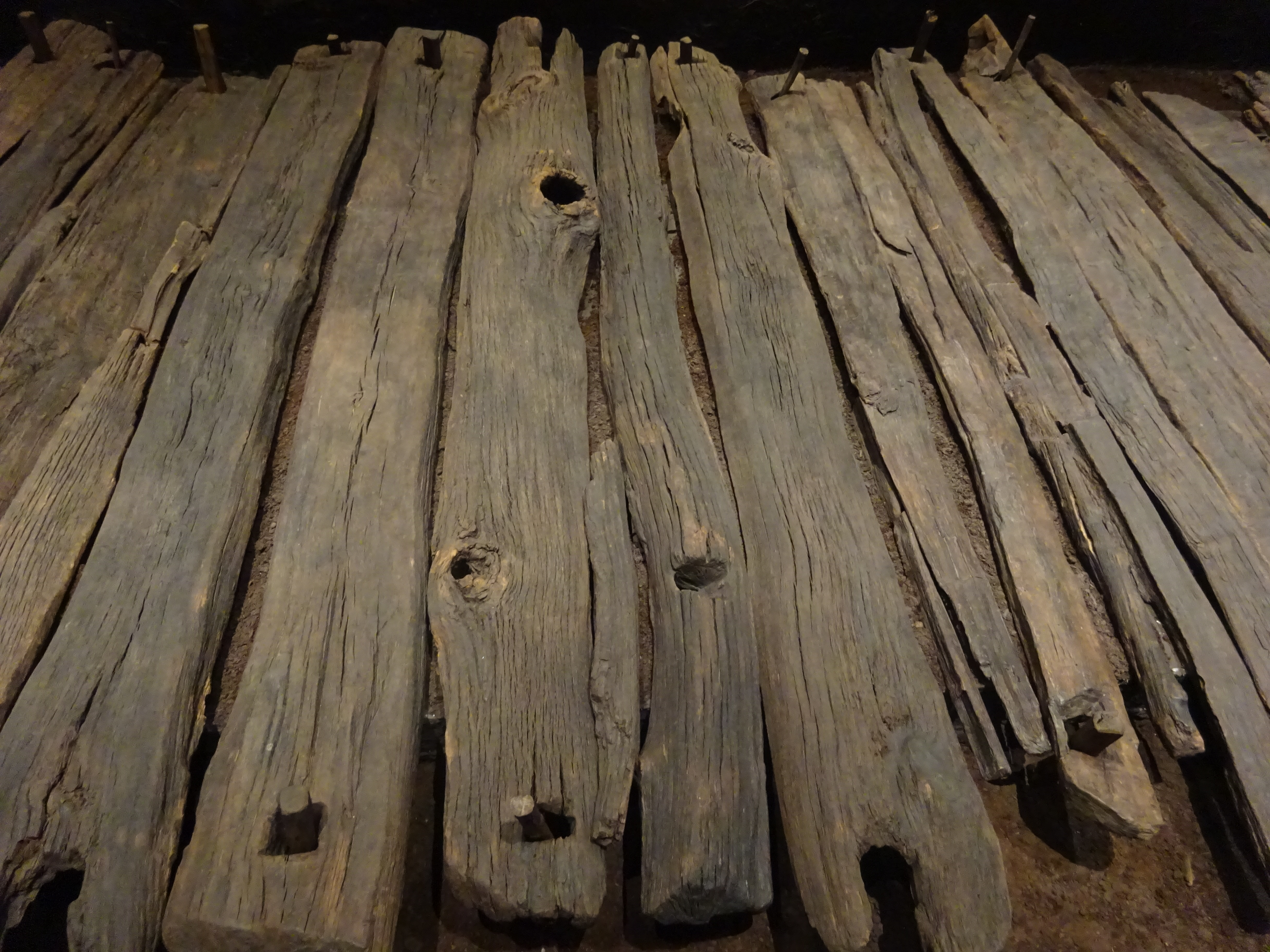
- Several planks

- Location within Ireland
- 53°37′36″N 7°51′12″W
- Type: Causeway
- Cultures: Gaelic Ireland
- Location: Near Keenagh, County Longford, Ireland
- Region: Midlands of Ireland

History
- Built: 148–147 BC

Site notes
- Material: oak beams
- Elevation: 52 m (171 ft)
- Length: 1 kilometre (0.62 mi)
- Width: 3.2 metres (10 ft)
- Owner: Office of Public Works
- Public access: Yes
- Website: heritageireland.ie/places-to-visit/corlea-trackway-visitor-centre/

Designations
- Designation: National Monument #677

National monument of Ireland
- Official name: Corlea
- Reference no.: 677

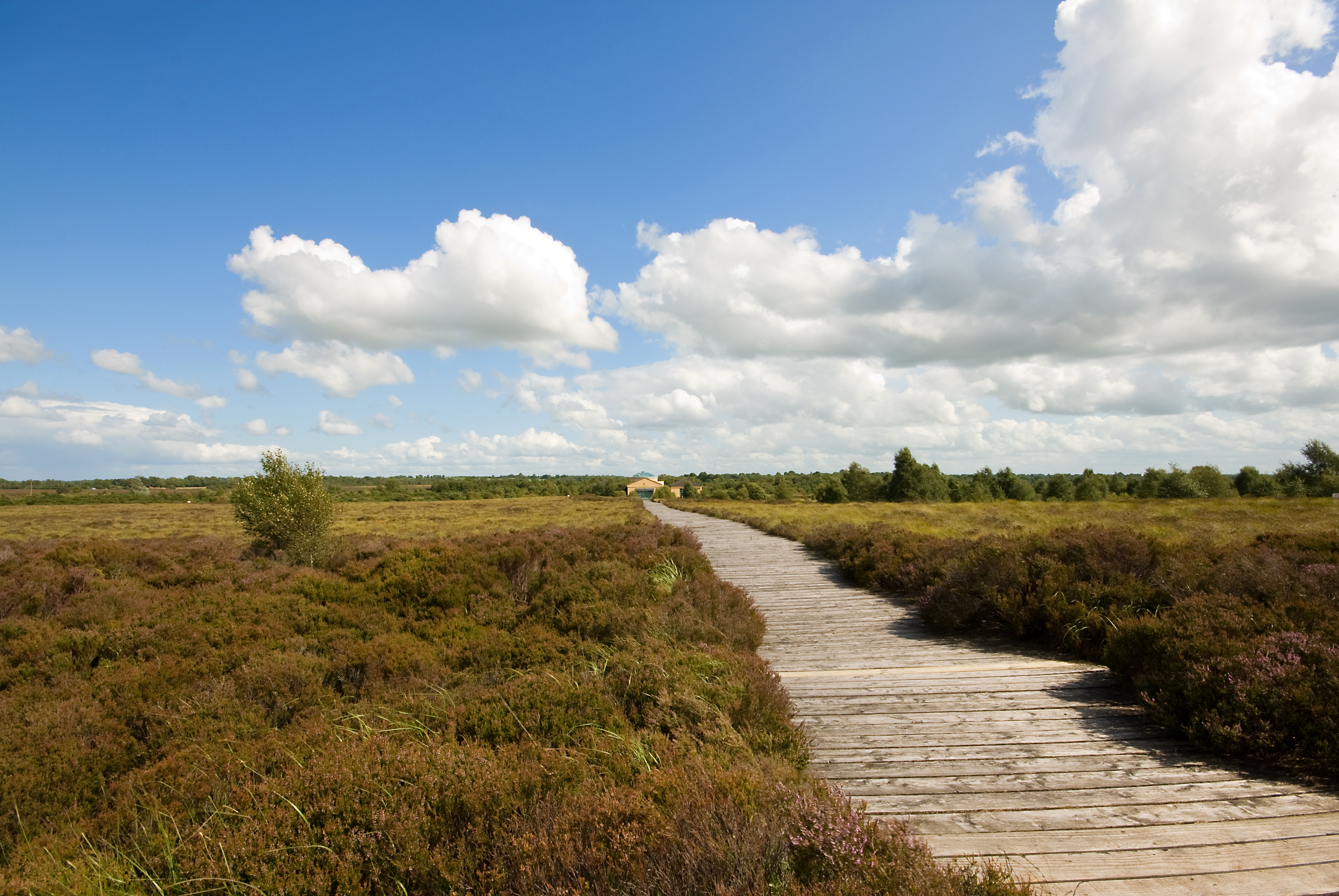
The reconstructed Corlea Trackway in 2009

The Corlea Trackway (Irish: Bóthar Chorr Liath) is an Iron Age trackway, or togher, near the village of Keenagh, south of Longford, County Longford, in Ireland. It was known locally as the Danes' Road. It was constructed from oak planks in 148–147 BC, making it contemporary with the Siege of Carthage.

The trackway is situated in an area which is the site of industrial-scale mechanised peat harvesting by the Bord na Móna, principally to supply the peat-fired power stations of the Electricity Supply Board. While today a generally flat and open landscape, in the Iron Age it was covered by bog, quicksand, and ponds, surround by dense woodlands of birch, willow, hazel and alder while higher ground was covered by oak and ash. The terrain was dangerous and impassible for much of the year.

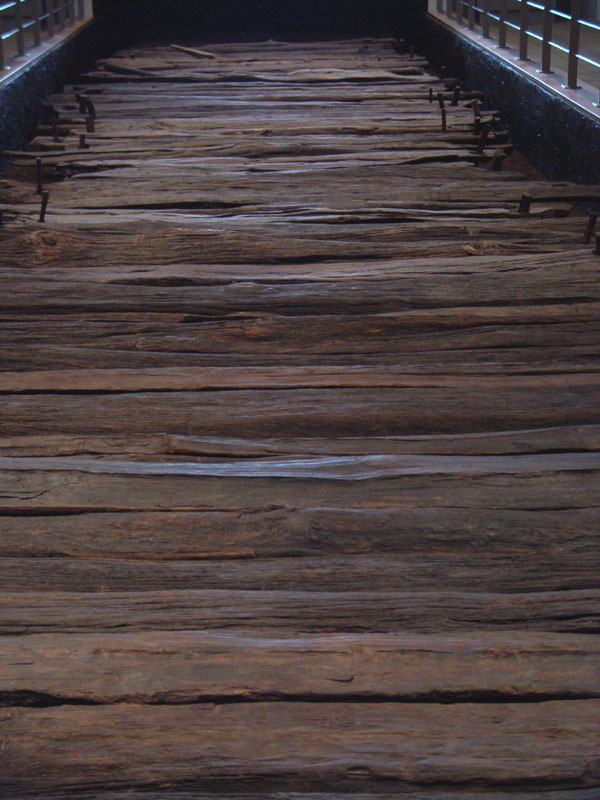
Part of the recovered trackway

In 1984, timbers recovered from Corlea were radiocarbon dated to the Iron Age, rather than the Bronze Age as had been expected, and an archaeological project was established under the leadership of Professor Barry Raftery to investigate the site before it was destroyed by peat-digging. Excavations to 1991 in Corlea bog revealed 59 toghers in an area of around 125 hectares and further work has raised the total to 108 with a further 76 in the nearby Derryoghil bog.

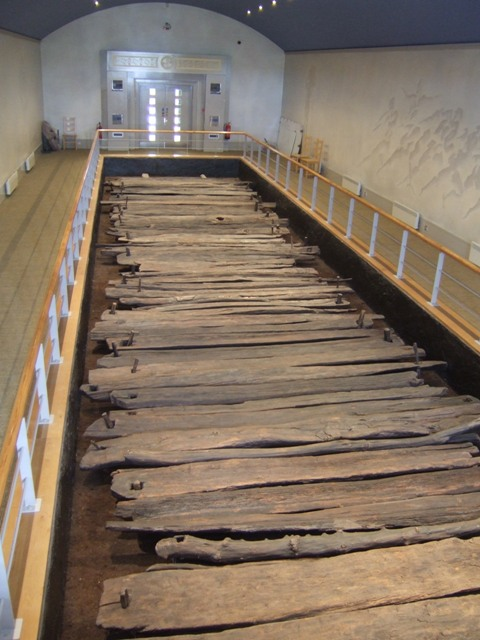
Part of the recovered trackway

The majority of these toghers are constructed from woven hurdles laid on heaped brushwood on top of the surface, built to be used by people on foot. Four, including Corlea 1, the Corlea Trackway proper, are corduroy roads, built from split planks laid on top of raised rails and suitable for wheeled traffic. The Corlea Trackway is made from oak planks 3 to 3.5 metres (9.8 to 11.5 ft) long and around 15 cm (5.9 in) thick laid on rails around 1.2 metres (3 ft 11 in) apart. The road was at least 1 km (0.62 mi) long. Dendrochronological study suggests that the timber used in construction was felled in late 148 BC or early in 147 BC and the road built then. Raftery estimated that the sleepers alone amount to a 300 large oak trees, or a thousand wagon-loads, with a similar volume of birch for the rails. The Corlea Trackway ended on a small island, from which a second trackway, excavated in 1957 and since radiocarbon dated also to 148 BC, again around 1 kilometre long, connected to dry land on the far side of the bog. The construction of the roadway required a great deal of labour, comparable to that used in the construction of ritual monuments such as barrows.

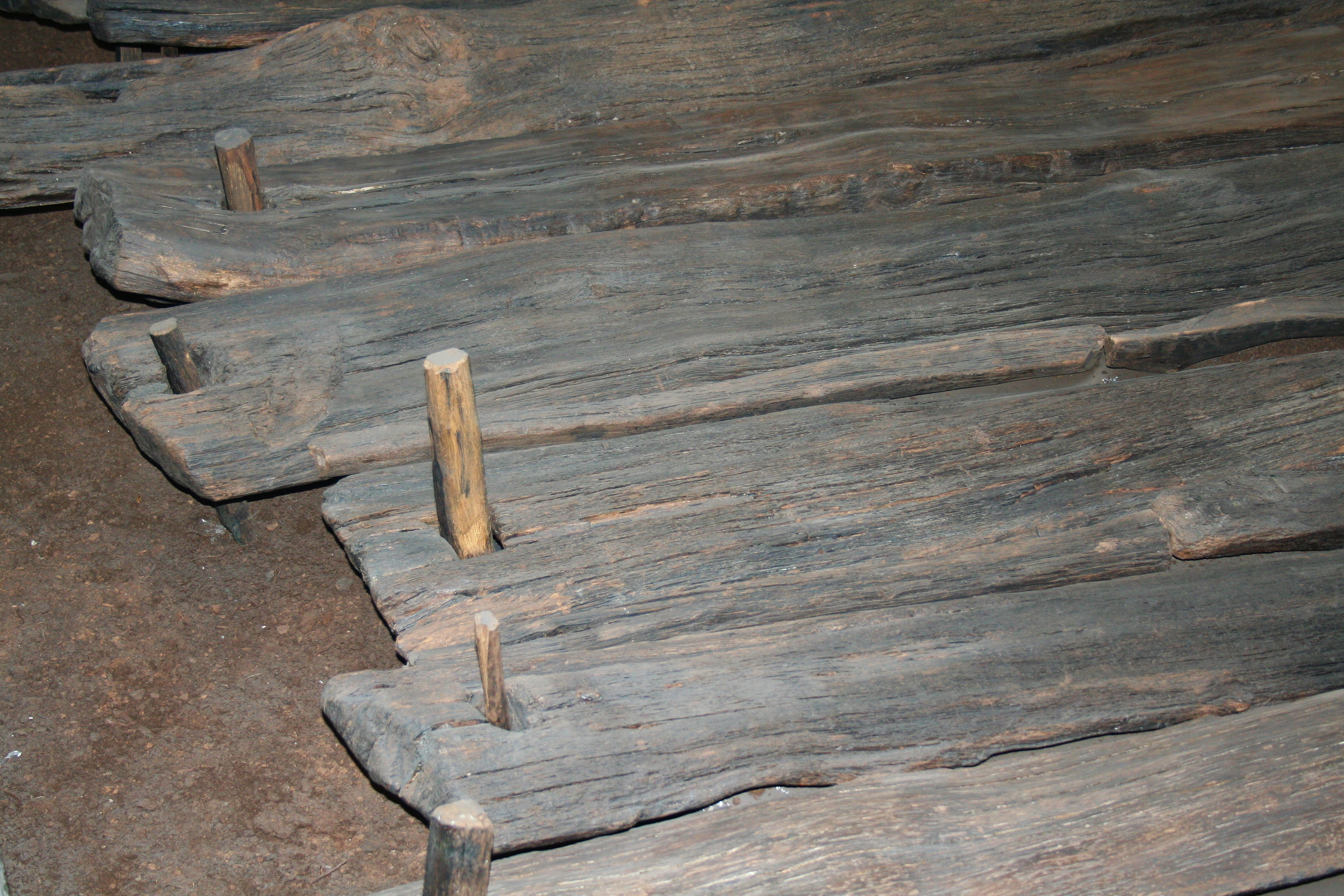
Wooden planks and nails

The purpose of the Corlea Trackway is uncertain. For the smaller toghers, O'Sullivan remarks that "there is a growing sense that these were not structures designed to cross the bog, but to get into the bog". Massive structures such as the Corlea Trackway may also have served to get into the bog, perhaps for ritual purposes, rather than merely to cross it. Whatever its purpose, the roadway was usable for only a few years. Gradually covered by the rising bog and sinking under its own weight, it was covered by the bog within a decade, and perhaps less, where it remained preserved for two millennia.

The Corlea Trackway, seemingly constructed in a single year, has suggested comparisons with the Irish language tale Tochmarc Étaíne (The Wooing of Étaín), where King Eochu Airem sets Midir tasks such as planting a forest and building a road across a bog where none had ever been before at a place called Móin Lámraige.

== See also ==
- Sweet Track
- History of roads in Ireland
- R392 road (Ireland)
- Mayne Bog ancient trackway in Co Westmeath uncovered in 2005. It dated back to 1200BC-820BC and was made of planks of oak some 4.4m wide, running for at least 675m. It was destroyed by peat extraction in 2013.
