= Máel Muire mac Céilechair =

Irish cleric and scribe (died 1106)

Máel Muire ("servant of Mary") mac Céilechair (died 1106) was an Irish cleric of the monastery of Clonmacnoise, County Offaly, and one of the principal scribes of the manuscript Lebor na hUidre.

He came from a prominent clerical family with links to Clonmacnoise going back six centuries. He was the son of Céilechar Mugdornach (of the Mugdornai, a people of early Ireland), bishop of Clonmacnoise; son of Conn ma mBocht ("of the poor"), head of the Céli Dé and an anchorite of the same monastery, d. 1059; son of Joseph, a confessor at Clonmacnoise, d. 1022; son of Dúnchad, bishop of Clonmacnoise, d. 953; son of Égertach, superior of Ecclais Becc, d. 893; grandson of Eogan, an anchorite of Clonmacnoise, d. 845; son of Aedagán, abbot of Louth, d. 834; son of Torbach, scribe, lector and abbot of Armagh, d. 807; son of Gormán, successor of Mochta of Louth, who died in 753 while on a pilgrimage to Clonmacnoise. Another Gormán of the Mugdornai, who according to the Annals of Clonmacnoise was an ancestor of Máel Muire, also died while on pilgrimage to Clonmacnoise in 610.

Máel Muire was one of the three scribes who worked on the manuscript Lebor na hUidre, the earliest and one of the most important collections of early Irish literature. He wrote his name on the manuscript in two marginal probationes pennae (pen tests), and comparison of the handwriting identifies him as one of the two scribes who wrote the original manuscript, which was later amended by a third hand. His contribution amounts to roughly 60% of the surviving manuscript. A note in the manuscript, made in 1345, credits him as the one who "copied and searched out this book from various books".

The Annals of the Four Masters record his death in 1106 in a Viking raid on Clonmacnoise.
