= Exposure (infant) =

Practice of abandoning unwanted infants to exposure in the wilderness

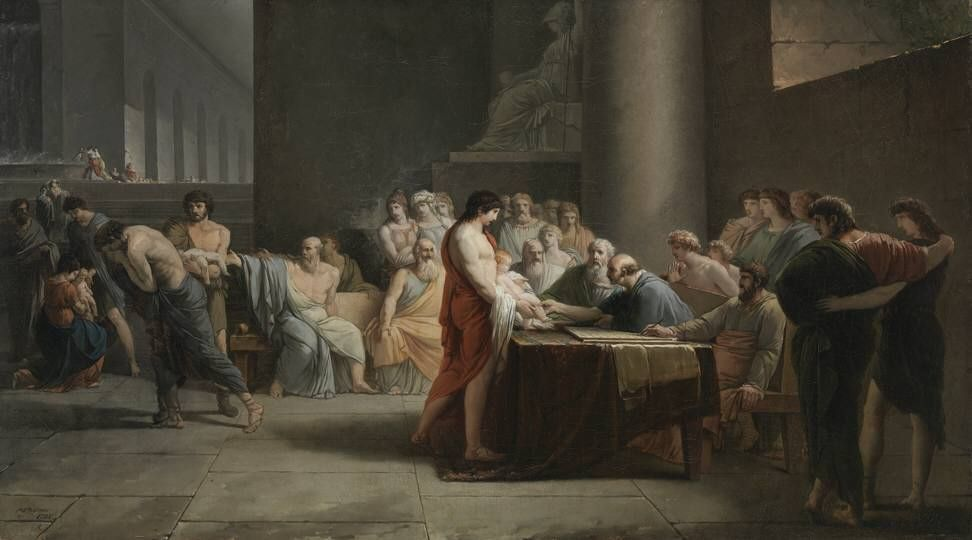
The Selection of Children in Sparta, Jean-Pierre Saint-Ours, small version of 1785, Neue Pinakothek, Munich.

Exposure, or exposition (both ultimately from the Latin expōnō, "to set forth, expose"), is a method of infanticide or child abandonment in which infants are left outside to die. In ancient times, the infants typically either died to hypothermia, starvation, and animal attack, were collected by slavers, or were adopted by those unable to produce children.

== Mythological ==
This form of child abandonment is a recurring theme in mythology, especially among hero births.

Some examples include:

- Sargon, King of Akkad – exposed to the river.
- Karna – exposed to the river.
- Tang Sanzang – exposed to the river on a wooden plank. The historical person he is based on never suffered such a fate.
- Oedipus – exposed in the mountains.
- Paris – exposed at the top of Mount Ida.
- Zāl – exposed in the Alborz mountains.
- Telephus – exposed on Mount Parthenion.
- Atalanta – exposed on Mount Parthenion.
- Perseus – boxed and cast into the sea with his mother, Danaë.
- Romulus and Remus – exposed in a tub to the Tiber River.
- Siegfried – exposed in a glass vessel to the river.
- Ken Arok, Javanese king – exposed to the river.
- Semiramis – exposed in a desert region according to Diodorus Siculus.
- Mess Búachalla - exposed to wild beasts.
- Moses - exposed in a basket to the Nile River.

Otto Rank explores this topic in his book, The Myth of the Birth of the Hero. The exposure, especially in water, "signifies no more and no less than the symbolic expression of birth. The children come out of the water. The basket, box, or receptacle simply means the container, the womb; so that the exposure directly signifies the process of birth". Further, according to Rank, these myths epitomize the natural psychological tension between parent and child. In all these stories there exists "a tendency to represent the parents as the first and most powerful opponents of the hero .... The vital peril, thus concealed in the representation of birth through exposure, actually exists in the process of birth itself. The overcoming of all these obstacles also expresses the idea that the future hero has actually overcome the greatest difficulties by virtue of his birth, for he has victoriously thwarted all attempts to prevent it."

== In Antiquity ==
=== Greece ===
Exposure was widely practiced in ancient Greece. It was advocated by Aristotle in the case of deformity: "As to the exposure of children, let there be a law that no deformed child shall live." Plato also defended infanticide as state policy.

In Sparta, according to Plutarch, in his The Life of Lycurgus:

Offspring was not reared at the will of the father, but was taken and carried by him to a place called Lesche, where the elders of the tribes officially examined the infant, and if it was well-built and sturdy, they ordered the father to rear it, and assigned it one of the nine thousand lots of land; but if it was ill-born and deformed, they sent it to the so‑called Apothetae, a chasm-like place at the foot of Mount Taÿgetus, in the conviction that the life of that which nature had not well equipped at the very beginning for health and strength, was of no advantage either to itself or the state.

However, this story has little other literary support. Modern excavations at the spot have found only adult human bones – it may have been used as a place for execution of criminals.

=== Rome ===
Exposure was extremely widespread and deemed morally acceptable in ancient Rome, especially regarding female children, and according to Jack Lindsay, "more than one daughter was practically never reared" even in large families. The Twelve Tables allowed for the exposure of any notably deformed infants. (Table 4.1) As Christianity gained a foothold in the Roman empire, Christians became known for rescuing exposed infants and raising them. Later, starting with Constantine the Great, Christian emperors began to implement reforms which eventually led to the end of the practice of infant exposure.

In his History of European Morals from Augustus to Charlemagne (1869), William Lecky writes: "It was practised on a gigantic scale with absolute impunity, noticed by writers with the most frigid indifference, and, at least in the case of destitute parents, considered a very venial offence."

== Early Middle Ages ==
During the Early Middle Ages in Europe, the History of European Morals (1869) by Irish historian William Lecky mentions that infant exposure was not punishable by law and was practiced on a large scale and was considered a pardonable offense. In the 8th century, foundling hospitals were opened in Milan, Florence and Rome, among others, to help reduce the deaths of newborns who were subjected to exposure. Church authorities were in charge of these hospitals until the 16th century.

== See also ==
- Feral children in mythology and fiction
- Infanticide
- Abortion
