= Lebor na hUidre =

12th century Irish vellum manuscript

- Royal Irish Academy
- Also known as: Book of the Dun Cow
- Type: Compilation of early Irish literature
- Date: Before 1106 (with later additions)
- Place of origin: Clonmacnoise
- Language(s): Middle Irish, with some Latin words
- Scribe(s): Máel Muire mac Céilechair and two others
- Material: Vellum
- Size: 32cm x 24cm
- Format: Folio
- Condition: Damaged, only 67 pages remaining
- Script: Irish minuscule
- Discovered: 1844

Location of Clonmacnoise in Ireland

Lebor na hUidre (Middle Irish: [ˈl̠ʲeβoɾ n̪a ˈhuðʲɾʲe], LU) or the Book of the Dun Cow (MS 23 E 25) is an Irish vellum manuscript dating to the 12th century. It is the oldest extant manuscript in Irish. It is held in the Royal Irish Academy and is badly damaged: only 67 leaves remain and many of the texts are incomplete. It is named after an anachronistic legend that it was made from the hide of a dun cow by Saint Ciarán of Clonmacnoise.

== History ==
The manuscript is thought to be the work of three scribes, whose handwriting was distinguished by Richard Irvine Best in 1912 and identified with the letters A, M and H. A and M are believed to be contemporary. A began the manuscript and wrote the opening pages of several of the texts, which were continued by M, who Best identified as Máel Muire mac Céilechair meic Cuinn na mBocht, based on matching the handwriting with two marginal probationes pennae or pen tests, in which the scribe wrote his name. A much later note elsewhere in the manuscript names Máel Muire as the person who "wrote and compiled this book from divers[e] books". His murder by Vikings at Clonmacnoise is recorded in the Annals of the Four Masters in 1106, giving us a latest possible date and location for the main body of the manuscript. Some time later, H (named for his addition of two homilies) added a number of new texts and passages, sometimes over erased portions of the original, sometimes on new leaves. Based on orthography and an English loanword, Gearóid Mac Eoin concludes that H wrote in the late 12th or early 13th century.

After the monastery of Clonmacnoise was broken up, the manuscript came into the possession of the O'Donnell dynasty of Donegal who held it until 1359, when it and the lost Leabhar Gearr were used to ransom members of the clan who had been taken prisoner by Cathal Óg Ó Conchobhair Sligigh (d. 3 November 1362). Áed Ruad O'Donnell recovered the manuscript in 1470, and it remained in Donegal at least until 1631, when the compilation of the Annals of the Four Masters was completed. Its location is unknown until 1837, when it was part of a collection owned by Messrs. Hodges & Smith of College Green, Dublin, and was cited by George Petrie in an essay on the History and Antiquities of Tara Hill. The Hodges & Smith collection, 227 manuscripts in all, was purchased by the Royal Irish Academy in 1844.

Joseph O'Longan's lithographic facsimile of the manuscript was published by the RIA in 1870. A diplomatic edition by R. I. Best and Osborn Bergin (Best & Bergin 1929), with the three hands distinguished by different typefaces, was published in 1929. Digital scans of the pages at the Royal Irish Academy have been published on the web by ISOS (Irish Script on Screen).(ISOS & MS 23 E 25)

== Contents ==
The remaining leaves of the manuscript contain the following texts, in various states of preservation:

Notes on known alternative versions and copies of the tales in the text are given in Best & Bergin 1929, pp. xvii–xxxviii

=== Texts from the original manuscript ===
- Sex aetates mundi ["The Six Ages of the World"], incomplete
- Lebor Bretnach ["The British Book"], an Irish translation of the Historia Brittonum, incomplete
- Amra Coluim Chille ["The Eulogy of Columba"], a heavily annotated version of the 7th-century poem by Dallán Forgaill
- Scél Tuain meic Cairill do Finnen Maige Bile ["The Story Tuan mac Cairill told to Finnian of Moville"], in which the history of the invasions of Ireland is related by a survivor of the first invasion (Tuan mac Cairill) to Finnian of Moville, incomplete
- Dá brón flatha nime ["The Two Sorrows of the Kingdom of Heaven"], incomplete
- Mesca Ulad ["The Intoxication of the Ulstermen"], incomplete
- Táin bó Dartada ["The Driving of Dartaid's Cattle"], opening four lines only
- Táin Bó Flidhais ["The Driving of Fliodhais' Cattle"], incomplete
- Immram curaig Mail Dúin ["Voyage of Máel Dúin's currach"], incomplete
- Fís Adomnáin ["The Vision of Adomnán"], a work of vision literature attributed to the 7th-century Irish saint Adomnán
- Tucait innarba na nDessi i mMumain ocus aided Chormaic ["The Cause of the Expulsion of the Déisi into Munster and the Death of Cormac mac Airt"], known as "The Expulsion of the Déisi"
- Táin Bó Cúailnge ["The Cattle Raid of Cooley"], the oldest version of the central epic of the Ulster Cycle, incomplete, contains passages interpolated by H
- Togail bruidne Dá Derga ["The Destruction of Dá Derga's Hostel"], a tale of the 1st-century king Conaire Mór, incomplete, contains passages interpolated by H
- Fled Bricrenn ["Bricriu's Feast"], incomplete, contains passages interpolated by H
- Siaburchapat Con Culaind ["Cúchulainn's Phantom Chariot"], a tale of Saint Patrick, who raises Cúchulainn from hell to convince king Lóegaire mac Néill to convert to Christianity, contains passages interpolated by H
- Fástini Airt meic Cuind ocus a chretem ["The prophesy of Art mac Cuinn and his faith]", in which the 2nd-century king Art mac Cuinn is said to have foreseen the coming of Christianity
- Echtra Condla Chaim meic Cuind Chetchathaig ["The adventure of Connla the Beautiful, son of Conn of the Hundred Battles"], in which the Connla the Ruddy is lured to the otherworld by a fairy woman
- Cethri Arda in Domain ["The Four-Quarters of the World"], incomplete
- Imram Brain mac Febail ["The Voyage of Bran son of Febal"], a fantastic voyage tale, incomplete
- Tochmarc Emire ["The Wooing of Emer"], contains passages interpolated by H
- Compert Con Culainn ["The conception of Cúchulainn"], copied from the lost Book of Druimm Snechta, contains passages interpolated by H
- Tochmarc Étaíne ["The wooing of Étaín"], a mythological tale featuring Aengus and Midir of the Tuatha Dé Danann, incomplete
- Compert Mongáin ["The conception of Mongán"], a tale of a legendary prince, incomplete
- Scel asa mberar combad hé Find mac Cumaill Mongáin ocus aní día fil aided Fothaid Airgdig ["The story by which it is inferred that Mongán was Fionn mac Cumhaill, and the reason for the death of Fothad Airgthech"]
- Scél Mongáin ["The story of Mongán"]
- Tucait baile Mongáin ["The Cause of the Vision of Mongán"]
- Inna hinada hi filet cind erred Ulad ["The places where the heads of the heroes of Ulster are"], a poem

=== Texts added by scribe H ===
- Scéla laí brátha ["Tidings of the Day of Judgement"]
- Scéla na esergi ["Tidings of the Resurrection"]
- Aided Nath Í ocus a adnacol ["The Death of Nath Í and his burial"], a tale of the 5th-century king, Nath Í mac Fiachrach
- Aided Echach meic Maíreda ["The Death of Eochaid mac Maíreda"], a mythological tale of the origin of Lough Neagh
- Fotha catha Cnucha ["The Cause of the Battle of Knock"], a tale concerning the birth of Fionn mac Cumhaill
- Serglige Con Culainn ["The Wasting Sickness of Cúchulainn"], copied from the lost Yellow Book of Slane
- Senchas na relec ["The History of the Burial Places"], an account of the resting places of a number of Irish kings
- Genemain Áeda Sláne ["The Birth of Áed Sláine"]: a tale of the 6th-century king, Áed Sláine
- De genelogia Con Culaind ["The Genealogy of Cúchulainn"]
- Cath Cairnd Chonaill ria Diarmait mac Aeda Sláni for Guari Adni ["The Battle of Carn Conaill between Diarmait son of Áed Sláine and Guaire Aidne]", a tale from the Cycle of the Kings
- Comthoth Lóegairi co cretim ocus a aided ["The conversion of Lóegaire to the faith and his death"], a tale of Saint Patrick
