= Tochmarc Étaíne =

Irish Mythological Text

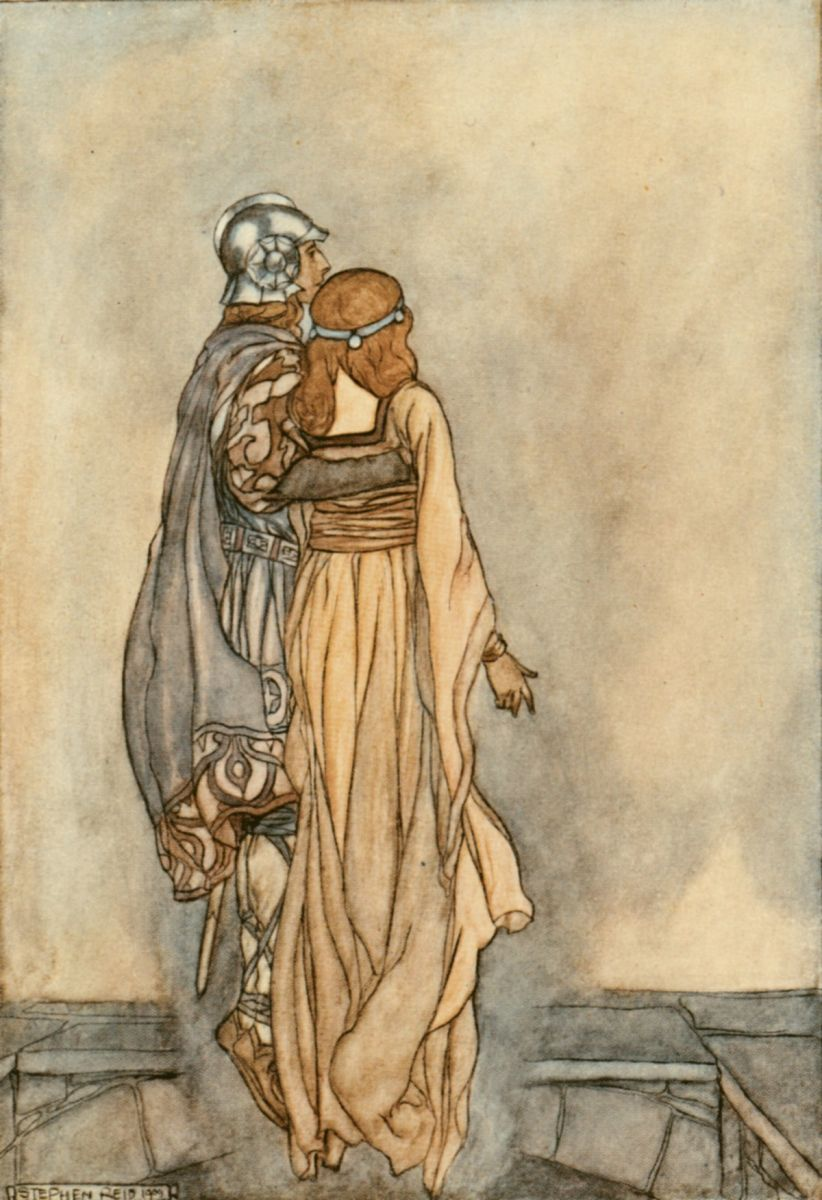
Étaín and Midir, illustration by Stephen Reid in T. W. Rolleston's The High Deeds of Finn (1910)

Tochmarc Étaíne, meaning "The Wooing of Étaín/Éadaoin", is an early text of the Irish Mythological Cycle, and also features characters from the Ulster Cycle and the Cycles of the Kings. It is partially preserved in the manuscript known as the Lebor na hUidre (c. 1106), and completely preserved in the Yellow Book of Lecan (c. 1401), written in language believed to date to the 8th or 9th century. It tells of the lives and loves of Étaín, a beautiful mortal woman of the Ulaid, and her involvement with Aengus and Midir of the Tuatha Dé Danann. It is frequently cited as a possible source text for the Middle English Sir Orfeo. Harvard professor Jeffrey Gantz describes the text as displaying the "poetic sense of law" in Irish legal society.

== The story ==
Although the manuscript evidence is not entirely clear on this, the editors Best and Bergin have divided Tochmarc Étaíne (TE) into three subtales, TE I (§§ 10), TE II (§§ 11-14) and TE III (§§ 14-26).

=== TE I ===
1. The story begins with the conception of Aengus by the Dagda and Boand, wife of Elcmar. Aengus is fostered by Midir, and when he grows up takes possession of Brug na Boinne from Elcmar.
2. Midir visits Aengus, but is blinded by a sprig of holly thrown by boys playing the Brug, and after he has been healed by the physician Dian Cecht, he demands compensation from Aengus: among other things, the hand of the most beautiful woman in Ireland. He has already identified this woman: Étaín, daughter of Ailill, king of the Ulaid. To win her for Midir, Aengus has to perform various tasks for Ailill, including clearing plains and diverting rivers, as well pay her weight in gold and silver. Midir takes Étaín as his wife.
3. However, Midir's first wife, Fúamnach, out of jealousy, turns her into a pool of water, out of which, as it evaporates, emerges a beautiful purple fly. Midir knows the fly is Étaín, and she accompanies him wherever he goes. But Fúamnach conjures up a storm which blows the fly away, and she drifts for seven years before landing on Aengus's clothing, exhausted. Aengus makes her a crystal bower which he carries around with him, until she returns to health. Fuamnach conjures up another storm and blows her away from Aengus, and after another seven years she lands in a golden cup in the hand of the wife of Étar, a warrior of the Ulaid, in the time of Conchobar mac Nessa. Étar's wife drinks from the cup, swallows the fly, and becomes pregnant. Étaín is reborn, 1,012 years after her first birth. Meanwhile, Aengus hunts down Fúamnach and cuts off her head.

=== TE II ===
The High King of Ireland, Eochu Airem, seeks a wife, because the provincial kings will not submit to a king with no queen. He sends messengers to find the most beautiful woman in Ireland, and they find Étaín. He falls in love with her and marries her, but his brother Ailill also falls for her, and wastes away with unrequited love. Eochu leaves Tara on a tour of Ireland, leaving Étaín with the dying Ailill, who tells her the cause of his sickness, which he says would be cured if she gave the word. She tells him she wants him to be well, and he begins to get better, but says the cure will only be complete if she agrees to meet him on the hill above the house, so as not to shame the king in his own house. She agrees to do so three times, but each time she goes to meet him, she in fact meets Midir, who has put Ailill to sleep and taken his appearance. On the third occasion Midir reveals his identity and tells Étaín who he really is, but she does not know him. She finally agrees to go with him, but only if Eochu agrees to let her go.

=== TE III ===
Later, after Ailill has fully recovered and Eochu has returned home, Midir comes to Tara and challenges Eochu to play fidchell, an ancient Irish board game, with him. They play for ever increasing stakes. Eochu keeps winning, and Midir has to pay up. One such game compels Midir to build a causeway across the bog of Móin Lámrige: the Corlea Trackway, a wooden causeway built across a bog in County Longford, dated by dendrochronology to 148 BC, is a real-life counterpart to this legendary road. Finally, Midir suggests they play for a kiss and an embrace from Étaín, and this time he wins. Eochu tells Midir to come back in a year for his winnings, and gathers his best warriors at Tara to prepare for his return. Despite the heavy guard, Midir appears inside the house. Eochu agrees that Midir may embrace Étaín, but when he does, the pair fly away through the skylight, turning into swans as they do so.

Eochu instructs his men to dig up every síd (fairy-mound) in Ireland until his wife is returned to him. Finally, when they set to digging at Midir's síd at Brí Léith, Midir appears and promises to give Étaín back. But at the appointed time, Midir brings fifty women, who all look alike, and tells Eochu to pick which one is Étaín. He chooses the woman he thinks is his wife, takes her home and sleeps with her. She becomes pregnant and bears him a daughter. Later, Midir appears and tells him that Étaín had been pregnant when he took her, and the woman Eochu had chosen was his own daughter, who had been born in Midir's síd. Out of shame, Eochu orders the daughter of their incestuous union to be exposed, but she is found and brought up by a herdsman and his wife, and later marries Eochu's successor Eterscél and becomes the mother of the High King Conaire Mór (in Togail Bruidne Dá Derga she is named as Mess Búachalla and is the daughter of Étaín and Eochu Feidlech). The story ends with Eochu's death at the hands of Sigmall Cael, Midir's grandson.

== Influence ==
The chivalric romance Sir Orfeo, retelling the story of Orpheus as a king rescuing his wife from the fairy king, shows so many motifs in common with this tale that it appears to have been a major influence on Sir Orfeo.

== Manuscript sources ==
- H 2.16 or Yellow Book of Lecan (YBL), col. 876–877 (= facs. p 175a-b) (Dublin, Trinity College Library). Middle part.
- G 4 ((Dublin, National Library of Ireland). Vellum fragment formerly belonging to the main part of the Yellow Book of Lecan) col. 985-97.
- Egerton MS 1782, fo. 106r-108v (London, British Library). Middle part as incorporated into Togail Bruidne Da Derga
- 23 E 25 or Lebor na hUidre (LU), 10636-10707; 10790-10915 (Dublin, Royal Irish Academy).
- H 3.18, p. 605–606 (Dublin, Trinity College Library). Glossed extracts.

== Editions and translations ==
- Müller, Edward (ed. and tr.). "Two Irish Tales. 2. The History of Aillel and Etain." Revue Celtique 3 (1878): 351–60 [Egerton 1782].
- Windisch, Ernst (ed.). "Tochmarc Étáine: 'Das Freien um Etain'." In Irische Texte mit Übersetzungen und Wörterbuch 1 (1891). 113-133. Egerton and LU versions.
- Stern, Ludwig Christian (ed. and tr.). "Das Märchen von Étáin." Zeitschrift für celtische Philologie 5 (1905): 523-36. LU and glossed extracts from H 3.18.
- Bergin, Osborn and R.I. Best (eds.). "Tochmarc Étaíne." Ériu 12 (1934–38): 137-96. Based on G4 and YBL.
- Thurneysen, Rudolf (tr.). "Etain und Ailill Anguba." In Sagen aus dem alten Irland, ed. R. Thurneysen. Berlin, 1901. 77ff. Based on recension II from YBL and LU.
- Leahy, Arthur Herbert (ed. and tr.). "Courtship of Etain." In Heroic Romances of Ireland 2 vols. London, 1905-06. Vol 1: 1-32 (introduction and translation from LU and Egerton), vol 2: 143–61 (edition and translation from conclusion of LU).
- Dillon, Myles. "Tochmarc Étaíne." In Irish Sagas. Dublin, 1959. 11-23. Based on a combination of sources.
- Guyonvarc'h, Christian J. (tr.). "La Courtise d'Étaín." Celticum 15 (1966): 283-327. (French)
- Gantz, Jeffrey (tr.). "The Wooing of Étaíne." In Early Irish myths and sagas. London, 1981. 39-59. Based on a combination of sources.
- Tigges, Wim (ed.), Tochmarc Étaíne: An Old Irish Narrative. Leiden/The Hague, 2015. Based on Bergin and Best. Contains introduction, full text (standardized), commentary and glossary.
