= Conaire Mór =

Legendary High King of Ireland

- High King of Ireland
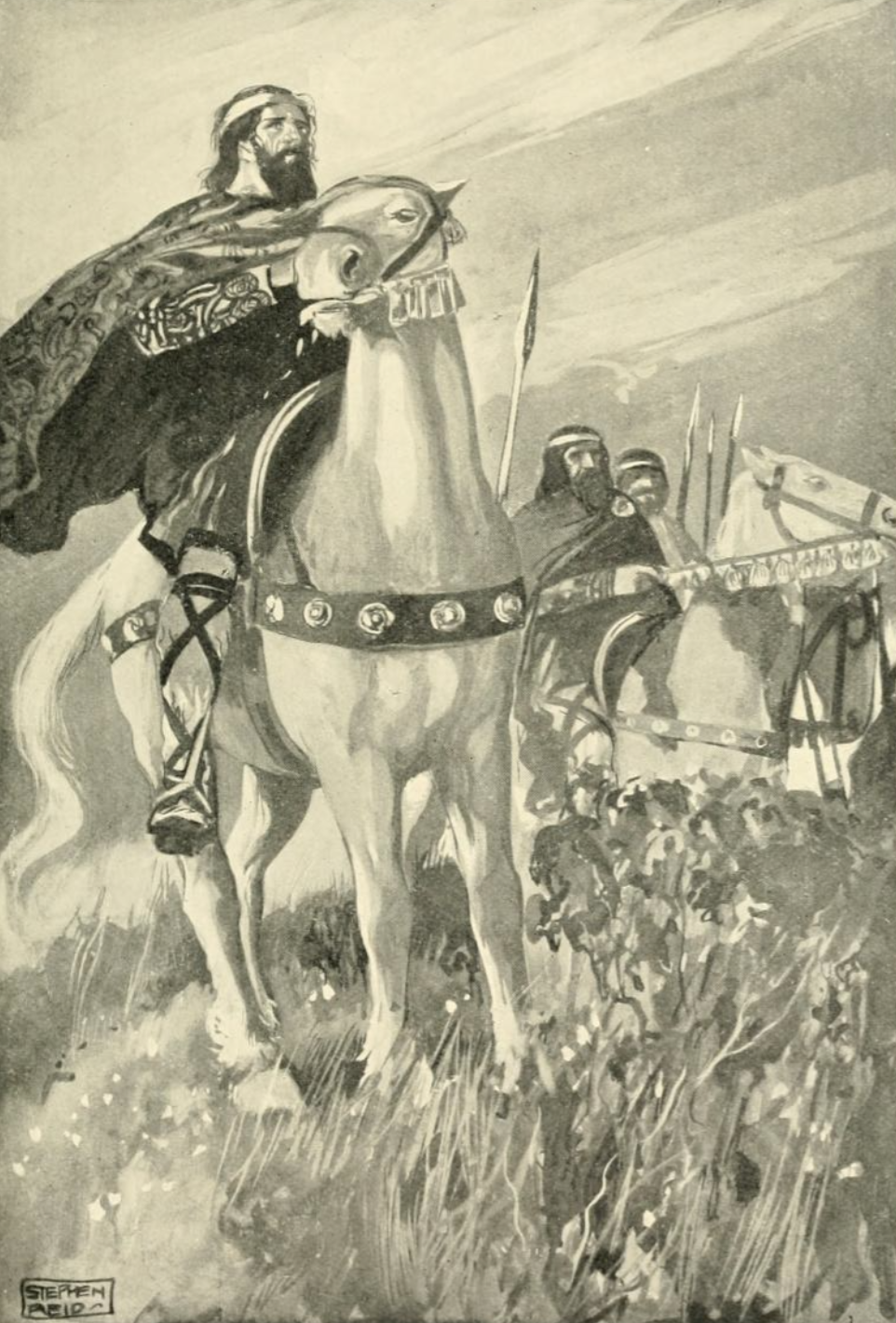
- Conary in the Toils of the Fairy Folk by Stephen Reid
- Reign: 63–33 BC (Foras Feasa ar Éirinn)
- Predecessor: Nuadu Necht
- Successor: Lugaid Riab nDerg
- House: Clanna Dedad

Conaire Mór (the great), son of Eterscél, was, according to medieval Irish legend and historical tradition, a High King of Ireland sometime during the 1st century BC or 1st century AD. His mother was Mess Búachalla, who was either the daughter of Eochu Feidlech and Étaín, or of Eochu Airem and his daughter by Étaín. In the Old Irish saga Togail Bruidne Dá Derga he is conceived when his mother is visited by Nemglan who flies in her skylight in the form of a bird, and is brought up as Eterscél's son.

According to the Lebor Gabála Érenn, he took power after killing his predecessor, and his father's killer, Nuadu Necht. In Togail Bruidne Dá Derga he succeeds Eterscél directly. When Eterscél dies, a bull-feast is held. A bull is killed, a man eats his fill of its meat and drinks its broth, and sleeps as incantations are chanted over him. Whoever this man sees in his sleep will be the new king. He sees a naked man coming along the road to Tara with a stone in his sling. The young Conaire, meanwhile, is hunting birds in his chariot. He chases them into the sea, where they become armed men, announce themselves as Conaire's father's bird troop, and inform him that it is forbidden for him to hunt birds. The leader of the bird troop is called Nemglan and he tells Conaire to go naked to Tara, where he will be made king, and places several geasa (taboos) on his reign. Among other things, he may not be preceded by three red men into the house of a red man. As he approaches Tara he is met by three kings carrying clothes for him, and when he arrives he is made king.

His reign is long and mostly peaceful. His end is told in the Old Irish epic Togail Bruidne Dá Derga, "The Destruction of Da Derga's Hostel", in which events conspire to make him break his geasa one by one. After he has already broken several of them, he travels south along the coast of Ireland, he is advised to stay the night at Da Derga's Hostel, but as he approaches it, he sees three men dressed in red riding red horses arriving before him. "Da Derga" means "Red God". He realises that three red men have preceded him into the house of a red man, and another of his geasa has been broken. His three foster-brothers, the three sons of Dond Désa, whom Conaire had exiled to Alba (Britain) for their crimes, had made alliance with the king of the Britons, Ingcél Cáech, and they were marauding across Ireland with a large band of followers. They attack Da Derga's Hostel. Three times they attempt to burn it down, and three times the fire is put out. Conaire, protected by his champion Mac Cécht and the Ulster hero Conall Cernach, kills six hundred before he reaches his weapons, a further six hundred with his weapons. He asks for a drink, but all the water has been used to put out the fires. Mac Cécht travels across Ireland with Conaire's cup, but none of the rivers will give him water. He returns with a cup of water just in time to see two men cutting Conaire's head off. He kills both of them. Conaire's severed head drinks the water and recites a poem praising Mac Cécht. The battle rages for three more days. Mac Cécht is killed, but Conall Cernach escapes.

He had ruled for thirty or seventy years, depending on the source consulted. The Lebor Gabála Érenn synchronises his reign with that of the Roman emperor Augustus (27 BC – AD 14), and after the birth of Christ, and makes him contemporary with legendary provincial kings Conchobar mac Nessa, Cairbre Nia Fer and Ailill mac Máta. The chronology of Geoffrey Keating's Foras Feasa ar Éirinn dates his reign to 63–33 BC, that of the Annals of the Four Masters to 110–40 BC.

A descendant of Íar mac Dedad, Conaire belonged to the legendary Clanna Dedad, the legendary royal family of the Érainn. His descendants in Ireland and Scotland were known as the Síl Conairi. The last Gaelic king of Scotland from the line from Conaire Mór was Alexander III of Scotland.

Royal titles
Preceded by Nuadu Necht	High King of Ireland; LGE 1st century AD; FFE 63–33 BC; AFM 110–40 BC	Succeeded by Lugaid Riab nDerg
