= Foras Feasa ar Éirinn =

1634 narrative by Geoffrey Keating

Foras Feasa ar Éirinn – literally 'Foundation of Knowledge on Ireland', but most often known in English as 'The History of Ireland' – is a narrative history of Ireland by Geoffrey Keating, written in Irish and completed c. 1634.

== Outline ==
It begins with a preface in which Keating defends the honour of Ireland against the denigrations of writers such as Giraldus Cambrensis, followed by a narrative history in two parts: part one, from the creation of the world to the arrival of Christianity in the 5th century, and part two, from the 5th century to the coming of the Normans during the 12th century.

It depicts Ireland as an autonomous, unitary kingdom of great antiquity. The early part of the work is largely mythical, depicting the history of Ireland as a succession of invasions and settlements, and derives primarily from medieval writings such as the Lebor Gabála Érenn, the Dindsenchas, royal genealogies and stories of heroic kings. The later part depicts the Normans as the latest of this series of settlers. Keating, a Catholic priest of Hiberno-Norman ancestry, gave Irish people of both Gaelic and Norman ancestry credit for the development of the nation, and emphasised the role of the Church as a unifying factor in Irish culture.

The work was extremely popular, surviving in a large number of manuscripts, and its prose style became the standard followed by generations of Irish-language writers. It has been said that it had "an influence on Irish language and literature as significant as Shakespeare's role in relation to English" .

However, it was received critically from the start by some with Sir Richard Cox (1650–1733), a Protestant lawyer of English descent, describing it in the 1680s as "an ill-digested heap of very silly fictions". Modern scholars consider in the context of the antiquarian tendency of Renaissance humanism, with Keating expounding on ancient Irish sources, whose authority he defends, to provide "an origin-legend for Counter-Reformation Catholic Ireland."

== See also ==
- Annals of the Four Masters
- Leabhar na nGenealach
- Ó Cléirigh Book of Genealogies

== Editions and translation ==
- For a fuller list of translations and editions, see: "The History of Ireland", Corpus of Electronic Texts (CELT)
- Keating, Geoffrey (1723), O'Connor, Dermod (ed.), The General History of Ireland ..
- Keating, Geoffrey (1857), O'Mahony, John (ed.), The History of Ireland .., New York, P. M. Haverty
- Keating, Geoffrey (1857) [?], The History of Ireland by Geoffrey Keating DD (in Irish and English)
  - Comyn, David, ed. (1902), "1. The Introduction and the First Book of the History", Irish Texts Society, vol. 4
  - Comyn, David, ed. (1908), "2. The First Book of the History from Sect. XV to the end", Irish Texts Society, vol. 8
  - Dinneen, Patrick S., ed. (1908), "3. The Second Book of the History", Irish Texts Society, vol. 9
  - Dinneen, Patrick S., ed. (1914), "4. The Genealogies and Synchronisms with an Index", Irish Texts Society, vol. 15

=== Manuscripts ===
- "Foras Feasa ar Éirinn (UCD Franciscan MS A14)", Irish Script On Screen (ISOS) (in Irish)
