= Togail Bruidne Dá Derga =

Irish tale belonging to the Ulster Cycle of Irish mythology

- "The Destruction of Dá Derga's Hostel"
- Also known as: Orgain Bruidne Uí Dergae ("The Massacre of Ua Derga's Hostel") (first recension)
- Language: Old Irish and Middle Irish
- Manuscript(s): Three recensions: Recension I: RIA MS 23 N 10; BL MS Egerton 88; NLI MS G 7; TCD MS H 3.18; Lebor na hUidre; Recension II: Yellow Book of Lecan; RIA MS D IV 2; Lebor na hUidre; BL Additional 33993; BL MS Egerton 1782; BL MS Egerton 92; Book of Fermoy; TCD MS H 2.17; TCD MS H 3.18 Recension III: BL MS Egerton 1782; TCD MS H.1.14.
- Genre: prose narrative of the Ulster Cycle and Cycle of the Kings
- Personages: protagonists: Conaire Mór son of Eterscél, Da Derga, Mac Cécht, Conall Cernach, Ingcél Cáech, sons of Dond Désa; Lé Fer Flaith, son of Conaire; etc.

Togail Bruidne Dá Derga (The Destruction of Da Derga's Hostel) is an Irish tale belonging to the Ulster Cycle of Irish mythology. It survives in three Old and Middle Irish recensions, it is part of the Book of Dun Cow. It recounts the birth, life, and death of Conaire Mór son of Eterscél Mór, a legendary High King of Ireland, who is killed at Da Derga's hostel by his enemies when he breaks his geasa. It is considered one of the finest Irish sagas of the early period, comparable to the better-known Táin Bó Cúailnge.

The theme of gathering doom, as the king is forced through circumstances to break one after another of his taboos, is non-Christian in essence, and no Christian interpretations are laid upon the marvels that it relates. In its repetitions and verbal formulas the poem retains the qualities of oral transmission. The tone of the work has been compared with Greek tragedy.

== Summary ==
After Conaire Mór has already broken several of his taboos, he travels south along the coast of Ireland. He is advised to stay the night at Da Derga's Hostel, but as he approaches it, he sees three men dressed in red and riding red horses arriving before him. He realises that three red men have preceded him into the house of a red man (as Dá Derga means "Red God"), and another of his geasa has been broken. His three foster-brothers, the three sons of Dond Désa, whom Conaire had exiled to Alba (Britain) for their crimes, had made alliance with the king of the Britons, Ingcél Cáech, and they were marauding across Ireland with a large band of followers. They attack Da Derga's Hostel. Three times they attempt to burn it down, and three times the fire is put out. Conaire, protected by his champion Mac Cécht and the Ulster hero Conall Cernach, kills six hundred before he reaches his weapons, and a further six hundred with his weapons. He asks for a drink as he is cursed with a magical thirst, but all the water has been used to put out the fires. Mac Cécht travels across Ireland with Conaire's cup, but none of the rivers will give him water. He returns with a cup of water just in time to see two men cutting Conaire's head off. He kills both of them. Conaire's severed head drinks the water and recites a poem praising Mac Cécht. The battle rages for three more days. Mac Cécht is killed, but Conall Cernach escapes.

== Manuscript tradition ==
The tale exists in three recensions:

=== Recension I ===
Recension I is the earliest version of the saga, which briefly summarises the main events of the narrative. It is alternatively known as Orgain Bruidne Uí Dergae (The Massacre of Ua Derga's Hostel), the title given in Lebor na hUidre, to keep it distinct from the later recensions.

- 23 N 10 (RIA): p 72.
- Egerton 88: f 13rb (BL)
- G 7: col. 5 (NLI)
- H 3.18: XVIII, p 556a-556b col. 2 (TCD)
- 23 E 25 or Lebor na hUidre (LU): p 99a (f 98b-99a). Later version.

=== Recension II ===
Recension II, a composite text, is the most famous version of the tale. On the basis of a number of contradictions, inconsistencies and duplicates in the tale, scholars such as Heinrich Zimmer, Max Nettlau and Rudolf Thurneysen suggested, each in his own way, that the recension represents a conflation of two, possibly three, variant sources. However, Máire West has pointed out the weaknesses inherent to their approach and instead favours the more flexible view that the author drew from a greater variety of written and oral sources.

- H 2.16 or Yellow Book of Lecan (YBL): III, col. 716–739 (facs.: p 91a^{1}-104a^{17}). Complete.
- H 2.16 or Yellow Book of Lecan (YBL): p 432–3. Fragment.
- RIA MS D IV 2: f 79ra 1 – 92ra 40. Complete.
- 23 E 25 or Lebor na hUidre (LU): p 83ra-99ra (+H). Beginning missing
- Additional 33993: I, f 4r-5v – or f 2b-5b (?) -(BL). Beginning only.
- Egerton 1782: f 108vb-123vb. Composite text.
- Egerton 92: f 18ra-23v. Fragment = Fermoy.
- 23 E 29 or Book of Fermoy: II, p 213a-216b. Fragment.
- H 2.17: p 477a-482b (TCD). Three fragments.
- H 3.18: XVII, p 528–533. Glossed extracts.

=== Recension III ===
The youngest and longest version is represented by Recension III, to which further materials have been added, including a king-list, a version of Tochmarc Étaine and further dindsenchas lore.

- Egerton 1782, f 106r-123vb (ends in hiatus) (BL)
- H.1.14, f 24-52b (TCD). Copy of previous text.

The translation by J. Gantz, in Early Irish Myths and Sagas (1986) has an introduction that discusses its probable relationship to a king's ritual death, more fully explored by John Grigsby, Beowulf and Grendel 2005:150-52.

== Influence ==
A related tale is De Sil Chonairi Móir.

It has been argued that Geoffrey Chaucer's The House of Fame borrows features from the Togail Bruidne Da Derga. A version of the saga appears in the second half of Sons of the Swordmaker, a 1938 novel by Irish author Maurice Walsh.

== See also ==
- Kingship of Tara

== Primary sources ==
=== Recension I ===
- Nettlau, Max (ed.). "On the Irish text Togail Bruidne dá Derga and connected stories [part 4]." Revue Celtique 14 (1893): 151–2 [H 3.18].
- Stokes, Whitley (ed.). "The Destruction of Dá Derga's Hostel." Revue Celtique 22 (1901): 401–3 [LU]. See below for further details on Stokes' edition.
- Best, R.I. and O. Bergin (eds.). Lebor na hUidre. Book of the Dun Cow. Dublin, 1929. Diplomatic edition of LU.
- Mac Mathúna, S. (ed. and tr.). Immram Brain, Bran's Journey to the Land of the Women. Tübingen, 1985. 449–50. Based on H.3.18, 23 N 10 and Egerton 88, with variants from LU.
- Hull, Vernam (ed.). "Togail Bruidne Da Derga. The Cín Dromma Snechta Recension." Zeitschrift für celtische Philologie 24 (1954): 131–2. Based on G 7.
- Thurneysen, Rudolf (ed.). Zu irischen Handschriften und Literaturdenkmälern. Berlin, 1912, pp. 27–8. Based on 23 N 10 and Eg 88 (at the time, Thurneysen was unaware of the existence of the text in G 7). On date of the text, see p. 30 and Thurneysen, Heldensage 15–8.

=== Recension II ===
- Knott, Eleanor (ed.). Togail Bruidne Da Derga. Dublin, 1936. YBL and variants from D IV 2. Edition available from CELT.
- Stokes, Whitley (ed. and tr.). "The Destruction of Dá Derga's Hostel." Revue Celtique 22 (1901): 9–61, 165–215, 282–329, 390–437; 23 (1902): 88. LU, supplemented by YBL and variants. Translation available in HTML from CELT and Online Medieval Source Book.
- Stokes, Whitley (ed.). The Destruction of Dá Derga's Hostel. Paris, 1902. Reprint of publication in Revue Celtique 22 and 23.
- Best, R.I. and O. Bergin (eds.). Lebor na hUidre. Book of the Dun Cow. Dublin, 1929. Diplomatic edition of LU.
- Draak, Maartje and Frida de Jong (trs.). "De verwoesting van Da Derga's Hal." In Van helden, elfen en dichters. De oudste verhalen uit Ierland. Amsterdam, 1979. 148–201. Dutch translation.

== Secondary literature ==
- Byrne, Francis John, Irish Kings and High-Kings. Batsford, London, 1973. ISBN 0-7134-5882-8
- Carney, James Patrick, "Language and Literature to 1169" in Dáibhí Ó Cróinín (ed.), A New History of Ireland, volume 1: Prehistoric and Early Ireland. Oxford University Press, Oxford, 2005. ISBN 0-19-821737-4
- Thomas Charles-Edwards. "Geis, Prophecy, Omen, and Oath", in Celtica 23: Essays in honour of James Patrick Carney (1999): 38–59. PDF
- Gantz, J. Early Irish Myths and Sagas (Harmondsworth: Penguin) 1986
- McTurk, Rory W., Chaucer and the Norse and Celtic Worlds. Ashgate, Aldershot, 2005. ISBN 0-7546-0391-1
- West, Máire. "The genesis of Togail Bruidne da Derga: a reappraisal of the 'two-source' theory." Celtica 23 (Essays in honour of James Patrick Carney) (1999): 413–35. ISBN 1-85500-190-X. Available as PDF from DIAS.
- West, Máire. "Leabhar na hUidhre's Position in the Manuscript History of Togail Bruidne Da Derga and Orgain Brudne Uí Dergae." Cambridge Medieval Celtic Studies 20 (Winter 1990): 61–98.
- O'Connor, Ralph. The Destruction of Da Derga's Hostel: Kingship and Narrative Artistry in a Mediaeval Irish Saga. Oxford University Press: Oxford, 2013. ISBN 9780199666133
