= Ecne =

God of wisdom in Celtic mythology

In Celtic mythology, Ecne (Wisdom, Old Irish ecna, ecne, wise, enlightened) was one of the Tuatha Dé Danann and was the god or goddess of wisdom.

Ecne is generally presumed to be the grandson of the goddess Ana/Anu who conceived Ecne after being impregnated by her three sons.

Ana's three sons may have been Brian, Iuchar, and Iucharba, who were sons of Tuireann, aka Delbáeth. Thus Ecne's three fathers were perhaps these brothers Brian, Iuchar, and Iucharba (of Oidheadh Chlainne Tuireann). Since the brothers were sired by Tuireann/Delbáeth upon his own daughter Danand, the brothers too were born out of an incestual relationship. (Note: Macalister (1941) Lebor Gabála 4 Section VII. §316, pp. 128–129 "Donand ingen don Delbaeth chetna, .i. mathair in trir dēdenaig, .i. Briain ⁊ Iucharba ⁊ Iuchair. Ba siat sin na tri Dee Dana, diatá Sliab na Tri nDee. 0cus is don Delbaeth sin ba hainm Tuirell Bicreo." (English translation excerpted by maryjones.).) (Note: Thus "their mother being their father's daughter", Brian and his brothers are given "sublimated divinity" in the Lebor Gabála inconsistent with the Oidheadh Cloinne Tuireann. Macalister (1941), endnote to §316, p. 300. Cf. also Introduction, p. 103.) The brothers are called the tri dee Donand, meaning the three gods of Danu, (Note: Cf. endnote, p. 300 that the undoubtedly sacred mountain of the three gods (Sliab na Tri nDee) remains unidentified.) which can also be read as the three gods of dán, or knowledge. Related attributes are personified as their descendants, and Wisdom is the daughter of all three.

Ecne's three fathers killed Cian, the father of Lugh, and Lugh's deadly revenge is recounted in Oidheadh Chlainne Tuireann ("The Fate of the Children of Tuireann').

In Irish Druids and Old Irish Religions, James Bonwick reports Ecne as female and as the goddess of poetry.
