= Mythological Cycle =

Conventional division in Irish mythology

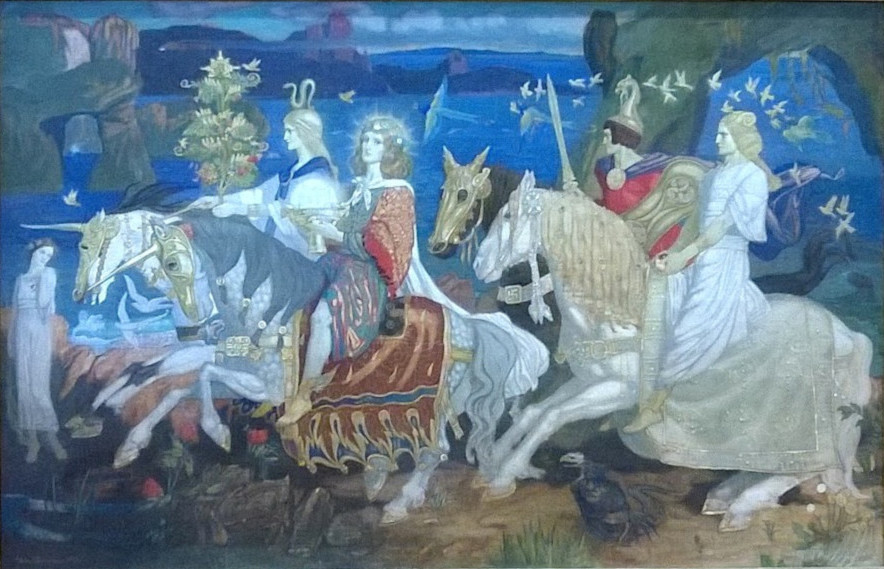
The Tuatha Dé Danann in John Duncan's "Riders of the Sidhe" (1911)

The Mythological Cycle is a conventional grouping within Irish mythology. It consists of tales and poems about the god-like Tuatha Dé Danann, who are based on Ireland's pagan deities, and other mythical races such as the Fomorians and the Fir Bolg. It is one of the four main story 'cycles' of early Irish myth and legend, along with the Ulster Cycle, the Fianna Cycle and the Cycles of the Kings. The name "Mythological Cycle" seems to have gained currency with Arbois de Jubainville c. 1881–1883. (Note: The Irish form Irish: na Scéalta Miotaseolaíochta given on "téarma.ie". has rarely if ever been used in any publication.) James MacKillop says the term is now "somewhat awkward", (Note: Mackillop 1998, mythological cycle "Somewhat awkward today, the phrase 'Mythological Cycle' was coined to describe those early stories that, in the absence of a Celtic cosmology, deal most with origins and the discernible remnants of pre-Christian religion; its first usage pre-dates the currency of 'Celtic Mythology'".) and John T. Koch notes it is "potentially misleading, in that the narratives in question represent only a small part of extant Irish mythology". He prefers T Ó Cathasaigh's name, Cycle of the Gods. Important works in the cycle are the Lebor Gabála Érenn ("Book of Invasions"), the Cath Maige Tuired ("Battle of Moytura"), the Aided Chlainne Lir ("Children of Lir") and Tochmarc Étaíne ("The Wooing of Étaín").

== Overview ==
The characters appearing in the cycle are essentially gods from the pre-Christian pagan past in Ireland. Commentators exercising caution, however, qualify them as representing only "godlike" beings, and not gods. This is because the Christian scribes who composed the writings were generally (though not always) careful not to refer to the Tuatha Dé Danann and other beings explicitly as deities. The disguises are thinly veiled nonetheless, and these writings contain discernible vestiges of early Irish polytheistic cosmology.

Examples of works from the cycle include numerous prose tales, verse texts, as well as pseudo-historical chronicles (primarily the Lebor Gabála Érenn (LGE), commonly called The Book of Invasions) found in medieval vellum manuscripts or later copies. Some of the romances are of later composition and found only in paper manuscripts dating to near-modern times (Cath Maige Tuired and The Fate of the Children of Tuireann).

Near-modern histories such as the Annals of the Four Masters and Geoffrey Keating's History of Ireland (=Seathrún Céitinn, Foras Feasa ar Éirinn) are also sometimes considered viable sources, since they may offer additional insights with their annotated and interpolated reworkings of Lebor Gabála Érenn accounts.

Orally transmitted folk-tales may also be, in a broad sense, considered mythological cycle material, notably, the folk-tales that describe Cian's tryst with Balor's daughter while attempting to recover the bountiful cow Glas Gaibhnenn.

The god-folk of the successive invasions are "euhemerised", i.e., described as having dwelt terrestrially and ruling over Ireland in kingship before the age of mortal men (the Milesians, or their descendants). (Note: "The Tuatha De Danann, also, after having been with visible body, sole masters of the earth, assume in a later age invisibility, and share with men folk the dominion of the world".) Afterwards, the Tuatha Dé Danann are said to have retreated into the sídhe (fairy mounds), cloaking their presence by raising the féth fiada (fairy mist). (Note: Mackillop 1998, féth fiada, the story of the assigning by Mananán of the sidhe to individual TDD is found in the tale Altrom Tighe Dá Medar. But cf. De Gabáil in t-Sída [The Taking of the Fairy Mound (cited below). The Lebor Gabála Érenn explains away the magic fog as smoke from the ships the TDD burnt upon arrival.) Having disappeared but not died, the deities oftentimes make "guest appearances" in narratives categorised under other cycles. (e.g., Lugh's appearance as the divine father and Morrígan as nemesis to the Ulster hero Cuchulainn; (Note: Lugh appears in the Compert Con Cúlainn, the Great Queen in the Táin Bó Cúailnge proper and possibly, under a different moniker, in the Táin Bó Regamna.) encounters of Finnian characters with dwellers of the sidhe; Cormac mac Airt's, or his grandfather's visits to the otherworldly realms.)

Collected literature, while they do not belong to the cycle in entirety, nevertheless capture tidbits of lore about the deities.

== Lists of literature ==
The following table is a summary of titles of all of the mythological texts that survive and are in print.

Mythological texts
Irish title	English title	Remarks & Notes	Sources
Lebor Gabala Erenn	The Book of the Taking of Ireland	Introduction Redaction I Redaction II Redaction III Miniugad O'Cleric's Recension	
Cath Maige Tured Conga	The First Battle of Mag Tured		
Do Cath Mhuighe Tuireadh Ann So	The Second Battle of Mag Tured	Version A	
Do Cath Mhuighe Tuireadh Ann So	The Second Battle of Mag Tured	Version B	
Aided chloinne Tuireann	The Fate of the Children of Tuireann		
Aided Chloinne Lir	The Fate of the Children of Lir		
	The Fate of Sinann		
Scel Tuain maic Cairill do Finnan Maige Bile inso sis	Tuan mac Cairill's Story to Finnen of Moville here below		
	The Colloquy between Fintan and the Hawk of Achill		
	The Voyage of Bran		
	The Tale of Etain	The Wooing of Etain (version A) The Wooing of Etain (version B) The Wooing of Etain (version C) The Wooing of Etain (version D) The Nourishment of the House of the Two Pails	
	The Taking of the Sid		
	The Dream of Oengus		
	The Tale of Mongan	The Birth of Mongan A Story from which it is inferred that Mongan was Finn Mac Cumaill A Story of Mongan The Cause of Mongan's Frenzy The Conception of Mongan and Dub-Lacha's Love for Mongan Why Mongan was Deprived of Noble Issue	
	The Settling of the Manor of Tara		
	Fingen's Night Watch		

== History of the Mythological Cycle ==
The main source of mythology comes from The Book of Invasions, or Lebor Gabala Erenn. It is an abridged compilation of both prose and poetry on the origins of Ireland and the extraordinary deities. The original was more expansive, but perished in what is to be assumed Viking raids, or being claimed during war time.

A supplemental text is attributed to a chronicler that goes by the name Keating, who published his book in the 17th century. He had access to materials that have not yet been published. Nennius and Eochaid Ua Flainn, chroniclers who lived during the 10th century, recorded mythological Irish history by way of poetry. Though their contributions are short and semi-vague, they contain a lot of precious information on Ireland's spiritual beliefs of the time. The Tuatha De Danann can be linked to the same origins as the gods in Greek mythology. Hesiod calls the Greek Gods "the Golden Race," and similar attributes are seen in the Celtic gods.

In Irish mythology, Ireland was subject to 6 invasions. The first 5 were from otherworldy beings, and the last was from Milesians.

The Tuatha De Danann were known to come from the heavens, but that may be from scribes not knowing how to execute their origin. So the scribes borrowed from past religions like the Greek, Roman, and Eastern myth to create an origin story. The Gauls were thought to come from underneath the Earth. This information had been passed down from druids from Dispater, the God of the underworld.

Earth was thought to be a woman at the time, so this was thought to be a metaphorical birth, not ascending from hell. The earth, moon, and sun were thought to be created by druids, much like how Brahmans boasted the same cosmogony story. Much like preceding myth, the Gauls believed the trees and mountains held up the sky.

These stories stayed in the oral tradition because the Irish had not been invaded at the time, like surrounding countries. In conjunction, the druidic schools wanted to maintain the stories in verbal form. This kept the stories in circulation to the culture and public. When Christian scribes came to Ireland, they wrote down the stories in Latin. In succeeding centuries many of the texts were lost or destroyed during Viking raids. The remaining texts were re-recorded in manuscripts in the 11th and 12th century. Though previous manuscripts were are dated to 3–4 centuries earlier in the Irish language.

== History of the Tuatha Dé Danann ==
The Tuatha Dé Danann are divine beings that came to Ireland by ships and inhabited the country before the native Irish. They came to Ireland to take the land from the Fir Bolgs that had already been residing in the north of Ireland at the time. The Tuatha were immediately perceived as gods for their superior skills: various arts of druidry, magic, prophecy and history. Their leader was named Nuada. He led them to war against the Fir Bolgs around the west shore of Ireland, where the Tuatha had arrived by ship. Many of the Tuatha died in this war, but thousands of Fir Bolgs died. Including their leader, Eochai Mac Erc. They come from another world, but reside in Ireland until they were pushed out by war with a semi-demonic race called the Fomorians. Their king is known in the mythology as Balor. The Fomorians resided on the outskirts of Ireland. When the Tuatha Dé Danann were defeated in battle against the Milesians, they were forced to live underground in the Sidhes. The Sidhes were chambers under Ireland's surface. Though away from the mortal world, they still would come to surface on special days like Hallowe'en and May Day.

=== Verse texts ===
Besides independent verses, a number of poems are embedded in prose tales, etc. A number of them are also preserved in the pseudohistorical Lebor Gabála Érenn, Keating, etc.

- Arsaidh sin a eóuin Accla ("Fintan and the Hawk of Aicill")
- Coire Érmai / Coire Goriath ("The Cauldron of Poesy")

=== Lore ===
Collected lore are not wholly of mythological content, but parts of it are. "The Fitness of Names" (#149–159, etc.) provides interesting explanations on names of Dian Cecht among others. Irish onomastica, the Dindshenchas, also include stories about deities such as Boann (under Inber Colptha), the Dagda (under Fidh nGaible), Brecan (Coire Brecain), often in developed narrative verse or prose tales. Genealogical tracts and the Roll of the Kings, various glosses (e.g. to the law treatise Senchus Mor) may also be culled for information.

- Banshenchas ("History of Women") Dobbs 1932
- Cóir Anmann ("The Fitness of Names"): Stokes 1897
- Dindsenchas ("Lore of Places")
- Sanas Cormaic ("Cormac's Glossary"): Nes[s] (Nescoit)
- Triads of Ireland: mention of the indeoin Dagdai, ox of Díl, etc.

=== Pseudohistory ===
- Chronicon Scotorum
- Lebor Gabála Érenn

=== Folktales ===
- Glas Gaibhnenn

=== Prose tales ===
The following prose tales are described in greater depth in the following section.

Prose tales and current sources
Irish title	English title	Remarks & Notes	Sources
Aislinge Óenguso	Dream of Aengus	remscél to Táin Bó Cúailnge	
Altram Tige Dá Medar	The Fosterage of the House of Two [Milk-]Vessels	alt. "Tale of Curchóg"	
Cath Muige Tuired Cunga	The [First] Battle of Mag Tuired of Cong		
Cath Maige Tuired	The Second Battle of Mag Tuired		
Ceithri cathracha i r-robadar Tuatha De Danand	Four Jewels of the Tuatha Dé Danann		
De Gabáil in t-Sída	The Taking of the Fairy Mound	remscél to Táin Bó Cúailnge	
Echtra Nera[i]	The Adventures of Nera]	remscél to Táin Bó Cúailnge	
Eachtra Léithín	The Adventures of Léithín	mod. versions	
	How the Dagda Got His Magic Staff (club)		
Oidheadh Chloinne Lir	The Fate of the Children of Lir		
Oidheadh Chloinne Tuirenn	The Fate of the Children of Tuirenn	late romance	
Scél Tuáin meic Chairill	The Story of Tuán son of Cairell		
Tochomlod Nemid co hErin (?)	The Invasion of Nemed	frag.	
Tochomlod mac Miledh a hEspain i nErind	The Progress of the Sons of Mil from Spain to Ireland	(Note: The text published in Dobbs 1937 was noticed by O'Curry, but evidently he felt this was not a full-fledged migration tale, but an excerpted account only (on par with the Lebor Gabála Érenn), and characterized it as merely a source for the Battle of Tailtiu.)	

== Survey of prose tales ==
The euhemerised deities arrived in five sets of migrations (see Lebor Gabála Érenn), but none of the individual migrations tales (Irish: tochomlada; sing. tochomlod) survived intact. (Note: Arbois de Jubainville & Best (1884, 1903) write about he "catalogue of Irish epic literature" in the LL of and other mss., which is a listing of the important tales (primscéla). There is a sub-list under the heading "'Tochomoloda' or Emigration", and "of the thirteen pieces contained in this ... seven are mythological: 1. Tochomold Partholon ..." (p. 4); "Unfortunately, none of the seven pieces ... is now extant" (p. 12), except for the Nemed fragment (see list below). The author dates the compiling of the original catalogue to 700 CE, with later additions to the list around 950 CE.) (Note: See O'Curry 1878, pp. 243 ff for a discussion of the catalogue (ancient lists of story titles), and his Appendix LXXXIX, pp 584–593 for a transcription of the actual catalogue from the Book of Leinster; cf. Tochlomod. Cf. however Hull 1935 and Dobbs 1937.) Remnants of the migration tales are the summarised accounts given in the Lebor Gabála Érenn (Book of Invasions). Apart from these are the tale of Tuan mac Cairill, Fintan mac Bóchra colloquy. Tuan and Fintan are ancient beings from the Antediluvian past, who have reincarnated into different creatures, and are referred to in the Lebor Gabála Érenn as well.

Of the battle tales (Irish: catha; sing. cath), the full narratives of the First and Second Battle of Moytura (Battles of Mag Tuired) survive in relatively late (16th century) manuscripts. (Note: The first battle in a unique manuscript (TCD H 2.17); second battle in Harl. 5280, and a RIA 24 P 9 somewhat later (c. 1650). See Scéla's site.) Other important battle tales such as the Cath Tailten (Battle of Tailten) or Orgain Tuir Chonaind ("Massacre of Conan's Tower") are lost, though abstracted in the Lebor Gabála Érenn.

The late romance of Oidheadh Chloinne Tuireann ("The Fate of the Children of Tuireann") tells how Lugh fines the sons of Tuireann for his father Cian's murder, compelling them to collect a series of magical objects and weapons which will be useful in the second battle of Mag Tuired against the Fomorians. An earlier version of this is recorded in the Lebor Gabála Érenn, with a somewhat different list of fines (eiric), with no indication the murder happened on the eve of the great battle.

In the Oidheadh Chloinne Lir ("The Fate of the Children of Lir"), the eponymous children are turned into swans by their jealous stepmother, and live in swan form into Christian times, when they are converted, transformed back into human form, and die of extreme old age.

Tochmarc Étaíne ("The Wooing of Étaín") tells first of the conception of Aengus through the adultery of the Dagda and Boann, and how Aengus won the residence of the Brú na Bóinne from Boann's husband Elcmar. It goes on to tell of the various lives of Étaín, wife of Midir, who is turned into a fly and driven away by Midir's jealous first wife Fuamnach. In her insect form she becomes the companion of Aengus, until Fuamnach once again drives her away, and she is swallowed by a mortal woman and reborn as her daughter. Her beauty attracts the attention of the High King, Eochaid Airem, who marries her; ultimately her bereft husband Midir uses magic and trickery to win her back.

There is also a curious account regarding Goídel Glas, the legendary ancestor of the migratory races and eponymous creator of the Gaelic language, and how he was cured by Moses's rod from a snake bite, related to in the Lebor Gabála Érenn, although Macalister is dismissive of it as fiction invented by glossators.

== See also ==
- List of High Kings of Ireland
- Metrical Dindshenchas
- Celtic astrology
