= Failinis =

Dog in one cycle of Irish mythology

Failinis [FAW IHN-ish] or Ṡalinnis/Shalinnis (Note: The lenited-s (ṡ or "sh") is pronounced /h/.) is a dog in the Mythological Cycle of Irish literature, belonging to Lugh Lámhfhada of the Tuatha Dé Danann; it was one of the eric (reparation) items exacted from the sons of Tuireann.

It was originally the hound-whelp of the smith or the king of Iruaith (Ioruath, Hiruaidhe, etc.). Later on, Lugh's Failinis (var. Fer Mac) belonged to a foreign threesome from Iruaith that came to Ireland, and encountered by the Fíanna led by Fionn mac Cumhaill in the Fenian cycle.

== Name variants ==
The puppy is referred to as the "whelp of the royal smith of Ioruath" but otherwise unnamed in the 12th century Lebor Gabála Érenn ("Book of Invasions") version of the story of the sorrows of the sons of Tuireann. (Note: Ioruath, a legendary Scandinavian kingdom.)

It is named Failinis in the lengthier, romance version of this story, Fate of the Children of Tuireann (Oidheadh Chloinne Tuireann, abbreviated OCT) (Note: Macalister (1941), pp. 302–303 anticipates O'Rahilly (1946), p. 308 with the OCT abbreviation, but O'Rahilly's spelling (Chloinne) will be preferred over Macalister's spelling in his notes (Oidheadh Cloinne Tuireann).) of much later date, with the earliest manuscript dating to the 17th century. (Note: Although Mackillop dates the earliest to the 16th century with more from the 17th, the resume of manuscripts given by Alan Bruford states that the earliest is a beginning fragmentary portion translated into Latin in the Harleian manuscript 5280, c. 1600, dated to "early 17th century" elsewhere. Otherwise the earliest datable Bruford gives is 1 RIA 23 M 25 dated to 1684.)

Eugene O'Curry hypothesized the name Failinis to be a transposition of "Inis Fáil (Island of Fail)", an ancient name for Ireland; R. A. S. Macalister also stating that the name "sounds like an extra-ordinary mythological mix-up".

However this "mix-up" was far from modern. As Rudolf Thurneysen noted, a virtually identical name for the pup, Failinis (Note: Also transcribed "Fáilinis'" by Scowcroft.) or Ṡalinnis /Shalinnis, (Note: Thurneysen gives "Salinnis" but "Ṡalinnis" is the correct Irish spelling given by Stern (1900), while "Salinnis" is given in the German translation.) occurs in a medieval 11th or early 12th century ballad from the Fenian cycle. (Note: Thus the Ossianic poem is "hardly younger than ICT", the tract in the Lebor Gabála Érenn.)

The dog's name is Fer Mac (var. Fermac) in the prose version of the ballad's story in The Colloquy with the Ancients of the Fenian Cycle. Although names and circumstances differ, the link between the ballad and the Acallam have been made by A. G. van Hamel and Richard M. Scowcroft.

== General description ==
The hound was invincible in battle, caught every wild beast it encountered, and could magically change any running water it bathed in into wine.

It held dominion over all beasts, or hunted all sorts of game including fish. (Note: According to the romance (OCT), "all the wild beasts of the world" would prostrate themselves before Failinis, while Fer Mac was said to provide game when the day's hunt proved empty, killing any animal including salmon and otter.)

The dog's ability to magically produce wine occurs in several sources. The ability to turn water into wine is mentioned in the "Book of Invasions" and the ballad, but not in the OCT. In the ballad, "mead or wine" emanated from the spring water that Failinis bathed in, whereas Fer Mac magically disgorged liquor from its mouth.

Failinis of the ballad was a "hound of the loveliest color", (Note: German: Hund von schönster Farbe) mighty and wonderful, while Fer Mac was described as parti-colored, displaying shades of every color including white, black, and blue.

The hound of ballad was huge by day (able to "overcome fifty men"), but was a "thunderbolt, ball of fire" (Old Irish: caer thened) by night. Similarly, Fer Mac was normally huge, of greater size than any hound, but when dispensing liquor from its mouth it dwindled to the size of a "pine marten on a queen's lap". Fer Mac also vomited quantities of gold and silver as needed.

Its gender is not consistently translated: cú of the ballad has been rendered as a "male dog" (German: Rüde), but Fer Mac is given as either a "bitch" or a "hound".

=== Change of ownership ===
It was one of the prized treasures exacted by Lugh Lámhfhada from the children of Tuireann (Brían, Iuchar and Iucharba) as reparation for the slaying of Lugh's father Cian.

The hound was originally owned either by the royal smith of Iruaid (Note: "Ioruath" (Old Irish: Hiruaidhe.)) or by the King of Iruaid (Note: "Ioruaidhe" (Irish: h-Ioruaiḋe).) in the Mythological Cycle. This Iruaid, variously spelled, is a mythical Scandinavian kingdom. (Note: Stern (1900), p. 10 translates the land (Hiruath) as 'Norway'; Dooley & Roe (1999), note to p. 153 (on p.241) states that besides Norway "Jutish Heorot in Beowulf" has been suggested, although King Hrothgar's mead-hall Heorot is generally held to be in Lejre, Zealand in Denmark rather than Jutland. O'Curry favored identifying Ioruaidhe with Iceland.) The hound was taken by the children of Tuireann (Brian, Iuchar and Iucharba) and delivered over to Lugh Lámhfhada as part of reparations.

The same hound Failinis (Shalinnis) that once belonged to Lugh of the Mantles (Irish: Lugh na lenn) that the sons of Tuireann (meic Turend Bicrend) took from the king of Iruaid (Note: "Hiruath", Irish: hIruaide, Hiruaithe,.) figures in the Fenian cycle, repackaged as a dog owned by a certain threesome from a foreign land. The owners are Sela, Dorait, Domnán in the ballad, and Dub ('Dark'), Ág ('Battle') and Ilar ('Eagle') from "Irúaith in the East", in fact, three princes of Irúaith according to the prose work The Colloquy of the Elders.

=== Strife and demise ===
In both the ballad and prose versions of the Fenian cycle story, the threesome slew the warrior(s) of the Fíanna who spied on them when they were secretly making their wine or heavy drink using their dog. The condemned peepers are Dubán mac Bresail in the ballad, and Donn and Dubán the two sons of the King of Ulster in The Colloquy.

In the ballad, Finn mac Cumhal uses the "tooth of wisdom" (Old Irish: dét fiss) and discovers the threesome (Sela, Dorait, Domnán) to be responsible for Dubán's death, and the threesome forfeit the dog Failinis as compensation. The threesome take a solemn oath never to transport the dog alive out of Ireland, but then they kill the hound and flay its hide (Old Irish: croccend, German: Fell), and carry it off into foreign lands. (Note: The poem mentions the hide being taken to Alba to the northeast sairthúaid as well referring to "tír thair" (eastern land) "of the Britons, Picts, and Albans". So that van Hamel summarizes as "they kill it and take the body with them on their way north", whereas Scowcroft summarizes that "the hide is taken over the eastern sea".)

In The Colloquy, the Fíanna form search parties of nine warriors and nine gillies each but fail to discover the whereabouts of the two Ulidian princes. And the threesome and the dog obtain Finn mac Cumhal's protection, even though some of the Fíanna had entertained designs on eliminating them.

The dog Fer Mac's modes of attack are elaborated upon in The Colloquy. It reacted to the spying Ultonian princes at its masters' bidding, summoning a wind of druidry by lifting its tail, causing the two spies to drop shield, spear and sword. The three warriors of Irúaith then killed the Ulstermen, and the bitch blew its breath on the bodies, turning them into dust and ashes, with neither blood nor flesh nor bone remaining. Later, the threesome and the dog provided mercenary work for the Fíanna, dispatching the three sons of Uár who were becoming a menace. After Dub of Irúaith pronounced a banishing Incantation, the dog raised a magic wind its tail that sent the enemies to sea, and the enemies were forced by the magic spell to fight one another, receiving fatal sword cuts to their heads.

== Attestations ==
=== Book of Invasions ===
In the Lebor Gabala Erenn ("Book of Invasions") version of the sorrows of the children of Tuireann, one of Lugh's demanded reparation is an unnamed pup or whelp that belonged to the royal smith of Ioruath (Irish: Cuilen rīg goband na Hiruaidhe), a legendary Scandinavian kingdom. (Note: group-"lower-alpha")

The textual source(s) here has been dubbed "Imthechta Clainne Tuirill (ICT)" by T. F. O'Rahilly, a designation which includes the Poem LXVI "Etsid in senchas sluagach.." and the later prose summary of it which begins "Imthechta Clainne Tuirill.. " in §319 of Macalister's edition of the LGE.

The poem also sings of the whelp of "Luachra Lia", probably some Scandinavian region (Lochlann), that was a hound by night and sheep by day. Thurneysen was of the opinion that this was a different whelp, but the attributes of these two dogs were melded into one by the prosifier, so that in the prose it was "a hound by night and a sheep by day" and whatever pool of water touched its hide or pelt (Irish: croccenn) turned to wine. (Note: Macalister for some reason neglects to translate the word croccenn in the prose and renders the passage "Every water which is cast upon it becomes wine", but he does translate it in the inserted poem: "wine would be every water.. / which is put upon its skin". Thurneysen's translation of the prose does state that any liquid poured on its skin (German: Haut) turned into wine: "Jede Flüssigkeit die in seine Haut gegossen wird, wird Wein".Thurneysen (1896), p. 247)

=== Oidheadh Chloinne Tuireann ===
The hound's name Failinis appears in the full romance version of The Fate of the Children of Tuireann (Oidheadh Chloinne Tuireann), which only survives in manuscripts from the 17th century and later.

Failinis belonged to the King of Ioruaidhe (Irish: h-Ioruaide) or Hiruath, etc., in this romance version, (Note: Rather than the royal smith who is the hound's owner in the LGE.) and about this hound it was said that "all the wild beasts of the world .. would fall down out of their standing" (i.e., prostrate themselves) and that it was "more splendid than the sun in his fiery wheels".

The plot is more developed in the romance concerning the brothers' acquisition of the hound. After completing the quest for the pigs of Asal, (Note: Asal of the Golden Pillars. O'Curry's text gives "Easal", but the alternate spelling "Asal" is footnoted. "Assal" is used as the primary heading in Mackillop (1998) ed., Oxford Dictionary of Celtic Mythology.) accompany the sons of Tuireann so he can advise his son-in-law, the King of Ioruaidhe to relinquish the hound without a fight. The counsel is refused, and a battle ensues culminating in a single combat between Brian son of Tuireann and the King of Ioruaidhe, the king is defeated and bound, and forfeits the hound for his release.

=== 12th-century ballad ===
The name of Lugh's dog Failinis is recorded in medieval manuscripts in a certain "ballad" (Irish: dúan), nominally titled "Dám Thrír Táncatair Ille ("They came here as a band of three") from its initial line. (Note: Dám Thrír Táncatair Ille ("They came here as a band of three"). Title and English translation given by Štěpán Kosík at SCÉLA site.) It has been characterized by Ludwig Christian Stern as an Ossianic ballad of the 12th century, i.e., a pseudepigraphic poem pretended to be written by Oisín reminiscing on the Fianna's past.

The ballad relates how a threesome from Iruaid ("Hiruath", "Hiruaithe",) brings along a magical dog (Irish: Ṡalinnis /Shalinnis or Failinis) which turns any fresh water (spring water) it touches into mead or wine. The dog once belonged to Lugh of the mantles (Irish: Lugh na Lenn, a corruption of Lugh's matronymic "Lugh mac Ethlenn", as pointed out by Stern.

The threesome is using the dog to turn spring water into wine and drinking it, when one of the Fianna (Dubán mac Bresail) intrudes, so the three kill Dubán. Finn mac Cumhal, by (placing his thumb under) his tooth of wisdom (Old Irish: dét fiss) (Note: Or "knowledge-tooth" according to Scowcroft.) discovers the threesome (Sela, Dorait, Domnán) to be responsible for Dubán's death, and the threesome forfeit the dog Failinis as compensation, swearing by the sun and the moon they would never take it alive out of Ireland, but then they kill the hound and flay it, carrying off the dog's hide its hide (Note: Old Irish: croccend, German: Fell.) across the sea, north-eastwards or eastwards. The Fianna's pursuit ensues, to no avail.

=== The Colloquy of the Elders ===
The stories relating to the three princes of Iorúaithe and their wonder-dog in the Acallam na Senórach (The Colloquy of the Ancients) are closely summarized by A. G. van Hamel. And van Hamel has noted that gaps in the story of the hound in The Colloquy can be filled with the use of the Fenian ballad, as well as noting connections to the hound the LGE tract and romance about the sons of Tuireann. Richard M. Scowcroft also connects the ballad to The Colloquy.

The story of is written in the form of a frame story where Caílte who is a survivor of the Fíanna into the age of Saint Patrick the "Adze-Head" recount various adventures of the Fíanna relating to various place names (onomastics).

Thus the arrival of the three men who are sons of the King of Iorúaith, accompanied by the dog occurs in the story of the Little Fort of the Wonders (Old Irish: Raithin na n-ingnad). The spying by the two princes of Ulster and their killing by the men and hound occurs in the explanation regarding the two landmark graves, and it is within this episode that the hound's name is revealed to be Fer Mac or Fermac. The Fianna deliberate on the fate of the three in the story of the Oakwood of the Conspiracy (Old Irish: Daire in choccair), within which Caílte plays advocate and defend the three men, extolling the virtue of their skills as well as the hound's hunting prowess. And the three and the hound defeating three red-haired sons of Uár (on behalf of the Fíanna) occurs in the story of the Little Fort of the Incantations (Old Irish: Raithin na Sénaigechta).
