= Fragarach =

Sword in Irish mythology

In Irish mythology, Fragarach (or Freagarthach), also known as "The Answerer" or "The Retaliator", was the sword of the sea god Manannán mac Lir. The sword weakened its foes, and no mail or armour could block it.

Nuada, the first high king, lost his arm in the first battle of Mag Tuired and, being mutilated, was no longer suitable to be high king. So, for the second battle of Mag Tuired, Nuada chose Lugh as provisional king, who brought with him magical gifts from the Celtic Otherworld, including Enbarr the magical horse, Manannán's magical boat, and Fragarach. Using his spear and a sling given to him by Manannán, Lugh defeated the Fomorians and their king Balor.
