= Enbarr =

Horse in the Irish Mythological Cycle

The Enbarr (Énbarr) or Aonbharr of Manannán (Irish: Aonbharr Mhanannáin) is a horse in the Irish Mythological Cycle which could traverse both land and sea, swifter than wind-speed.

The horse was the property of the sea-god Manannan mac Lir, but provided to Lugh Lamh-fada (Irish: Luġ Lámhfhada) to use at his disposal. In the story Oidheadh Chloinne Tuireann ("The Fate of the Children of Tuireann"), Lugh refused to lend it to the sons of Tuireann, but was then forced to lend the self-navigating boat Sguaba Tuinne (Wave-sweeper) instead.

== Forms ==
Aenbharr or Aonbharr (Irish: Aonbarr) occur in Oidheadh Chloinne Tuireann.

In P.W. Joyce's retelling the horse is also called Enbarr of the Flowing Mane. The forms Énbarr, Enbhárr are given by James Mackillop's dictionary.

== Etymology ==
The meaning of this name has been variously defined. As a common noun enbarr is defined as "froth" in the medieval Cormac's glossary. (Note: Deconstructed as: "én "water" + barr "cacumen, spuma".)

The modern Irish form Aonbharr is glossed as "One Mane" by O'Curry, (Note: Deconstructed as: aon "one" + barr "hair, tip, horse's mane" by O'Curry.) "the one or unrivaled mane" by O'Curry and O'Duffy, and "unique supremacy" by James Mackillop's dictionary.

Welsh scholar John Rhys thought the name meant "she had a bird's head", and evidently considered it a mare.

== In romance ==
In the romance Oidheadh Chlainne Tuireann (OCT, The Fate of the Children of Tuireann), the Tuatha Dé Danann oppressed by tribute enforced by the Formorians gather an assembly on a hill, and Lugh arrives among an army of the "Fairy Cavalcade from the Land of Promise" (Irish: an Marcra Sidh ó Thir Tairrngire). Aonbharr of Manannán was the horse Lugh was riding. The horse was quicker than the "naked cold wind of spring", and could travel over land or sea with equal ease. It also had the property that whoever was mounted on its back could not be killed. And Lugh was dressed in various armor from the sea-god adding to his invulnerability. Note that in P. W. Joyce's retelling the fairy cavalcade appeared as "warriors, all mounted on white steeds", which suggests as embellishment that Lugh's horse was white also. (Note: It might also be noted that in The Voyage of Bran, Manannan is traveling over sea riding a chariot by glistening or shining sea-horses (Irish: gabra lir). But the sea-horses are only figurative phrasing for "crested waves" according to the DIL.)

Lugh refused to loan the horse to the sons of Tuireann, claiming that would be the loan of a loan, but in making this refusal, was later trapped into lending the self-navigating currach (coracle boat) called the "Besom of the Sea" (Irish: scuab tuinné), also called Sguaba Tuinne or Wave-sweeper.

== In popular culture ==
Enbarr appears in the 2013 video game, Final Fantasy XIV. Enbarr can be obtained through the extreme level on The Whorleater, as a random drop.

Enbarr appears as a minor character in the Nate Temple series by Shayne Silvers. He is the horse of Manannán mac Lir and is responsible for removing the main character, Quinn MacKenna, from the Otherworld and taking her to Fae.

Enbarr is the namesake of Enbarr Ltd, an Irish startup company that developed equine health management software, StablePro.

In the 2019 video game Fire Emblem: Three Houses, "Enbarr" is the name of the Imperial Capital of the Adrestian Empire.

== See also ==
- List of fictional horses
