= Danand =

Mythical Irish figure

In Irish mythology, Danand or Donann is the daughter of Delbáeth, son of Ogma, (Not to be confused with the similarly named Danu) (Note: Next, it should be pointed out that nowhere in the Lebor Gabála Érenn (Book of Conquests of Ireland) – our earliest source on the material related to the Tuatha Dé Danann, compiled between the ninth and the twelfth centuries – does Danu appear (under any form of her name) in the role of primordial mother. The one figure who appears prominently in the text and has a similar name is Danand (or Donand) daughter of Delbaeth son of Ogma, who cohabits with her own father and has three sons by him: Brian, Iuchar, and Iucharba. These three come to be known as the tri Dé Danand, the "three gods of Danand", and we are told that all the Tuatha dé Danann took their name from them, although no logical reason for this appears in the narrative, nor any sense of why the three alone are "gods".) Danand is the mother of Brian, Iuchar, and Iucharba by her own father, who is occasionally given the name Tuireann or Tuirell as well. (Note: "Donann the daughter of the same Delbaeth was mother of the three last, Brian, Iucharba and Iuchar. These were the three gods of Danu, from whom is named the Mountain of the Three gods. And that Delbaeth had the name Tuirell Bicreo." — MacAlister (1941))
