= Biróg =

Biróg (Biroge of the Mountain, Birog), in Irish folklore is the leanan sídhe or the female familiar spirit of Cian who aids him in the folktale about his wooing of Balor's daughter Eithne.

She is reinvented as a druidess in Lady Gregory and T. W. Rolleston's retellings.

== Attestations ==
A version of the folktale recorded by John O'Donovan in 1835 relates how the Fomorian warrior Balor, to frustrate a prophecy that he would be killed by his own grandson, imprisons his only daughter Eithne in the tower of Tory Island, away from any contact with men.

But Biroge of the Mountain helps a man called Mac Cinnfhaelaidh (Mac Kineely), whose magical cow (Glas Gaivlen recté Glas Gaibhnenn) Balor stole, to gain access to the tower and seduce her. Eithne gives birth to triplets, but Balor gathers them up in a sheet and sends a messenger to drown them in a whirlpool. The messenger drowns two of the babies, but unwittingly drops one in the harbour, where he is rescued by Biróg. She takes the child back to his father, who gives him to his brother, Gavida the smith, in fosterage. The boy (identified in the tale only as the "heir of Mac Kineely") who grows up to kill Balor, is more explicitly identified as Lugh in Lady Gregory and T. W. Rolleston' retelling.

Lady Gregory refers to her as Birog the druidess, and T. W. Rolleston gives her orthography as Biróg.
