= Balor =

Chief king of the Fomorians in Irish Mythology

In Irish mythology, Balor or Balar was a leader of the Fomorians, a group of malevolent supernatural beings, and considered the most formidable. He is often described as a giant with a large eye that wreaks destruction when opened. Balor takes part in the Battle of Mag Tuired, and is primarily known from the tale in which he is killed by his grandson Lugh of the Tuatha Dé Danann, son of Cian. He has been interpreted as a personification of the scorching sun, and has also been likened to figures from other mythologies, such as the Welsh Ysbaddaden and the Greek Cyclops.

== Name ==
The name Balor may come from Common Celtic *Boleros, meaning "the flashing one".

In the early literature he is also referred to as Balor Béimnech (Balor the smiter), Balor Balcbéimnech (Balor the strong smiter), Balor Birugderc (Balor of the piercing-eye), Balor mac Doit meic Néid (Balor, son of Dot son of Nét) or Balor ua Néit (Balor, grandson of Nét).

Later forms are Balor Béimeaen or Balar Bemen (Ogygia, 1685), and Balór na Súile Nimhe (Balor of the Evil Eye).

== Mythological Cycle ==
Balor first appears in the medieval texts that make up the Mythological Cycle.

Balor was the son of Dot son of Néit according to the Cath Maige Tuired (CMT), but called Balor son of Buarainech in the list of renowned rath- and castle-builders of the world, preserved in the Book of Leinster. (Note: Buar-ainech means "cow-faced" according to Arbois de Jubainville, who encourages comparison with the Celtic deity Cernunnos.) (Note: A later version of this list, in verse and prose, was made by Dubhaltach Mac Fhirbhisigh, anno 1650.) Cethlenn was Balor's wife according to O'Flaherty's Ogygia (1685). Cethlenn is mentioned by name in the Lebor Gabála Érenn (LGE), but not as a wife of Balor.

The Mythological Cycle tells of a struggle between the divine Tuatha Dé Danann and the demonic Fomorians. At the behest of Bres, the Fomorians go to war against the Tuath Dé. Balor appears as champion of the Fomorians and king of the Isles (the Hebrides), while Indech mac De was the Fomorian king; the two of them leading the Fomorian army. Balor built for Bres the fort of Rath Breisi in Connacht, according to the rath-builder list.

In the ensuing battle, the second Battle of Mag Tuired, Balor kills the Tuath Dé king Nuada Airgetlám, but Balor is himself killed by his own grandson Lugh before he had a chance to use his destructive eye. Balor's eye wreaked destruction when opened, unleashing some "power of poison", (Note: nem, neim) but it took the strength of four warriors to lift the eyelid, by grabbing the ring (handle) attached to it. Lugh shot a sling-stone (Old Irish: cloch as a tábaill, "stone from the sling") (Note: táball) at the eye, which came out the other side and harmed the Fomorian army. Balor's falling body crushed 27 Fomorian soldiers, and his head struck their king Indech.

Though not stated outright, the supposition is that Balor here is a "one-eyed giant". In one account of the battle, Lugh also killed a Fomorian leader named Goll (meaning "one-eyed"), who may be a duplication of Balor. The CMT says that Balor's eye gained its baleful power from exposure to the fumes from the magic potion his father's druids were brewing. O'Curry tantalizingly stated he was in possession of a manuscript with an alternate explanation on how Balor got his power, but does not elaborate due to lack of space.

Another description of Balor's death, dating from at least the 12th century, says he survived the loss of his eye and was chased by Lugh to Mizen Head. Lugh beheads Balor and sets the head on a large rock, which then shatters. This is said to be the origin of the headland's Irish name, Carn Uí Néit ("cairn of Nét's grandson").

== Folktale ==
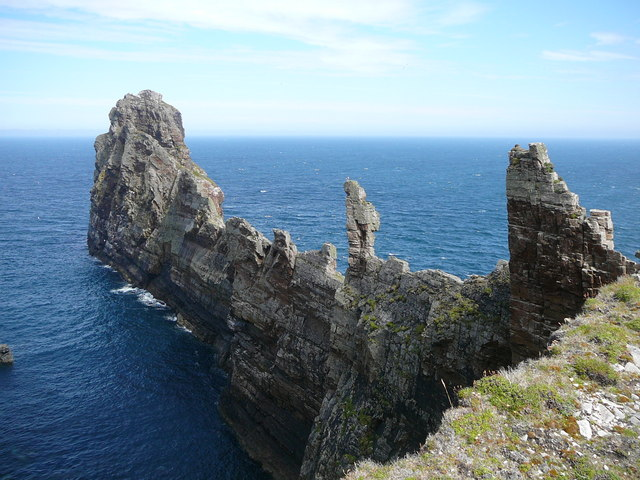
Tor Mór on Tory Island, the setting of some versions of Balor's folktale

In folklore collected during the 19th century, Balor is a warrior or tyrant who is generally said to live on Tory Island. (Note: Balor is frequently legendized as living on Tory Island, but not necessarily.) Balor hears a prophecy that he would be killed by his grandson. To avoid his fate, he locks his only daughter, Ethnea (Eithne), in a tower to keep her from becoming pregnant. Balor goes to the mainland and steals the magical cow of abundance Glas Gaibhnenn belonging to MacKineely (Cian mac Cáinte) (Note: Variant: Kian son of Contje, though he is not the owner of the cow in that version, nor related to the smith who owns it.) MacKineely/Cian learns he can only get the cow back when Balor is dead, and with the help of his female familiar spirit (leanan sídhe) named Biróg, enters the tower, finds Ethnea and impregnates her. When she gives birth to three sons, Balor orders the three to be drowned, but one survives without Balor's knowledge. The grandson is fostered by the smith who is his uncle. (Note: Or Manannán mac Lir the sea-god.) Balor eventually encounters his grandson by chance and is killed by him.

The unnamed grandson in the tale is recognizable as Lugh. In "Balor on Tory Island" and its variant, the child is called Lughaidh Lámhfhada (Lughaidh Longhand), and is recognized as an equivalent of Lugh. In the very similar Irish text "Balor agus Mac Cionnfhaolaidh", (Note: Laoide's Irish text and Curtin's "Balor on Tory Island" have the same name for the protagonist Fionn Mac Cionnfhaolaidh vs. Fin the son of Ceanfaeligh (Kinealy), and the plot-lines are similar throughout.) the child is Lugh Fadlámhach, i.e., "Lugh the long-armed". In another variant, the child is called Dul Dauna, which has been explained as a corruption of Ildanach "master of all knowledge", Lugh's nickname.

The weapon used against Balor by his grandson may be a red-hot heated iron rod, or a special red spear crafted by the smith Gaivnin Gow, the latter being of special interest to A. C. L. Brown who tries to establish connection to Arthurian lore.

=== Balor's eye ===
"Balor himself may have one, two or three eyes, one of which is poisonous, incendiary, or otherwise malignant; he may have two eyes in front, one each in front and back, an extra eye in the middle of his forehead. Lugh always puts the evil eye out", as summarized by Mark Scowcroft.

In O'Donovan's version of the folktale above, Balor has one eye in the middle of the forehead, and a deadly eye on the back of his head. It is described as both venomous, and issuing some sort of petrifying beam with powers like unto a basilisk. O'Curry deplored the dissemination of such a "peasantry" version, assisted by O'Donovan printing it. This second eye in the back does not preclude comparison with the one-eyed Cyclops of Greek myth.

In "Balor on Tory Island", Balor covers the eye in the middle of his forehead with nine leather shields, but Lugh (Lui Lavada "the Longhand") sends a red spear crafted by Gavidin Gow through all the layers. (Note: Thusin Laoide's Irish version, Lugh Fadlámhach's spear pierces seven coverings (Irish:bpilleadh>filleadh; German:Hülle) out of the nine coverings protecting Balor's eye.)

It may be that this forehead eye should be interpreted as an "extra eye in the middle of his forehead" (one of three) as Scowcroft puts it, otherwise Balor would be rendered blind most of the time. But Scowcroft does not specify the work to which he is alluding. Balor is explicitly three-eyed in a version published by William Hamilton Maxwell.

But another version of the folktale (from County Mayo) says that Balor was one-eyed, yet it was usually covered: "He had a single eye in his forehead, a venomous fiery eye. There were always seven coverings over this eye. One by one Balar removed the coverings. With the first covering the bracken began to wither, with the second the grass became copper-coloured, with the third the woods and timber began to heat, with the fourth smoke came from the trees, with the fifth everything grew red, with the sixth it sparked. With the seventh, they were all set on fire, and the whole countryside was ablaze!"

=== Severed head and lake origin tales ===
According to a lay in Duanaire Finn, after he was slain, Balor's severed head was set in the fork of an oak, and the tree which absorbed the venom became the timber-wood made into the shield of Fionn mac Cumhaill.

In "Balor on Tory Island" and the Irish text close to it, Lui Lavada (or Lugh) sets Balor's head on a rock, and a lake forms from the dripping pool of liquid. The Irish text does not specify location, but Curtin's tale in English names Gweedore Loch (in County Donegal, local to the storyteller).

According to folklore from County Sligo, Balor was said to have a glass through which he would look to destroy a person with his eye. He used the glass to burn and wither all of the plants at Moytura, which prompted a hero to ask how he did this. Balor, being duped by the trick, removed the glass from his eye long enough for the hero to put the eye out. The blood running from Balor's eye (Note: Or alternatively, a "tear" from the object he dropped.) created a lake called Suil Balra or Lochan na Súil (Lough Nasool, "lake of the eye"), near Ballindoon Abbey.

=== Localization of the legend ===
The placing of Balor's stronghold on Tory Island derives from the medieval literature, which places the Fomorians' stronghold there. On Tory Island there are geological features called Dún Bhalair ("Balor's fortress") and Túr Bhalair ("Balor's tower"), and a tall rock formation called Tór Mór ("great tower").

Although the Tory Island version of the folktale printed by O'Donovan was influential, this may have misled the public with the impression that "Tory has almost a monopoly of Balor traditions", so argues Henry Morris. O'Donovan said that Balor was remembered "throughout Ireland". The Balor tales involving the magic cow were also being told plentifully elsewhere, particularly "South of Ulster". Morris stated he had collected "remnants" in Farney, Monaghan c. 1900, and that these versions connected Balor and the cow Glasgaivlen with places as far afield as "south Monaghan to Rockabill Island off the coast of Dublin". (Note: Another piece of lore localized in southern Ulster (Breifni region, which spans counties) connects Enniskillen in present-day Northern Ireland, to Balor's wife Cethlenn. The town was named after an island castle on the River Erne, and popular legend has come to associate the castle with this Fomorian queen. Morris further contends that the village Glengevlin had been named after Balor's cow.)

== Interpretations ==
Some have interpreted Balor as symbolizing a solar deity of the old year, struggling with the solar god of the new year, namely Lugh. Folklorist Alexander Haggerty Krappe subscribed to this notion. He suggests that the myth and others like it could be metaphors for yearly cycles of growth, death, and re-growth. Krappe hypothesized that the myth is of ancient origin, with Balor representing winter and the old year, confining the woman who represents the fertile earth.

Dáithí Ó hÓgáin interprets Balor as personifying the harmful aspects of the sun, such as the scorching sun that would bring crop failure and drought. He speculates that the imagery of Balor is a conflation of a Bronze Age Celtic sun god with the Greek Cyclops. Both Ó hÓgáin and Máire MacNeill believe that Lugh's slaying of Balor was originally a harvest myth associated with the festival of Lughnasa and the later tale of Saint Patrick overcoming Crom Dubh. Ó hÓgáin also believes that the hero Fionn's conflict with figures named Goll (meaning "one-eyed"), Áed (meaning "fire") and Aillen (the burner) stems from Lugh's conflict with Balor.

=== Parallels ===
The parallel between Balor and Ysbaddaden from Welsh mythology has been noted by several commentators, but for different reasons. Each is a giant whose eyelid takes several men to lift (using a ring handle vs. lifting with forks); each has a spear cast at him and loses an eye; and each is unwilling to give away his daughter to the bridal-quester.

Since the mid-19th century, Balor has been likened to figures from Greek mythology, especially the Cyclops. James O'Laverty noted the parallel with Acrisius, the King of Argos who was fated to be killed by his grandson, the hero Perseus. This parallel has been pursued at length by others.

O'Laverty also ventured that the name "Balor" may be linked to the name of the Greek hero Bellerophon. Arbois de Jubainville argued that the name "Bellerophon" means "slayer of Belleros" and that this is another name for the Chimera. He asserts that both the Chimera and Balor are monsters that spew flame or thunderbolts.

However, de Jubainville (and others) also seized on another comparison: between Balor and Argos the many-eyed watchman of the white cow Io. Since the destroyer of the former is Lugh, and of the latter is Hermes, this neatly fits into the framework of identifying the Celtic Hermes with Lugh.

Krappe lists six elements that are found in other myths: the prophecy of being slain by his own descendant; the precaution of locking the daughter in a tower; the seduction of the daughter by a stranger, who needs to use magic to gain access; the birth of a boy and the attempt to drown him; the fostering of the boy, and the fulfillment of the prophecy by the boy killing his grandparent.

Krappe drew parallel between Balor with the supposed Serbian vy mentioned by W. R. S. Ralston, but unfortunately Krappe misreads Ralston and utterly confounds this "vy" with what is actually the "Aged One" character (or "old, old man", the witch's husband) in the Russian skazka Ivan Bykovich ("Ivan the Bull's Son"). (Note: Krappe footnotes thus (p. 4 n15): "But Slavonic folk-lore knows of a similar monster, called Vy by the Servians. He 'lies on an iron couch.. and sends for 'twelve mighty heroes', and order them to take iron forks and lift up the hair about his eyes". But he erroneously made this an attestation of Serbian lore, when in fact Ralston was paraphrasing from the Russian Ivan Bykovich. Compare with a modern rendering of the Russian tale Ivan Bykovich: "the witch's husband, who was lying on a bed of iron" et sqq. ("twelve mighty knights", "pitchfork").) In actuality, the heavy eyelid/eyebrow motif occurs in Ivan Bykovich, but not specifically ascribed to the vy by Ralston.

Parallels have also been noted in the etymologies and mythic structures between Lugh's slaying of Balor and Loki's slaying of Baldr with additional etymological parallels noted between the theonyms Belenus and Belin (Slovenian deity).

== Cultural references ==
Cyathophycus balori, a species of sponge, was named after Balor after a 315-million-year-old fossilised remnant of the sponge was discovered by the Cliffs of Moher in Ireland.

== See also ==
- Crom Cruach, Crom Dubh
- Irish mythology in popular culture: Balor
- Viy#Folkloric sources
- Belenus
