= Glas Gaibhnenn =

Cow in Irish folklore

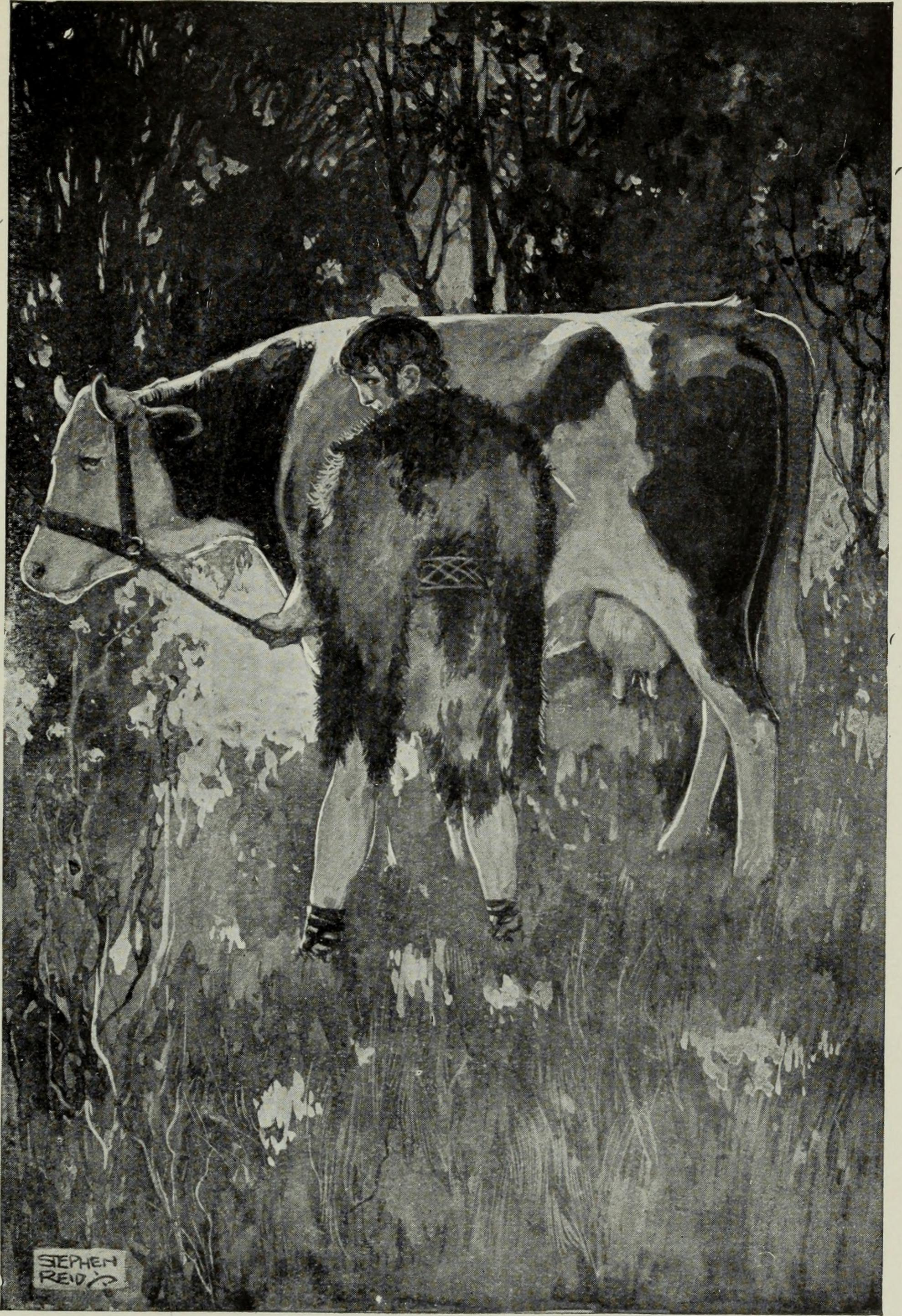
Kian's Magic cow and red-haired boy (Balor in disguise). ―illustr. by Stephen Reid, in T. W. Rolleston (1910) Myths and Legends.

Glas Gaibhnenn (Irish: Glas Gaibhnenn, Glas Ghaibhleann; Hiberno-English: Glas Gaivlen; Gloss Gavlen: pronunciation guide:/glas-gav-e-lan/;), in Irish folklore, is a prized fabulous cow of bounty (fertility) that yields profuse quantities of milk.

The cow is owned variously by a smith who may be named Gaivnin (hence reinforcing the notion that the cow's name is eponymous after him) or by the hero Cian mac Cáinte (sometimes called Mac Kineely), equivalent to Cian father of Lugh of mythology. The cow is stolen (or craftily regained) by Balar or Balor the strong-smiter. The hero, in order to fulfill the quest to recover the cow, is transported by a banshee to a tower where Balor's daughter is sequestered, to produce a child destined to kill Balor.

== Name ==
The normalized Irish: Glas Gaibhnenn is O'Donovan's correction to the raw transcription Glas Gaivlen given by the storyteller; A different phonetic transcription Gloss Gavlen is given by Larminie. O'Donovan spelled the cow's name as Glas Gaibhneach elsewhere. Additional spellings are: Glas Gamhain, Glas Gamhnach.

=== Descriptive etymology ===
The Glas is given as "the green (cow)" by John O'Donovan in his recension of the folktale concerning the cow. Whereas the full name means "Grey (cow) of the Smith" according to Larminie, and "Goibniu's Grey or Brindled (Cow)" according to Rhys. The "white heifer" Glassdhablecana's name is glossed as "the grey-flanked-cow" in one variant tale. James Mackillop state the cow was "white with green spots".

So while commentators agree that glas "blue, green, gray, etc." is the colour of the cow's coat, they are at considerable variance in describing it.

=== Eponym ===
While O'Donovan's reconstructed gaibhnenn was construed as meaning "~of the smith" by Larminie, Welsh scholar John Rhys went further and said its specified a cow possessed by Goibniu the Smith. (Note: Note that this interpretation is precluded for O'Donovan's version, where the smith is not the owner of the cow, unless additional explanation is furnished.)

In the folktales, the name of the smith appears as Gavidjeen, Gavida, Gabshegonal, or Gaivnin, some which are close to the form of the owner's name for the cow.

=== Farrow cow ===
But the bovine creature's Irish name can also be broken down to glas (colour) and gamuin "calf, yearling", as have been indicated by the Rev. Patrick Power, church historian and writer on topographical names.

However, Jeremiah Curtin explains this differently: the form Glas Gainach which appears in one of his tales contain a corruption of gaunach which is a cow with a yearling calf, which hasn't calved in the current year (a farrow cow). And the form Glas Gavlen in his Donegal version references the cow-herder's term gavlen for a cow that has not calved in five years.

== Mythological meaning ==
Power listed Glas Gamhain and Bó Bhán "white cow" (associated with Boann) as among names of mythological creatures after which landscape features or bodies of water were often named, while Patricia Monaghan wrote of Glas Ghaibhleann as a goddess often associated with rivers, and that rivers were often seen as embodiments of the goddess Boann. O'Donovan also observes that Glas Teamhrach was a "famous cow" associated with a mound on Tara.

== Retellings ==
The folk-tale plot has been made familiar through retellings of Irish mythology, notably by Lady Gregory, but also others where we learn that Cian mounts on a quest to recover the magic cow, has a romantic encounter with Balor's daughter, fathering the child who is to become Lugh. The retelling was stitched together using additional bona fide medieval mythological writings to form a seamless retelling.

=== Lady Gregory's version ===
Lady Gregory's reworked version can be summarized as follows: Balor of the Strong Blows (or the Evil Eye) learns from his druids that he is fated to be slain by his own grandson. Consequently, he sequesters his only daughter Ethlinn. (Note: Called "Ethnea" in O'Donovan's footnoted version.) Around this time, at a place called Druim na Teine ("the Ridge of the Fire") lived three brothers, (Note: "druim na teine (hill of fire)" occurs in Curtin (1911), p. 284.) Goibniu the smith, Samthainn, (Note: Squire (1913), p. 450, "Pronunciation Guide" may provide some clue as to pronunciation; it gives Samhain /'sa̯v-ïñ/ and Scathach /'skɑh-ɑx/. Note disagreement with Gregory (1905), pp. 472–473 which gives Samain as "sow-in" and Schathniamh as "Scau-nee-av". Rolleston changes the spelling to "Sawan".) and Cian together with the wonderful cow Glas Gaibhnenn. But one day when Cian comes to Goibniu's forge to have his sword wrought, leaving the other brother Samthain in charge of the cow, Balor comes along to trick Samthain into abandoning his guard, and steals away the cow back to his own island across the strait. Cian, seeks help from a druidess (and member of the Tuatha De Danann) named "Birog of the Mountain" who informs him that the cow could never be recovered while Balor was alive. With a blast of wind she conveys Cian to Balor's tower, and penetrating the prison, allows Cian opportunity for a tryst with Balor's daughter. In the retelling, the focus switches now to the fate of the child Lugh who is born between them, so the eventual fate of the cow remains untold.

Lady Gregory makes Balor's abode to be a Glass Tower, and it was written that a glass tower stood on Tory Island (in Nennius's Historia Brittonum).

== Larminie's collected folktale ==
William Larminie's collected version of the folk-tale, entitled "The Gloss Gavlen" was published later than the other example, but is discussed first since it retains the name Kian for the protagonist (The uncorrupted Irish form of this protagonist's name is thought to be Cian mac Cáinte).

Larminie's version has two parts, and begins with a carpenter named Gobaun Seer (Gobán Saor, "Goban the Builder") hired to build a fine castle for Balar Beimann ("Balor of the Mighty Blows") to boast. To prevent other lords from hiring the carpenter to build another castle to outdo his, Balar plots the carpenter's death. Gobaun survives, thanks to the warnings from Balar's daughter, and now proclaims he cannot perfect his work without his three specially named tools, which he makes Balor's son fetch from his home. Upon receiving this errand-bearer, the carpenter's wife deduces the situation, and slams shut Balor's son inside the tool-chest, and with the boy as hostage demands from Balor due wages and her husband's safe return. (Note: This first half closely follows "The Goban Saer" by E. W. (Edward Walsh) published in 1833, except that there the opponent is an English king.)

The second part begins with the carpenter recommends the smith Gavidjeen Go (cf. Gaivnin Gow in another version; Irish: gobha, gabha 'smith') to do the ironworks for the castle, and advises the blacksmith to refuse all rewards except "the Gloss", the cow which can fill twenty barrels. Balar obliged, but played the wily trick of not giving him the special "byre rope," without which the cow would stray off. The smith therefore now owned the cow but was at constant risk it may stray off, compelling him to hire champions on a daily basis to escort the cow safely back and forth from pasture, offering the forging of a sword in payment for any takers who would accept the task.

In this latter half of the tale, "Kian son of Contje" (Irish: Cian mac Cáinte) takes the offer to obtain his sword, but by carelessness allows the cow to wander off. He must now submit his head on the anvil block to have it chopped off, but requests three days of amnesty, and goes off to recover the cow. At the shore, he finds waiting "Mananaun son of Lir" in a coracle, ready to ferry him off to the whereabouts of the cow, in exchange for half of whatever Kian profits from the quest. In the land of cold, where meat is eaten raw, Kian is hired as cook, storyteller, and fireman (fire-stoker?). Thanks to Mananaun's lockpicking magic, Kian is able to frequent the chambers of Balor's daughter. When the girl bears him a son, Kian begs leave from Balor's service, and taking the infant and the byre rope, boards Mananaun's coracle. Balar discovers the situation and raises great waves and flames at sea, but Mananaun counteracts these with his greater magical prowess. Mananaun for his help obtains the child with Kian's blessing, and fosters him under the name of Dal Dauna. (This is explained as a corruption of Ildanach "master of all knowledge", the usual nickname for Lugh. This child one day happens upon the sight of Balar sailing past in his fleet, and tosses a dart in his pocket at Balar, thus killing him.

This first part has been recognized as a stock tale of the same type as the legends surrounding the Strasburg Clock and the "Prentice Pillar".

== O'Donovan's collected folktale ==
In an independently collected cognate tale, Gavida, Mac Samhthiann or Mac Samthainn, and Mac Kineely (Irish: Mac Cinnḟaelaiḋ (Mac Cinnfhaelaidh)) are three brothers living on the coast of County Donegal, and across the strait on Tory Island lived Balor, who had one eye in front of his head, and another in the back, with the ability to petrify those caught in his gaze. Among the three brethren Gavida was the smith, and his forge was at the Druim na Teine ("ridge of the fire").

Mac Kineely (who corresponds to Cian) was a lord of some districts and owned the coveted cow, the Glas Gaivlen, which produced milk aplenty. Balor receives prophesy from his druids that he was destined to fall by the hands of his grandson. So he locks away his daughter Ethnea in a tower built upon an inaccessible and towering rockscape called the Tor-More. Balor landed ashore to steal the cow. Mac Kineely had business with the smith, and, out of his usual habit, had entrusted the halter of the cow to his other brother. Balor then came up to this brother (Mac Samthainn) and whispered him a lie that the other two were secretly colluding to use up all his steel to build Mac Kineely's sword, and to make his out of iron," tricking him into rushing off to investigate. By the time the brothers realised, Balor had already rowed halfway down the strait with the cow on his boat. Mac Kineely had a leanan-sidhe (familiar sprite) by the name of "Biroge of the Mountain," and she would assist him in trying to vanquish Balor to recover the cow. This banshee was only able to sow the seeds of Balor's destruction, and it is not clear if the cow was ever recovered. On the wings of a storm she brought Mac Kineeley, dressed in woman's guise, into the tower where Balor's daughter lived trapped, attended by twelve matrons. Mac Kineely and the maiden fell in love, and they had three sons. Balor discovered this and slew Mac Kineely by a certain rock, whose red stains were still visible in the days when the folk tale was recited.

Of the three infants, just one managed to survive, and adopted by the smith Gavida, was raised as his apprentice. One day, Balor appeared on the forge, and ordered some spears to be made when only the apprentice was at the workshop. Balor let slip the fact that he had killed Mac Kineely, not realizing the apprentice was the bereaved son (not named, but presumably the equivalent of Lugh). The apprentice, pretending to slave away at the forge, awaited his chance and "taking a glowing rod from the furnace, thrust it through the Basilisk eye of Balor," thus exacting his revenge.

== Local geographical legend and Fenian Cycle ==
The remains of a dolmen in Shallee, County Clare is called the Leaba-na-glaise or the "Bed of the Cerulean Cow" (i.e., bed of Glas the green cow), and is alleged to be the property of a mythical smith, either Mac Kineely (same name as the hero of the prior tale), or Lon Mac Liomhtha (apparently the smith who forged the sword Mac an Luin). In the same county lies Slieve-n-glaise (Slievenaglasha) and one dolmen in particular erected on its slope was called Carrick-na-glaise, reputedly the abode of Lon mac Liomhtha the smith.

O'Donovan has gathered further Fenian lore, according to which, Lon the smith who took up residence here was said to be a member of the Tuatha Dé Danann. He had an extra pectoral arm for holding his tong ("Two of the hands were in the usual position, and the third, with which he turned the iron of the anvil, while he hammered with the other two, grew from the middle of his breast.") and one leg to hop on (or rather take huge leaps and bounds upon). He was for many years nourished by the cow Glas Gaibhneach which he stole from Spain, and the cow was pastured on the mountain of Sliabh-na-Glaise, not far from the forge, for no other place in Ireland was fertile enough. "This cow would fill with her milk any vessel,.. at one milking". Two women wagering on whether a vessel could be found to outsize her capacity, and when a sieve was produced, the cow's milk caused seven overflooding streams to pour forth. Also it was said "the hoofs of this cow were reversed", and the backward tracks always fooled the potential cattle-thieves in pursuit. Lon later visited Finn mac Cumhail and challenged the Fianna to a race. The fleet-footed Caílte mac Rónáin outran him in a race to the Leaba-na-Glaise, but Lon revealed the race was a friendly subterfuge to bring him to his forge so he can start crafting superior weapons for his band of Fianna warriors. (Note: Cow legend collected from John Reagh O'Cahane, tailor, of Corofin", County Clare, also described as a senachie, originally transcribed in O'Donovan, O.S.L. [Ordnance Survey Letters] $\tfrac{14}{B.23}$ p. 68, Reprinted in O'Donovan & O'Curry (1997). The cow material from the O.S.L. are reworked in Borlase (1897), 3: 883–887 and in Westropp (1895), pp. 227–229.)

== Onomastics of County Cork ==
The Rev. Patrick Power's Place Names and Antiquities of S. E. Cork (1917) describes several place names in the county popularly associated with a legendary cow, the Bó Bhán (white cow) and Glas Gaibhneach/Gamhain/Gamhnach (he gives these three spellings). (Note: Power also gives Bó Rhiabhach and Capall Caoch in the list. The former denotes a "brindled cow" (cf. ríabach), the latter a "blind horse". The Bó Bhán (white cow) is associated with the goddess Boann.)

According to Power, in the townland of Foaty (on Fota Island), in County Cork, was a pond known as Loch na Bó "Lake of the Cow", which was "supposed to derive its name from a legendary cow ― the Bó Bhán or the Glas Gaibhneach".

And in Ballyoran townland (near Fermoy) is a "Gownach Well" i.e., the well of Gamhnach, a yearling heifer which may be a reference to the legendary Glas Gaibhnenn (Note: "Part of the River Ilen to the west of Skibbereen is called "Gownach".)

== List of Folktales ==
There are three versions of this tale type in one anthology by Curtin. William John Gruffydd gives summary of several versions. (Note: Gruffydd (1928), pp. 65–76 apud Bruford.)

- "Glas Gaivlen" (oral) (provisional title), told by Shane O'Dugan, Tory Island, 1835.
- "The Legend of Ballar", published 1837.。
- "The Gloss Gavlen" (oral), told by John McGinty, Achill Island.
- "The Cow" (title per Borlase), told by John Reagh O'Cahane, tailor and seanachie, of Corofin, County Clare. (Note: Excerpted with commentary by Borlase, and adapted (paraphrased) by Westropp.)
- "Elin Gow, the Swordsmith from Erin, and the Cow Glas Gainach" (tale 1), told by Maurice Lynch, Mount Eagle, West (sic.) of Dingle, County Kerry.
- "Balor on Tory Island", from Michale Curran, Gortahork, County Donegal.
- "Balor of the Evil Eye and Lui Lavada his Grandson", from Colman Gorm, Connemara.
- "Balor agus Mac Cionnfhaolaidh" (in Irish)
