= Sanas Cormaic =

Medieval Irish glossary

Sanas Cormaic (Irish pronunciation: [ˈsˠanˠəsˠ ˈkɔɾˠəmˠəc]; or Sanas Chormaic, Irish for "Cormac's narrative"), also known as Cormac's Glossary, is an early Irish glossary containing etymologies and explanations of over 1,400 Irish words, many of which are difficult or outdated. The shortest and earliest version of the work is ascribed to Cormac mac Cuilennáin (d. 903), king-bishop of Munster. It is an encyclopedic dictionary containing simple synonymous explanations in Irish or Latin of Irish words. In some cases, he attempts to give the etymology of the words, and in others, he concentrates on an encyclopedic entry. It is held to be the earliest vernacular dictionary in any of the non-classical languages of Europe. Many of its entries are still frequently cited in Irish and Celtic scholarship.

== Manuscripts and editions (with external links) ==
The glossary survives, in part or whole, in at least six manuscripts. The work may have been included in the Saltair Chaisil ("Psalter of Cashel"), a now-lost manuscript compilation that is thought to have contained various genealogical and etiological lore relating to Munster. The versions of Sanas Cormaic divide into two groups: the earliest and shortest version represented by Leabhar Breac and the fragment in MS Laud 610, and a longer one represented by the Yellow Book of Lecan, which underwent some expansion in the hands of later redactors.

Siglum	Manuscripts	Source	Editions and translations
A (B)	Leabhar Breac: Dublin, Royal Irish Academy, MS 1230 (23 P 16), pp.263–72.		Stokes, Whitley (ed.). Three Irish Glossaries: Cormac's Glossary, O'Davoren's Glossary and a Glossary to the Calendar of Oengus the Culdee. London: Williams and Norgate, 1862. 1-44.; Edition (pp 1–44) in HTML markup available from Thesaurus Linguae Hibernicae.; PDF available from Internet Archive.; Stokes, Whitley (ed.) and John O'Donovan (tr.). Sanas Cormaic: Cormac's Glossary. Irish Archaeological and Celtic Society. Calcutta: O.T. Cutter, 1868.; PDF available from Google Books.
G (La)	MS Laud 610: Oxford, Bodleian Library MS Laud 610, f. 79r-84r. Fragment corresponding to YBL, 756–1224.		Stokes, Whitley (ed. and tr.). "On the Bodleian Fragment of Cormac's Glossary." Transactions of the Philological Society (1891–94): 149–206.
B (Y)	Yellow Book of Lecan (YBL): Dublin, TCD MS 1318 (H.2.16), cols. 3-87 (= pp. 255a-283a in facsimile edition).		Meyer, Kuno (ed.). "Sanas Cormaic." In Anecdota from Irish Manuscripts 4 (1912): I-XIX, 1–128.
C (H)	MS 1317: Dublin, TCD MS 1317 (MS H.2.15), pp. 13–39 (written by Fland) and pp. 77–102 (written by Dubhaltach Mac Firbhisigh).		See Early Irish Glossaries.
F (L)	Book of Leinster: Dublin, TCD MS 1339 (H.2.18), p. 179a-b. Fragment, corresponding to YBL 1224-34 and 1268–75.		Best, R.I. and M.A. O’Brien (eds.). Book of Leinster. Vol. 4. Dublin, 1965. pp. 780–1.; Stokes, Whitley (ed.). Three Irish Glossaries. London, 1862. pp. 44–5.
M	Leabhar Ua Maine = Dublin, RIA, MS D II 1 (MS 1225), pp. 177a-184a. Beginning, corresponding to YBL nos. 1–1224.		Meyer, Kuno. "Cormacs Glossar nach der Handschrift des Buches der Uí Maine." Abhandlungen der Königlichen Preußischen Akademie der Wissenschaften, Phil.-hist. Klasse (1919): 290–319.
	Dublin, RIA, MS 23 N 10: p. 74 ff. Entry for Prull.		Thurneysen, Rudolf (ed.). "Zu Cormacs Glossar." In Festschrift Ernst Windisch. Leipzig, 1914. pp. 8–37. PDF available from Google Books US.
	London, British Museum Library, Harleian 5280: f 75r-v. Entries for Mug Éme and Prull.		ibidem.

== Content ==
The Sanas takes the form of an alphabetical list of words with information about their history, etymology, meaning and their surrounding legends.

=== Mogheime ===
Under the entry for Mogheime (or "Mug-éime": oircne) Cormac describes a folk etymology surrounding the introduction of the first lap dog to Ireland. In parts, he epitomises the Book of Armagh, invoking the myth of Falinis. He describes how British law allowed for expropriation of criminals as chattels in compensation for a crime (i.e. law code of Æthelberht): therefore, when Coirpre caught the dog gnawing on his dagger, he claimed the dog for himself and brought it back to Ireland. The passage describes the claim of sovereignty by the Gaels over the whole of mainland Britain in the sub Roman period. Gildas describes how the Anglo-Saxons were initially invited to Britain as mercenaries to defend against the Picts and Scots.

Mug-eime, the name of the first lap-dog that was in Ireland. Coirpre Músc, son of Conaire, brought it from the east, from Britain. For when great was the power of the Gael over Britain, they divided Scotland amongst them in districts, and each of them knew his friend's habitation, and the Gael dwelt on the east of the sea no less than in Scotia, and their residences and royal forts were built there. Inde dicitur Dinn Tradui, i. e. Dún Tredue .i. the three-fossed fort of Crimthan Mór, son of Fidach, king of Ireland and Albion and down to the Ictian sea, et inde Glasimpere nanGáedel (Glastonbury of the Irish) a church on the border of the Ictian sea. (There was Glass son of Cass, swineherd of the king of Hiruath, with his swine feeding, and he it was that Patrick raised from the dead twenty-six years after he had been killed by the champions of Mac Con.) In that part is the fort of Map Lethain, in the lands of the Cornish Britons i. e. fort of Mac Lethain, for mac is the same as map in British. Thus did each tribe of them (di suidiv) divide, for there was an equal proportion on the east, and they possessed that power long after the coming of Patrick.

Then was Coirpre Músc paying a visit in the east to his family and his friends. At that time a lap dog had never come into the Land of Erin: the Britons forbade that one should be given to the Gael for asking, or through free will, or through gratitude or friendship for the Gael. At that time the Britons had a law, to wit, "Every criminal for his crime who shall break the law". There was a beautiful lapdog in the possession of a friend of Coirpre Musc's in Britain, and Coirpre got it from him [thus]. Once Coirpre went to his house, and great welcome was made to him, except concerning the lap-dog. Coirpre Músc had a splendid dagger, with ornamentation of silver and gold on its hilt. It was a marvellous treasure. Now Coirpre put a great deal of grease about it, and rubbed fat on its hilt, and then left it before the lapdog. The lap-dog took to gnawing the hilt till morning. It wounded (loitid) the dagger then, so that it was not lovely. Next day Coirpre made great complaint of this, and was [seemingly] mournful (or wrathful) about it, and demanded justice for it from his friend. "That is fair," and he said "I will pay* for the crime" (cin), said he. Said Coirpre: "I will take nothing but what is in the Britons,) law, namely, every criminal for his crime." So then the lap-dog was given to Coirpre, and the name clave to it, namely Mug-éime, 'slave of the hilt', mug [= Goth. magus], i. e. a slave that was given on account of the hilt.

The lap dog, which was a bitch, was with young. Ailill Flann the Little was ruler of Munster at that time, and Cormac grandson of Conn was at Tara, and these three began to quarrel, asking for and contending about the lap-dog. This is the way in which the matter was settled between the three, namely, the dog spent a certain time in the house of each of them. The dog thereafter littered, and each of them got a pup from the litter. In that way then descends every lap-dog still in Ireland.

After a long time the lap-dog died, and Connla, son of Tadg, son of Cían, son of Ailill Olum, found that lap-dog's bare skull, and brought it home to test a poet who had come with an ái or airchetul to his father. Máen mac Edaini was the poet's name. Máen the bard then solved it through teinm laeda, and said ac Cain tonna etc. There is the head of Mug-éme, namely, the first lap-dog that ever was brought to Ireland.
