= Patrick Power (historian) =

Irish historian of the Catholic Church in Ireland

Canon Patrick Power (8 March 1862 – 16 October 1951), was a noted historian of the Catholic Church in Ireland. He was born on 8 March 1862, in Callaghane, Co. Waterford and educated at the Catholic University School and St. John's College, Waterford.

Power was ordained a priest and worked in Liverpool and Australia and was later attached to Waterford Cathedral. He was also a diocesan schools inspector and lecturer in archaeology at St Patrick's College, Maynooth between 1910 and 1931. He was Professor of Archaeology at University College Cork between 1915 and 1934, and a member of the Royal Irish Academy. During his time in Cork he was awarded a D.Litt., by the National University of Ireland. He was also appointed a Canon of the Catholic Church.

He died 16 October 1951.

== Works ==
- Places and Names of Decies (1907)
- Parochial History of Waterford and Lismore (1912; 1937)
- Lives of Declan and Mochuda (ITS 1914)
- Place Names and Antiquities of S. E. Cork (1917)
- Ardmore-Deaglain (1919)
- Prehistoric Ireland (1922)
- Early Christian Ireland (1925)
- The Ancient Topography of Fermoy (1931)
- A Bishop of the Penal Times (1932)
- A Short History of Co. Waterford (1933)
- The Cathedral and Priory of the Holy Trinity, Waterford (1942)
- He was also the editor of the Journal of Waterford and S. E. Ireland Archaeological Society.
