= Cian =

Mythical character

In Irish mythology, Cian or Cían (Irish pronunciation: [ciənˠ]), nicknamed Scal Balb, was the son of Dian Cecht, the physician of the Tuatha Dé Danann, and best known as the father of Lugh Lamhfada. Cían's brothers were Cu, Cethen, and Miach.

Cían was slain by the Sons of Tuireann, for which Lugh demanded various treasures around the world as éraic (compensation), according to the account in the "Book of Invasions" (Lebor Gabála Érenn, LGE) as well as the late romance version "The Fate of the Children of Tuireann".

== Name ==
Cían means "enduring one"; cían signifying "long, enduring, far, distant".

Scal Balb is a nickname borne by other personages and means "dumb champion", with "dumb" in the sense of unable to make speech.

By most accounts, Lug's mother is the Fomorian princess Ethniu, but according to an interpolated text the LGE, Cían is also known by the name Ethlend (Ethlenn). Under that assumption, "Lug mac Ethlend" becomes a patronymic (rather than a matronymic) designation. A clearly patronymic instance, from a different source altogether, is "Lug mac Ethlend maic Tigernmais (son of Ethliu, son of Tigernmas)" in the story Baile an scáil, where Lug's father must be "Ethliu mac Tigernmais". (Note: But Tigernmas was a high king of Ireland, and Macalister rather derisively comments on the confusion of cycles here.)

== Genealogy ==
In the saga Cath Maige Tuired, Cían's union with Ethniu is a dynastic marriage following an alliance between the Tuatha Dé Danann and the Fomorians, and Ethniu bore him a son, Lugh. In the Lebor Gabála Érenn (LGE, "The Book of Invasions"), Cían gives the boy Lugh to Tailtiu, queen of the Fir Bolg, in fosterage.

His brothers are Cu, Cethen, and Miach, sons of Dian Cecht, according to a tract in the LGE. (Note: The same tract notes that the fourth son Miach was often not reckoned.)

Cían, Cu and Cethen are called "three sons of Cáinte (English: Cainté)" in the romance version of "The Fate of the Children of Tuireann", with O'Curry commenting that the identity of Cáinte is uncertain. (Note: Rhys suggests cainte means "satirist", and attempts to make connection to a wonder tale about a certain Cían, son of Ailill Aulom, or ollamh "poet".)

== Death and revenge ==
Cían's demise, and the consequent revenge by his son, Lugh, forcing on the perpetrators the impossible quest for treasures is told in [A]Oidheadh Chloinne Tuireann (ACT or OCT, "The Fate of the Children of Tuireann"), the full romance of which only survives in late manuscripts (16th century), though synopses of the tale survive in medieval redactions of the LGE.

In the story, Cían was killed by the sons of Tuireann —Brian, Iuchar and Iucharba — after trying unsuccessfully to escape from them in the form of a pig (actually a "lapdog", Irish: oircce in older tradition, e.g. the LGE).

Lug set them a series of seemingly impossible quests as recompense (Irish: éraic). They achieved them all but were fatally wounded in completing the last one. Despite Tuireann's pleas, Lug denied them the use of one of the items they had retrieved, the magic pigskin of Tuis that healed all wounds. (Note: The denied remedy is altered to the "apples of the Garden of Hesperides" in P. W. Joyce's version.) They died of their wounds, and Tuireann died of grief over their bodies.

== Marriage ==
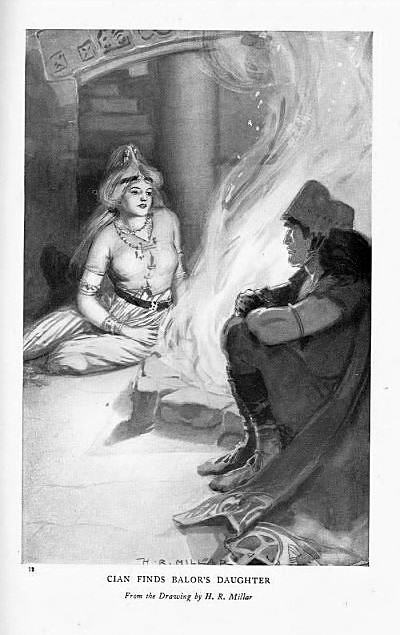
Cían and Balor's daughter (Ethnea). ―illstr. H. R. Millar, Charles Squire's Celtic Myth and Legend (1905)

There may have been a fuller account of Cían's bridal quest in medieval tradition, but they have only survived in orally transmitted folktales. (Note: Brown (1924), pp. 87–88 also refers to the Glas Gaibhnenn tales as "recently collected folk-tale versions" and counts them as valid source of ancient tradition. The tale specimens "confirm" the speech by Balor's wife in OCT that once Lugh is ascendant "we shall never again have power in Erin", and "supply another point" (that Balor can only be killed by a particular weapon).) The folktale concerns the magical cow Glas Gaibhnenn (or Glas Ghaibhleann).

=== Cian's names in folklore ===
The name of the hero should be Cian mac Cáinte in proper Irish, (Note: There did exist a literary treatment of the exploits of this hero written down in the Irish tongue, and the possibility this included the cow episode has been speculated (Bruford (1966), p. 162).) but is phonetically transcribed as Kian mac Kontje in the tale "The Gloss Gavlen", collected by Larminie.

The hero's name corrupted to Mac Cinnfhaelaidh (Mac Kineely, MacKineely or MacKenealy) in a different version of the tale printed in footnote by John O'Donovan. (Note: Tale told to O'Donovan by Shane O'Dugan of Tory Island in 1835.) This name "Mac Cinnfhaelaidh" has been explained to mean "Son of Wolf's Head" (genitive of Irish: cenn "head" + genitive of fáel "wolf").

The hero is Fin MacKinealy in "Balor on Tory Island" collected by Curtin, and echoed as Fionn mac Cionnfhaolaidh in its Irish version edited by Lloyd (Seosamh Laoide). In these, the siblings are named Gial Duv (Irish: Giolla Dubh) and Donn. (Note: Arthur C. L. Brown notes three versions in Curtin: pp. 1–34 (Kerry); pp. 283–295 (Donegal); pp. 296–311 (Connemara). Brown also notes he was informed of Lloyd (Seosamh Laoide)'s version in Irish.)

In another folkloric version of the tale, the hero is the younger of two (unnamed) sons of Kien Mac Caunthca.

=== Synopsis of O'Donovan's version ===
The synopsis of the cow tale as printed by O'Donovan is as follows; the tale has also been retold by Lady Gregory, and her emendations will be noted below as well.

In a place called Druim na Teine or "Fiery Ridge" (Drumnatinny, County Donegal) where a forge was kept, there lived three brothers, Gavida, Mac Samthainn and Mac Cinnfhaelaidh. (Note: Mac Cinnfhaelaidh is Cian, and Mac Samthainn is Samthainn of Lady Gregory's retelling.) Across the sea on Tory Island there lived a famous warrior named Balor, with one eye in the middle of the forehead, and another eye with a basilisk-like power in the back of his head. (Note: The folktale does not explicitly call Balor a Fomorian, but he is "Balor, King of the Fomor" in the preceding passages of Lady Gregory's GAFM (p. 16). O'Donovan in his preceding remarks notes that the memory of Balor "general of the Fomorians is still vividly remembered.. throughout Ireland" (p. 18).) (Note: The flowery description of Balor such as "float among the peasantry" was lamented by O'Curry, and the details are eschewed by Lady Gregory, who replaces it with an account from CMT which O'Curry suggests deserves more attention.)

Balor learns from a druid's prophecy that he will be killed by his own grandson. To prevent this he imprisons his only daughter Ethnea in the tower which stands on a tall rock formation called the Tor Mór, or "Great Tower". (Note: The spelling is "Toremore" as occurs in the original printed by O'Donovan, but Arbois de Jubainville gives tor-mor glossed as "great tower". Note that the tower of Conan mac Febrail the Fomorian is recontexted and referred to as "Tower of Glass" floating in the sea in Nennius's geography of Ireland. In Lady Gregory's retelling, Balor lives in the Glass Tower, and his daughter (given the name Ethlinn for consistency) is locked up in "the tower on the island".)

Mac Kineely (=Cian) owns a prolific milch-cow called "Glos Gavlin" (recté Irish: Glas Gaibhnenn), which is coveted by everyone including Balor. While the cow is in the care of Mac Kineely's brother Mac Samthainn, Balor appears in the form of a little red-haired boy and tricks him into handing him the cow. Mac Kineely=Cian wishes to reclaim the cow, but is advised that he can only succeed when Balor is dead. Cian then consults Biroge (Biróg) of the Mountain, who is his leanan sídhe or familiar spirit and a banshee (Note: a druidess in Lady Gregory.) and she transports him by magic to the top of Balor's tower, where he seduces Ethnea. (Note: Presumably Mac Kineely=Cian (or Biróg) knew that Balor was fated to be killed by his grandchild.) (Note: Also, Cian is sneaked into the tower disguised as a woman, wearing female attire, because only female attendants are allowed near the daughter.)

In time, Ethnea gives birth to triplets, which Balor gathers up in a sheet and sends out to be drowned in a whirlpool. The messenger drowns two of the babies but unwittingly drops one child (unnamed in the original telling, but Lugh in Lady Gregory's version) into the harbour, where he is rescued by Biróg. She takes the baby to his father, who gives him to his brother, Gavida the smith, in fosterage. (Note: This is changed by Lady Gregory to fosterage under "Taillte, daughter of the King of the Great Plain", which conforms with adoption by Tailtiu as given in the LGE. Arthur C. L. Brown also favors "foster-mother" here, and footnotes that the banshee Birog who "gave the boy to his father's brother, Gavida the Smith" was still "a kind of foster-mother". In Larminie's version, the child, named Dul Dauna, is fostered by "Mananaun".)

As noted, Cían's offspring is not explicitly called "Lugh" in O'Donovan's version of the cow folktale, but the boy is called "Dul Dauna" in Larminie's collected folktale. The name Dul Dauna taken at face value is glossed as "the blind stubborn" (< dall) by Larminie and "black surly one" (< doilbh?) by Westropp, but is also thought to be a corruption of Lugh's byname Ildanach "master of all knowledge". However, the boy is called by something close to the god's name, namely Lui Lavada (Lui Longhand) in two tales collected by Curtin. (Note: It is possible Lugh as a boy did not receive a name, if William John Gruffydd hypothesis is correct. He reconstructs an original Irish tale in which Balor curses his grandson with three geasa including not receiving a name except by him. This is just what happens to Lleu Llaw Gyffes in Mabinogi tale of Math (cf. §Welsh counterpart below. Gruffydd (1928), pp. 102–106, apud Loomis (1929), p. 140)

=== Synopsis of Bentley's version ===
The synopsis of the tale as printed by Richard Bentley is as follows:

Ballar is a Danish giant and the most ancient king of Torry Island. He possesses a third eye in the back of his head that is concealed with a curatin. Ballar possesses one beautiful daughter, and a prophecy is made that unless he is killed by his daughter's son, he will live forever. He finds Torry Island and deems it suitably removed, and there he builds a castle for himself and a prison for his daughter, which is guarded by twelve virgins.

Ballar's nearest neighbors are Gabshegonal and Kien Mac Caunthca. Gabshegonal possesses a famous white heifer Glassdhablecana that "is a dairy unto herself," while Kien Mac Caunthca has two sons. Ballar demands tributes from his vassals on the mainland, including Glassdhablecana, but Gabshegonal refuses to give her over. Therefore Ballar intends to obtain her "by fraud what force could not effect," and sends his servants Mool and Mullock to retrieve her. Gabshegonal, discerning Ballar's intentions, calls the sons of Kien to watch over his cow in exchange for swords that he will make for them. When it is the turn of the younger of Kien's sons to watch the cow, he is negligent in his duties, and Mool and Mullock soon kidnap Glassdhablecana. Enraged, the smith holds Kien's oldest son hostage and threatens to behead him if the younger does not return Glassdhablecana.

Kien's younger son runs off in despair and meets a red-bearded dwarf, who offers to help. They climb a nearby mountain, and the boy stands on the dwarf's hand and is carried invisibly on the wind to Ballar's castle. There, the young Mac Caunthca meets the princess and spends a night with her. The next morning, the red dwarf returns the boy to the mainland. Nine months later the red dwarf takes Kien's younger son back to Ballar's castle, where he finds he is the father of 13 children - one son by the princess and one by each of the virgin guards. The new father gathers the children into sheets and carries them into a currach, which he sails toward the mainland. Along the way, a storm arises, and all but his son by the princess are lost at sea. When father and son return to shore, the red dwarf offers to raise the babe for the first seven years as his fosterling, then return to his father for the next seven, and again raise the boy for his final seven years. Kien's son agrees.

When the boy grows to manhood, he meets his grandfather Ballar at a wedding feast; there he insults Ballar and divulges their relationship. Thereupon Ballar pursues his grandson, and the boy pierces Ballar through the eye with hot steel from Gabshegonal's forge. Finally, the story ends with the happy marriage of the princess and Kien's young son and the release of Kien's older son from the hostage of Gabshegonal.

The people of Torry Island believe themselves to be descendants of the Danish princess and her son who slew Ballar.

=== Cian's death by Balor ===
In Donovan's version, Mac Kineely=Cian does not succeed in regaining the magic cow in his lifetime (or rather, he himself is killed before the destruction of Balor, which was the prophesied prerequisite for the regaining of the cow). It is told that Mac Kineely's head was struck off by Balor, and a piece of white stone was permanently tainted with the blood, running in the form of red veins. The supposed veined marble was propped on a pillar and became a local monument known as "Clogh-an-Neely" (reconstructed Irish: cloch Chinnfhaolaidh).

== Welsh counterpart ==
Some scholars argue that the Welsh deity Gwydion is the counterpart to Cian/Cían.

The story of the birth of Lleu Llaw Gyffes, the Welsh incarnation of Lugh, occurs in the Mabinogi tale of Math fab Mathonwy (branch). Although the tale does not explicitly identify Lleu's father, it has been asserted that Lleu was Gwydion's "incestuously begotten son", thus making Gwydion the Welsh equivalent of Cian/Cían.

The emphasis of study is the parallel between Gwydion and Cian=MacKineely of Irish folktale (rather than Cian of the mythological tracts or OCT) in the case of Welsh scholar John Rhys has pursued.

One parallel is that the newborn are unwanted by their forebears and condemned to die, but survive. And the paralleling theme is recognizable as the ubiquitous one of "King and His Prophesied Death" according to other scholars. And certainly the prophecy of death by the hand of one's child or grandchild occurs in the Cian-Balor folktale as well as the Greek stories of Perseus and Oedipus Rex. (Note: Gruffydd (1928), pp. 8, 366, apud Loomis (1929), p. 140)
