= Seosamh Laoide =

Irish language scholar and activist

Seosamh Laoide (English: Joseph H. Lloyd, 1865–1939), known as "Mac Tíre na Páirce" ("Wolf of the Park"), was an Irish language scholar and activist during the period 1893 – 1915. Today he is perhaps best remembered for his work on Irish placenames, particularly on the placenames of Dublin, with his proposals often becoming the established Irish versions for the city's streets following the establishment of the Irish state in December 1922.

== Life ==
Laoide was born at 7 Annaville Lower in Ranelagh, Dublin on 24 May 1865. He was the eldest son of an Irish Protestant couple, Joseph Henry Lloyd (PhD) and Anne Phair. His father was a linguist, member of the Irish Language Preservation Society/Chumann Buanchoimeádta na Gaeilge, and friend of the Irish scholar P.W. Joyce.

Laoide was awarded sizarships to attend Trinity College, Dublin in 1890 where he studied under Professor James Goodman (1828-1896) who awarded him a prize each year until 1894 when he left without completing his degree.

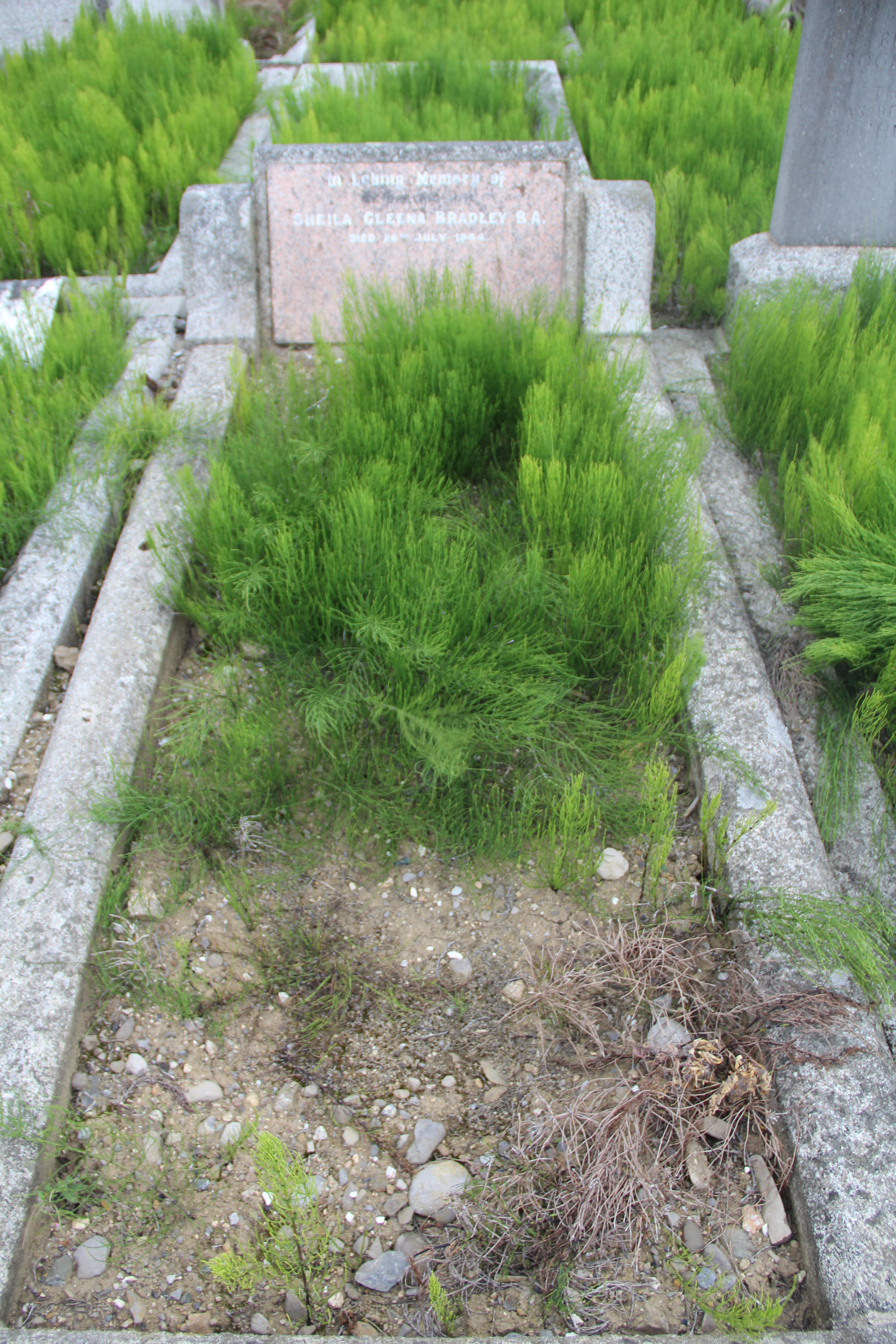
Grave of Irish scholar Seosamh Laoide (1865-1939), Deansgrange Cemetery, Co. Dublin.

In the autumn of 1893 Laoide is recorded as joint treasurer of Conradh na Gaeilge, which had been founded on 31 July of that year. Around the same time he visited Peadar Ó Laoghaire to encourage him to begin writing. In these years Laoide developed an extensive knowledge of Irish dialects and became active in the then mass movement that was Conradh na Gaeilge, most especially in publishing books and articles in Irish. When Scoil Ard-Léinn na hÉireann was established by Kuno Meyer in 1903, Laoide was one of the first students and became a prolific publisher of books in Irish on folklore, dialects, placenames and the like.

Sometime after 1915 Laoide left Ireland and became a civil servant in London. While there he suffered mental health issues and was hospitalised for some time. He also married a wealthy Irish woman named Elizabeth Sharp; they returned to Ireland in 1920, where they settled in Stillorgan, Co. Dublin. In 1933 they moved to Dún Laoghaire. Laoide died on 21 September 1939 and, following a small private ceremony, was buried in Deansgrange, Co. Dublin.

Under the heading 'Distinguished Gael laid to rest" The Irish Press of Monday 25 September 1939 recorded his death thus:'The funeral of Mr. Joseph Henry Lloyd (Seosamh Laoide), Royal Terrace West, Dún Laoghaire, took place to Deansgrange Cemetery, on Saturday morning, where the Service was conducted by the Rev. A. W. R. Camier, M.A., Christ Church.... Mr. Lloyd, who was a distinguished Irish scholar, was, with the President Dr. Douglas Hyde, one of the founders of the Gaelic League.... The late Mr. Lloyd was a member of the Head Office staff of the Great Southern Railway Company, from which he retired. The chief mourners were: Mr. W J. Lloyd, Belfield, Raheny (brother); Mra. Lloyd (sister-in-law). - Also present: Mr. and Mrs . John Montgomery, "An Seabhac " (Pádraig Ó Siochfhradha), and Séamus Ó Casaide, B.L." Laoide deposited papers with the Royal Irish Academy in 1933, and the executor of his estate, his brother W.J. Lloyd, donated them to the RIA in 1950.

According to the records of Deansgrange cemetery, at the time of his death Seosamh lived at No. 1 Royal Terrace in Dún Laoghaire. He was buried with his wife, who was recorded as Elizabeth Lloyd, who had died on 14 February 1936. A third person, Sheila Bradley, who died on 26 July 1944 is buried in the same grave. Only the name of this last person is on Seosamh Laoide's grave in 2016. Tom Casement, brother of Roger Casement, who died in March 1939 is buried in the grave immediately next to his.

== Select publications ==
As author:

- Sgéalaidhe Fearnmhuighe (1901), Leabhar geograiphe, [g.d],
- Seachrán Chairn tSiadhail, 1904,
- Sgéalaidhe Óirghiall .i. Sgéalaidhe Fearnmhuighe agus tuilleadh leis, 1905
- Sgéal Chúchulainn ag Cuan Carm (1906)
- Measgán Musgraighe (1907)
- Cruach Chonaill (1909)
- Trí Torpáin (1911)
- Duanaire na Midhe (1914)
- Fian-Laoithe (1916)
- Tonn Tóime (1915)
- Réalta de spéir (1915)
- Alasdair Mac Colla (1914)
- Brisleach mhór Mhaighe Muirtheimhne (1915)

As editor:

- Post-seanchas, 1905 agus 1911
- Dearg-ruathar Chonaill Chearnaigh, 1907
- Teacht agus imtheacht an ghiolla dheacair agus toruigheacht Chonáin agus a chuideachtan (i gcomhar le Seán Ó hÓgáin ), 1905
- Eachtra mhacaoimh an Iolair Mhic Ríogh na Sorcha le Brian Ó Corcráin (i gcomhar le Iorard de Teiltiún), 1912.
