= Lugh =

Irish god of skills and the arts

- God of Justice, war, kingship, craftsmen, skills, trade and harvests.
- Member of the Tuatha Dé Danann
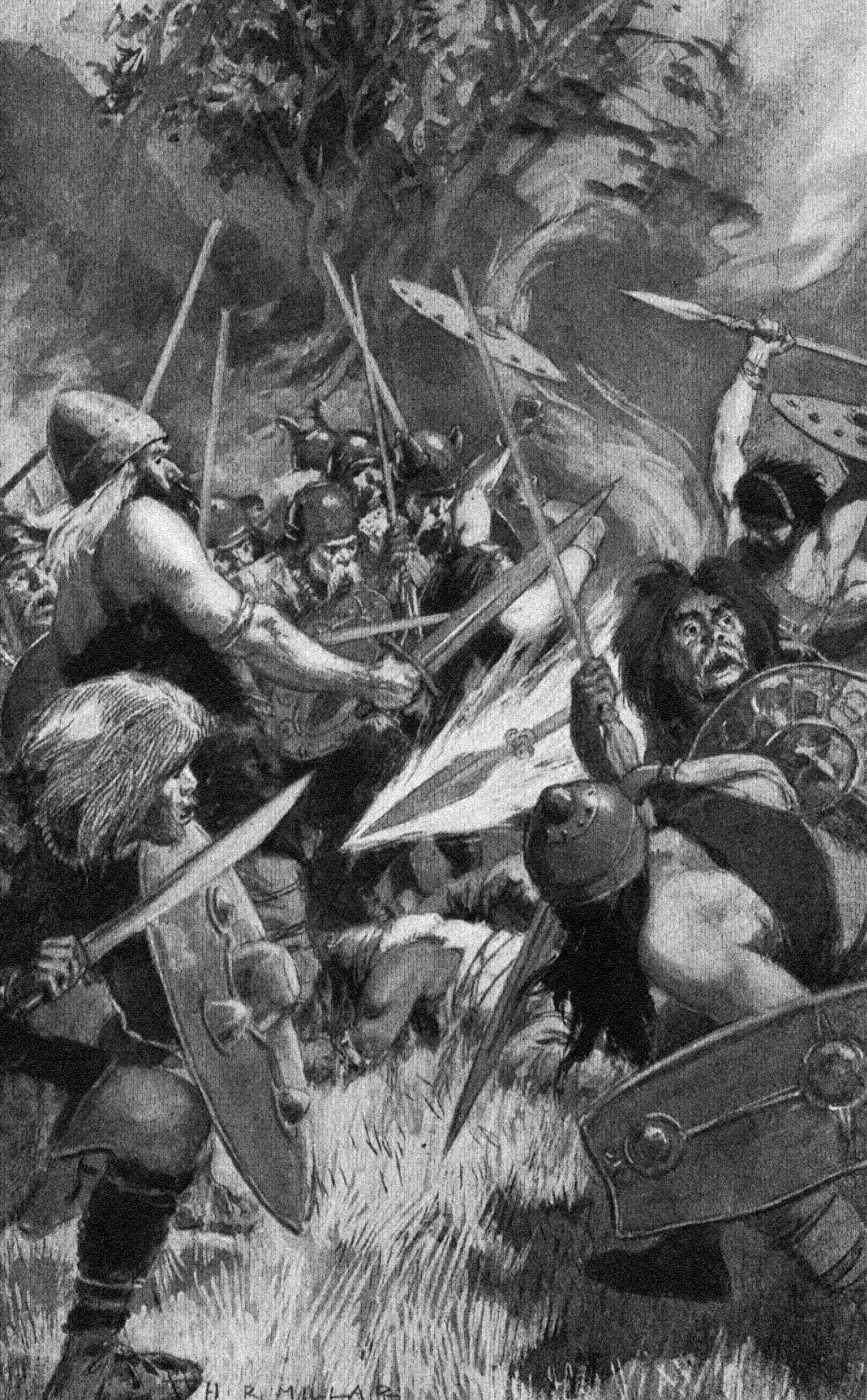
- Illustration of Lugh's magical spear by H. R. Millar
- Other names: Lug, Lugus.
- Abodes: Tara
- Weapons: Gae Assail; Fragarach; Tathlum
- Animals: Failinis; Enbarr
- Festivals: Lughnasadh; Aonach Tailteann

Genealogy
- Parents: Cian; Ethniu
- Consorts: Buí; Nás; Deichtine (mortal)
- Children: Ibic; Ebliu; Cúchulainn (mortal)

Equivalents
- Roman: Mercury

Lugh or Lug (Old Irish: [l̪uɣ]; modern Irish: Lú [l̪ˠuː]) is a figure in Irish mythology. A member of the Tuatha Dé Danann, a group of supernatural beings, Lugh is portrayed as a warrior, a king, a master craftsman and a saviour. He is associated with skill and mastery in multiple disciplines, including the arts. Lugh also has associations with oaths, truth, and the law, and therefore with rightful kingship. He is also associated with intelligence. Lugh is linked with the harvest festival of Lughnasadh, which bears his name. His most common epithets are Lámfada (Modern Irish: Lámhfhada [ˈl̪ˠaːw ad̪ˠə]; "long hand" or "long arm", possibly for his skill with a spear or his ability as a ruler) and Samildánach (Modern Irish: Samhaildánach [ˈsˠawəlʲ d̪ˠaːnˠəx]; "equally skilled in many arts"). This has sometimes been anglicised as "Lew of the Long Hand".

In mythology, Lugh is the son of Cian and Ethniu (or Ethliu). He is the maternal grandson of the Fomorian tyrant Balor, whom Lugh kills in the Battle of Mag Tuired. Lugh's son is the hero Cú Chulainn, who is believed to be an incarnation of Lugh.

Lugh has several magical possessions. He wields an unstoppable fiery spear and a sling stone and owns a hound named Failinis. He is said to have invented fidchell, ball games, and horse racing.

He is the Irish manifestation of the pan-Celtic god Lugus, and his Welsh counterpart is Lleu Llaw Gyffes. The interpretatio romana has Lug correspond to the Romans god Mercury.

== Name ==
=== Etymology ===
The meaning of Lugh's name is still a matter of debate. Some scholars propose that it derives from a suggested Proto-Indo-European root *(h₂)lewgʰ- meaning "to bind by oath" (compare Old Irish luige and Welsh llw, both meaning "oath, vow, act of swearing" and derived from a suffixed Proto-Celtic form, *lugiyo-, "oath"), suggesting that he was originally a god of oaths and sworn contracts. When Balor meets Lugh in the Second Battle of Moytura he calls Lugh a "babbler".

In the past his name was generally believed to come from another suggested Proto-Indo-European root *leuk-, "flashing light", and since the Victorian era he has often been considered a sun god, similar to the Greco-Roman Apollo. However, the figure of Lugh in Irish mythology and literature seems to be a better match with a romanized god identified with Mercury, described by Julius Caesar in his De Bello Gallico. There are serious phonological issues with deriving the name from *leuk-, notably that Proto-Indo-European *-k- never produced Proto-Celtic *-g-; for this reason, most modern specialists in Celtic languages no longer accept this etymology.

=== Epithets ===
- Lámfada ([ˈl̪ˠaːβˠ ad̪ˠə] ("long hand") – possibly for his skill with a spear or his ability as a ruler
- Samildánach ("equally skilled in all the arts")
- Lonnansclech ("fierce / strong, combative")
- Lonnbéimnech ("fierce striker")
- Macnia ("young warrior / hero")
- Conmac ("dog-youth / lad of hounds")

== Description ==
Lugh is typically described as a youthful warrior. In the brief narrative Baile in Scáil, Lugh is described as being very large and very beautiful and a spear-wielding horseman.

When he appears before the wounded Cú Chulainn in the Táin Bó Cúalnge he is described as follows:

A man fair and tall, with a great head of curly yellow hair. He has a green mantle wrapped about him and a brooch of white silver in the mantle over his breast. Next to his white skin, he wears a tunic of royal satin with red-gold insertion reaching to his knees. He carries a black shield with a hard boss of white-bronze. In his hand a five-pointed spear and next to it a forked javelin. Wonderful is the play and sport and diversion that he makes (with these weapons). But none accosts him and he accosts none as if no one could see him.

Elsewhere Lugh is described as a tall young man with bright red cheeks, white sides, a bronze-coloured face and blood-coloured hair.

In The Fate of the Children of Turenn Lugh's appearance is compared to the sun on several occasions. He is described by Bres as follows:

Then arose Breas, the son of Balar, and he said: "It is a wonder to me", said he, "that the sun should rise in the west today, and in the east every other day". "It were better that it were so", said the Druids. "What else is it?" said he. "The radiance of the face of Lugh of the Long Arms", said they.

Elsewhere in the same passage, the following remark is made:

... they were not long there when they saw an army and a goodly host coming towards them from the East, and in the vanguard there was one young man high in authority over all; and like to the setting sun was the radiance of his face and forehead, and they were unable to gaze upon his countenance on account of its splendour. And this is who it was - Lugh Lamhfhada Loinnbheimionach ... from the Land of Promise ... and when the Cathbarr (Manannan's helmet) was let off of him the appearance of his face and forehead was as brilliant as the sun on a dry summer's day.

== Mythology ==
=== Birth ===
Lugh's father is Cian of the Tuatha Dé Danann, and his mother is Ethniu (Eithne in Modern Irish), daughter of Balor of the Fomorians. In Cath Maige Tuired their union is a dynastic marriage following an alliance between the Tuatha Dé and the Fomorians. In the Lebor Gabála Érenn, Cian gives the boy to Tailtiu, queen of the Fir Bolg, in fosterage. In the Dindsenchas, Lugh, the foster-son of Tailtiu, is described as the "son of the Dumb Champion". In the poem Baile Suthain Sith Eamhna Lugh is called "descendant of the poet."

A folktale told to John O'Donovan by Shane O'Dugan of Tory Island in 1835 recounts the birth of a grandson of Balor who grows up to kill his grandfather. The grandson is unnamed, his father is called Mac Cinnfhaelaidh and the manner of his killing of Balor is different, but it has been taken as a version of the birth of Lugh, and was adapted as such by Lady Gregory. In this tale, Balor hears a druid's prophecy that he will be killed by his own grandson. To prevent this he imprisons his only daughter in the Tór Mór (great tower) of Tory Island. She is cared for by twelve women, who are to prevent her from ever meeting or even learning of the existence of men.

On the mainland, Mac Cinnfhaelaidh owns a magic cow who gives such abundant milk that everyone, including Balor, wants to possess her. While the cow is in the care of Mac Cinnfhaelaidh's brother Mac Samthainn, Balor appears in the form of a little red-haired boy and tricks him into giving him the cow. Looking for revenge, Mac Cinnfhaelaidh calls on a leanan sídhe (fairy woman) called Biróg, who transports him by magic to the top of Balor's tower, where he seduces Ethniu. In time, she gives birth to triplets, which Balor gathers up in a sheet and sends to drown in a whirlpool. The messenger drowns two of the babies but unwittingly drops one child into the harbour, where he is rescued by Biróg. She takes him to his father, who gives him to his brother, Gavida the smith, in fosterage.

There may be further triplism associated with his birth. His father in the folktale is one of a triad of brothers, Mac Cinnfhaelaidh, Gavida, and Mac Samthainn, whereas in the Lebor Gabála, his father Cian is mentioned alongside his brothers Cú and Cethen. (Note: e.g. According to the Rennes Dindsenchas §14, Cú killed Cethen, and there once was a well-known phrase that "Thou hast acted for me Cú and Cethen".) Two characters called Lugaid, a popular medieval Irish name thought to derive from Lugh, have three fathers: Lugaid Riab nDerg (Lugaid of the Red Stripes) was the son of the three Findemna or fair triplets, and Lugaid mac Con Roí was also known as mac Trí Con, "son of three hounds". In Ireland's other great "sequestered maiden" story, the tragedy of Deirdre, the king's intended is carried off by three brothers, who are hunters with hounds. The canine imagery continues with Cian's brother Cú ("hound"), another Lugaid, Lugaid Mac Con (son of a hound), and Lugh's son Cúchulainn ("Culann's Hound"). A fourth Lugaid was Lugaid Loígde, a legendary King of Tara and ancestor of (or inspiration for) Lugaid Mac Con.

=== Lugh joins the Tuatha Dé Danann ===
As a young man Lugh travels to Tara to join the court of King Nuada of the Tuatha Dé Danann. The doorkeeper will not let him in unless he has a skill he can use to serve the king. He offers his services as a wright, a smith, a champion, a swordsman, a harpist, a hero, a poet, a historian, a sorcerer, and a craftsman, but each time is rejected as the Tuatha Dé Danann already have someone with that skill. When Lugh asks if they have anyone with all those skills simultaneously, the doorkeeper has to admit defeat, and Lugh joins the court and is appointed Chief Ollam of Ireland. He wins a flagstone-throwing contest against Ogma, the champion, and entertains the court with his harp. The Tuatha Dé Danann are, at that time, oppressed by the Fomorians, and Lugh is amazed at how meekly they accept their oppression. Nuada wonders if this young man could lead them to freedom. Lugh is given command over the Tuatha Dé Danann, and he begins making preparations for war.

=== Sons of Tuireann ===
Tuireann and Cian, Lugh's father, are old enemies, and one day his sons, Brian, Iuchar, and Iucharba spot Cian in the distance and decide to kill him. They find him hiding in the form of a pig, but Cian tricked the brothers into allowing him to transform back into a man before they killed him, giving Lugh the legal right to claim compensation for a father rather than just a pig. When they try to bury him, the ground spits his body back twice before keeping him down, and eventually confesses that it is a grave to Lugh.

Lugh holds a feast and invites the brothers, and during it he asks them what they would demand as compensation for the murder of their father. They reply that death would be the only just demand, and Lugh agrees. He then accuses them of the murder of his father, Cian, and sets them on a series of seemingly impossible quests. The brothers go on an adventure and achieve them all except the last one, which will surely kill them. Despite Tuireann's pleas, Lugh demands that they proceed and, when they are all fatally wounded, he denies them the use of one of the items they have retrieved, a magic pigskin which heals all wounds. They die of their wounds and Tuireann dies of grief over their bodies.

=== Battle of Magh Tuireadh ===
Using the magic artefacts the sons of Tuireann have gathered, Lugh leads the Tuatha Dé Danann in the Second Battle of Mag Tuireadh against the Fomorians. Prior to the battle, Lugh asked each man and woman in his army what art he or she would bring to the fray. He then addressed his army in speech, which elevated each warrior's spirit to that of a king or lord. Nuada is killed in the battle by Balor. Lugh faces Balor, who opens his terrible, poisonous eye that kills all it looks upon, but Lugh shoots a sling -stone that drives his eye out the back of his head, killing Balor and wreaking havoc on the Fomorian army behind.

After the victory Lugh finds Bres, the half-Fomorian former king of the Tuatha Dé Danann, alone and unprotected on the battlefield, and Bres begs for his life. If he is spared, he promises, he will ensure that the cows of Ireland always give milk. The Tuatha Dé Danann refuse the offer. He then promises four harvests a year, but the Tuatha Dé Danann say one harvest a year suits them. But Lugh spares his life on the condition that he teach the Tuatha Dé Danann how and when to plough, sow, and reap.

=== Later life and death ===
Lugh instituted an event similar to the Olympic Games called the Assembly of Talti which finished on Lughnasadh (1 August) in memory of his foster mother, Tailtiu, at the town that bears her name, now Teltown, County Meath. He likewise instituted Lughnasadh fairs in the areas of Carman and Naas in honour of Carman and Nás, the eponymous tutelary goddesses of these two regions. Horse races and displays of martial arts were important activities at all three fairs. Lughnasadh is a celebration of Lugh's triumph over the spirits of the Otherworld who had tried to keep the harvest for themselves. It survived long into Christian times and is still celebrated under a variety of names. Lúnasa is now the Irish name for the month of August.

According to a poem of the dindsenchas, Lugh was responsible for the death of Bres. He made 300 wooden cows and filled them with a bitter, poisonous red liquid which was then "milked" into pails and offered to Bres to drink. Bres, who was under an obligation not to refuse hospitality, drank it down without flinching, and it killed him.

Lugh is said to have invented the board game fidchell.

One of his wives, Buach, had an affair with Cermait, son of the Dagda. Lugh killed him in revenge, but Cermait's sons, Mac Cuill, Mac Cecht, and Mac Gréine, killed Lugh in return, spearing him through the foot then drowning him in Loch Lugborta in County Westmeath He had ruled for forty years. Cermait was later revived by his father, the Dagda, who used the smooth or healing end of his staff to bring Cermait back to life.

=== In other cycles and traditions ===
- In the Ulster Cycle he fathered Cúchulainn with the mortal maiden Deichtine. When Cúchulainn lay wounded after a gruelling series of combats during the Táin Bó Cuailnge (Cattle Raid of Cooley), Lugh appeared and healed his wounds over a period of three days.
- In Baile in Scáil (The Phantom's Trance), a story of the Historical Cycle, Lugh appeared in a vision to Conn of the Hundred Battles. Enthroned on a daïs, he directed a beautiful woman called the Sovereignty of Ireland to serve Conn a portion of meat and a cup of red ale, ritually confirming his right to rule and the dynasty that would follow him.
- In the Fenian Cycle the dwarf harper Cnú Deireóil claimed to be Lugh's son.
- The Luigne, a people who inhabited Counties Meath and Sligo, claimed descent from him.
- Ainle is listed as the son of Lug Longhand (here called "Leo lam-fota") and is killed by Curnan the Blacklegged in the Rennes Dinsenchas. Ainle, whose name means "champion" is described as being renowned and glorious, but in the same poetic verse is also described as being a weakling with no grip in battle.
- Lugh appears in folklore as a trickster, and in County Mayo thunderstorms were referred to as battles between Lugh and Balor, which leads some to speculate that he was a storm god.

== Family ==
Lugh is given the matriname mac Ethlenn or mac Ethnenn ("son of Ethliu or Ethniu", his mother) and the patriname mac Cein ("son of Cian", his father). He is the maternal grandson of the Fomorian tyrant Balor, whom Lugh kills in the Battle of Mag Tuired. Lugh's son is the hero Cú Chulainn, who is believed to be an incarnation of Lugh.

He had several wives, including Buí (AKA Buach or Bua "Victory") and Nás, daughters of Ruadri Ruad, king of Britain. Buí lived and was buried at Knowth (Cnogba). Nás was buried at Naas, County Kildare, which is said to be named after her. Lugh had a son, Ibic "of the horses", by Nás. It is said that Nás dies with the noise of combat. Therefore it is difficult to know where she dies. Lugh's daughter or sister was Ebliu, who married Fintan. By the mortal Deichtine, Lugh was the father to the hero Cú Chulainn.

== Possessions ==
Lugh possessed a number of magical items, retrieved by the sons of Tuirill Piccreo in Middle Irish redactions of the Lebor Gabála. Not all the items are listed here. The late narrative Fate of the Children of Tuireann not only gives a list of items gathered for Lugh, but also endows him with such gifts from the sea god Manannán as the sword Fragarach, the horse Enbarr (Aonbarr), the boat Scuabtuinne / Sguaba Tuinne ("Wave-Sweeper"), his armour and helmet.

=== Lugh's spear ===
Lugh's spear (sleg), according to the text of The Four Jewels of the Tuatha Dé Danann, was said to be impossible to overcome, taken to Ireland from Gorias (or Findias). (Note: However, Vernam Hull edited a "Four Jewels" text which swaps weapons between owners in the attached verse portion, making it Lug's sword that came from Gorias. Something similar happens in the verse invoked in Geoffrey Keating's History of Ireland, and in Comyn ed. tr., Lugh's sword is from Gorias, Lugh's spear is from Findias (Lugh becomes owner of both).)

Lugh obtained the Spear of Assal (Irish: Gae Assail) as fine (éric) imposed on the children of Tuirill Piccreo (or Biccreo), according to the short account in Lebor Gabála Érenn which adds that the incantation "Ibar (Yew)" made the cast always hit its mark, and "Athibar (Re-Yew)" caused the spear to return.

In a full narrative version called [A]oidhe Chloinne Tuireann (The Fate of the Children of Tuireann), from copies no earlier than the 17th century, Lugh demands the spear named Ar-éadbair or Areadbhair (Early Modern Irish: Aꞃéadḃaiꞃ) which belonged to Pisear, king of Persia. Areadbhair's tip had to be kept immersed in a pot of water to keep it from igniting, a property similar to the Lúin of Celtchar. This spear is also called "Slaughterer" in translation.

There is yet another name that Lugh's spear goes by: "A [yew] tree, the finest of the wood" (Early Modern Irish: eó bo háille d'ḟíoḋḃaiḃ), occurring in an inserted verse within The Fate of the Children of Tuireann. "The famous yew of the wood" (ibar alai fhidbaidha) is also the name that Lugh's spear is given in a tract which alleges that it, the Lúin of Celtchar and the spear Crimall that blinded Cormac Mac Airt were one and the same weapon (tract in TCD MS 1336 (H 3. 17), col. 723, discussed in the Lúin page).

Lugh's projectile weapon, whether a dart or missile, was envisioned to be symbolic of lightning-weapon.

Lugh's sling rod, named "Lugh's Chain", was the rainbow and the Milky Way, according to popular writer Charles Squire. Squire adds that Lugh's spear which needed no wielding was alive and thirsted so for blood that only by steeping its head in a sleeping-draught of pounded fresh poppy leaves could it be kept at rest. When a battle was near, it was drawn out; then it roared and struggled against its thongs, fire flashed from it, and it tore through the ranks of the enemy once slipped from the leash, never tired of slaying.

=== Sling-stone ===
According to the brief accounts in the Lebor Gabála Érenn, Lugh used the "sling-stone" (cloich tabaill) to slay his grandfather, Balor the Strong-Smiter in the Battle of Magh Tuired. The narrative Cath Maige Tured, preserved in a unique 16th-century copy, words it slightly different saying that Lugh used the sling-stone (Note: Old Irish: liic talma § 133, i.e. lía "stone" of the 'tailm "sling".) to destroy the evil eye of Balor of the Piercing Eye (Bolur Birugderc).

The ammunition that Lugh used was not just a stone, but a tathlum according to a certain poem in Egerton MS. 1782 (olim W. Monck Mason MS.), the first quatrain of which is as follows:

Táthlum tromm thenntide tenn
robūi ag Tūath Dé Danann,
hī robriss súil Balair búain
tall ar toghail in tromshlúaigh

— Meyer (1905) ed.
Translation:

A tathlum, heavy, fiery, firm,
Which the Tuatha Dé Danann had with them,
It was that broke the fierce Balor's eye,
Of old, in the battle of the great armies.

— O'Curry (1873) tr.

The poem goes on to describe the composition of this tathlum, as being formed from the blood collected from toads, bears, lions, vipers and the neck-base of Osmuinn, (Note: O'Curry italicizes it as a proper name. Meyer edits the text as ós muin, but Edward J. Gwynn sheds no light as to meaning since he skips over this ingredient while listing up all the other components derived from animals.) mixed with the sands of the Armorian Sea and the Red Sea.

=== Fragarach ===
Lugh is also seen girt with the Freagarthach (better known as Fragarach), the sword of Manannán, in the assembly of the Tuatha Dé Danann in the Fate of the Children of Tuireann.

=== Lugh's horse and magic boat ===
Lugh had a horse named Aenbharr which could fare over both land and sea. Like much of his equipment, it was furnished to him by the sea god Manannán mac Lir. When the Children of Tuireann asked to borrow this horse, Lugh begrudged them, saying it would not be proper to make a loan of a loan. Consequently, Lugh was unable to refuse their request to use Lugh's currach (coracle) or boat, the "Wave-Sweeper" (Irish: Sguaba Tuinne).

In the Lebor Gabála, Gainne and Rea were the names of the pair of horses belonging to the king of the isle of Sicily [on the (Tyrrhene sea)], which Lug demanded as éraic from the sons of Tuirill Briccreo.

=== Lugh's hound ===
Failinis was the name of the whelp of the King of Ioruaidhe that Lugh demanded as éiric (a forfeit) in the Oidhead Chloinne Tuireann. This concurs with the name of the hound mentioned in an "Ossianic Ballad", sometimes referred to by its opening line "Dám Thrír Táncatair Ille (They came here as a band of three)". In the ballad, the hound is called Ṡalinnis (Shalinnis) or Failinis (in the Lismore text), and belonged to a threesome from Iruaide whom the Fianna encounter. It is described as "the ancient greyhound... that had been with Lugh of the Mantles, / Given him by the sons of Tuireann Bicreann" (Note: The four verses excerpted by O'Curry do not include the hound's name, but the text actually does mention Failinis, the name of the hound in the full texts edited by Stokes and by Stern.)

== Comparative mythology ==
Lugh has been connected with the pan-Celtic god Lugus. Through Lugus, John Rhys has argued Lugh is cognate with the Welsh mythological figure Lleu Llaw Gyffes. Sometimes Lugh is interpreted as a storm god and, less often today, as a sun god, thus equating Lugh with the Roman gods Jupiter or Sol, respectively. Others have noted a similarity in Lugh's slaying of Balor to the slaying of Baldr by Loki. Lugh's mastery of all arts led Marie Henri d'Arbois de Jubainville to link Lugus with the unnamed Gaulish god whom Julius Caesar identifies with Mercury and describes as the "inventor of all the arts".

Saint Molaga has been theorized to be a Christian continuation of the god Lugh.

== Toponymy ==
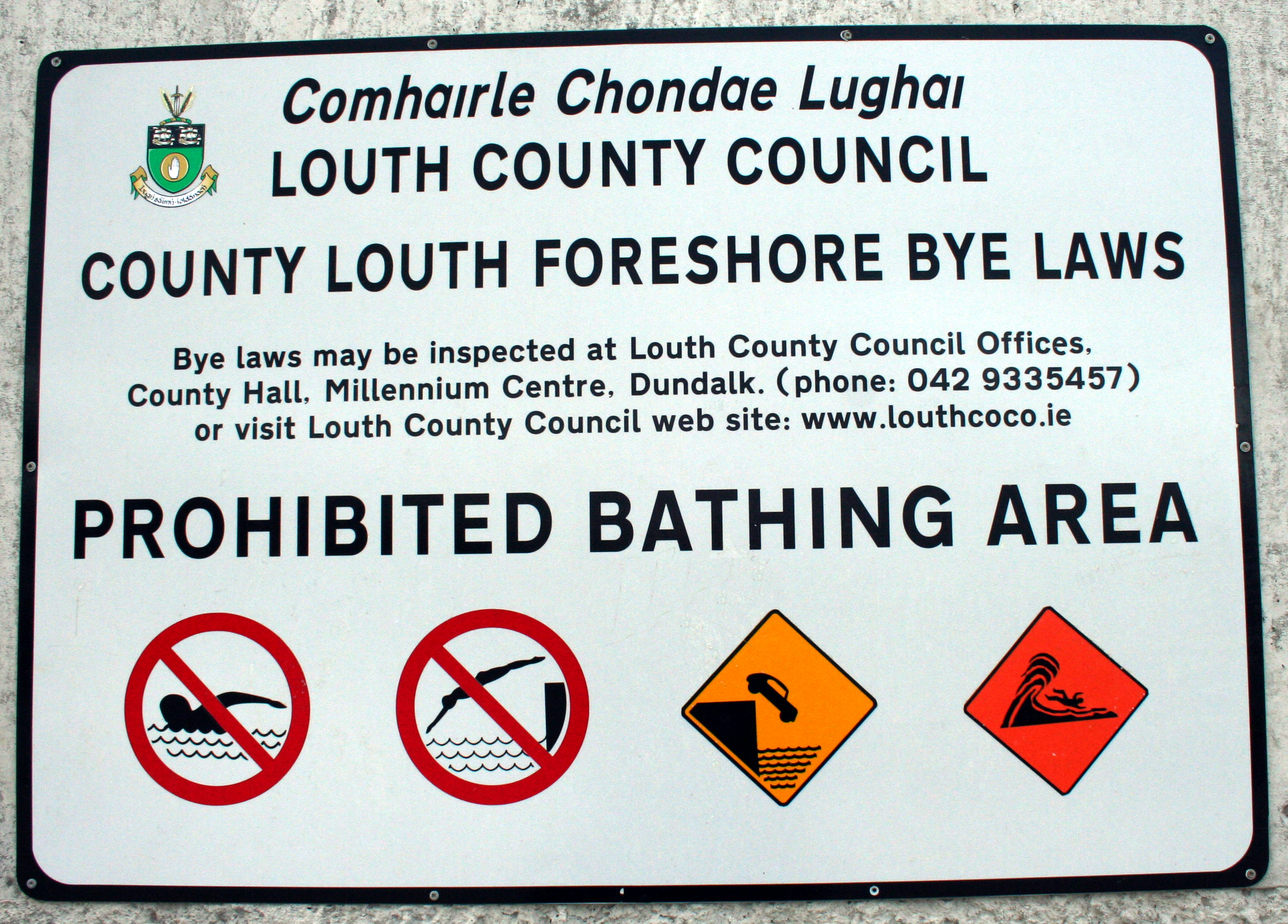
Sign in County Louth with the variant genitive form Lughai for the county, which makes the connection to Lugh more explicit.

County Louth in northeastern Ireland is named after the village of Louth, which is named in turn for the god Lugh. Historically, the place name has had various spellings; "Lugmad", "Lughmhaigh", and "Lughmhadh" (see Historic Names List, for full listing). Lú is the modern simplified spelling. Other places named for Lugh include the cairn at Seelewey (Suidhe Lughaidh, or Lug's Seat), Dunlewey, and Rath-Lugaidh in Carney, Sligo. Seelewey was located in Moyturra Chonlainn and, according to local folklore, was a place where giants used to gather in olden days.

The city of Lyon, France was founded as Colonia Copia Felix Munatia in 43 BC. By the end of the first century AD it was known as "Lugdunum", a Latinized variant of the ancient Gaulish name *Lugudunon, meaning "Fortress of Lugh".

The name of the English town of Louth, Lincolnshire is unrelated; it derives from the River Lud ('loud river').

== See also ==
- Irish mythology in popular culture: Lugh
- Perseus - His birth is similar to that of Lugh's
- Táin Bó Flidhais
- Triglav (mythology)
- Triple deity
- Irish clans

== Explanatory notes ==
=== References ===
Citations

Bibliography

(Baile In Scáil, The Phantom's Trance)

- Dillon, Myles Dillon, ed. (1946), "Baile in Scáil: The Phantom's Frenzy", The Cycle of the Kings, reedited by Mary Jones, Oxford: OUP, pp. 11–14, ISBN 9781851821785, archived from the original on 16 September 2024 text via Celtic Literature Collective, accessed 5 August 2019

(Cath Maige Tuired)

- Gray, Elizabeth A., ed. (1982). Cath Maige Tuired: The Second battle of Mag Tuired. Drucker. Archived from the original on 16 September 2024. (Full text here via CELT.) text via sacred-texts.com
- Stokes, Whitley, ed. (1891), "The Second Battle of Moytura", Revue celtique, 12: 52–130, 306–308, archived from the original on 16 September 2024, text via Internet Archive, text Archived 25 April 2017 at the Wayback Machine via CELT

(Compert Con Culainn)

- Compert Con Culainn (Recension I), ed. A.G. van Hamel (1933). Compert Con Culainn and Other Stories. Mediaeval and Modern Irish Series 3. Dublin: DIAS. pp. 1–8.

(LGE)

- Macalister, R.A.S., ed. (1941), "Section VII: Invasion of the Tuatha De Danann", Lebor gabála Érenn, Part IV

(Metrical Dindshenchas)

- Gwynn, Edward J. (1913), The Metrical Dindshenchas: Part 3, Todd Lecture Series X, Hodges, Figgis & Co., archived from the original on 16 September 2024, e-text via CELT
- —— (1924), The Metrical Dindshenchas: Part 4, Todd Lecture Series X, Hodges, Figgis & Co., snippet Archived 16 September 2024 at the Wayback Machine via Google, e-text via CELT

(Oidheadh Chlainne Tuireann, The Death of the Children of Tuireann)

- Cross, Tom Peete; Slover, Clark Harris, eds. (1936). The Fate of the Children of Tuirenn. Oxford: Henry Holt & Co. pp. 49–81. Archived from the original on 8 January 2014.
- O'Curry, Eugene, ed. (1863), "The Fate of the Children of Tuireann ([A]oidhe Chloinne Tuireann)", Atlantis, 4: 157–240, archived from the original on 21 April 2024
- O'Duffy, Richard J., ed. (1888), Oidhe Chloinne Tuireann: Fate of the children of Tuireann, M.H. Gill & Son (for the Society for the Preservation of the Irish language)
- ——, ed. (1901). Oidhe Chloinne Tuireann: Fate of the children of Tuireann. M.H. Gill & Son (for the Society for the Preservation of the Irish language). (Some of the earlier notes on MSS in the earlier edition are wanting)
- Archived 6 March 2021 at the Wayback Machine

(M G L Baillie School of Archaeology and Palaeoecology, Queen's University, Belfast)

(Rennes Dindshenchas)

- Stokes, Whitley, ed. (1894), "Rennes Dindshenchas", Revue celtique, 15: 272–336, 418–484, idx & corrigenda 284–312, archived from the original on 16 September 2024, text via Internet Archive; e-text Archived 11 August 2016 at the Wayback Machine via UCD
- Stokes, Whitley, ed. (1895), "Rennes Dindshenchas", Revue celtique, 16: 31–83, 135–167 269–283, idx & corrigenda 284–312, text via Internet Archive; e-text Archived 2 August 2020 at the Wayback Machine via UCD

(Táin Bó Cuailnge, The Cattle Raid of Cooley)

- Kinsella, Thomas., ed. (1969). The Táin. Oxford: Oxford University Press. ISBN 0-19-280373-5.

(Other)

- Cross, Tom Peete and Clark Harris Slover. Ancient Irish Tales, Henry Holt & Company, Inc., 1936. ISBN 1-56619-889-5.
- Ellis, Peter Berresford. Dictionary of Celtic Mythology. Oxford: Oxford University Press, 1994. ISBN 0-19-508961-8.
- MacKillop, James. Dictionary of Celtic Mythology. Oxford: Oxford University Press, 1998. ISBN 0-19-280120-1.
- Ovist, Krista L. The integration of Mercury and Lugus: Myth and history in late Iron Age and early Roman Gaul. Chicago: University of Chicago Divinity School dissertation, pp. 703, 2004. (link) Archived 16 September 2024 at the Wayback Machine
- Squire, Charles (1905). The Mythology of the British Islands: An Introduction to Celtic Myth, Legend, Poetry, and Romance. London: Blackie and Son.
- Wood, Juliette. The Celts: Life, Myth, and Art. Thorsons Publishers, 2002. ISBN 0-00-764059-5.

Preceded by Nuada	High King of Ireland; AFM 1870–1830 BC; FFÉ 1447–1407 BC	Succeeded by Eochaid Ollathair

Preceded by Amergin Glúingel	Chief Ollam of Ireland; Mythological era	Succeeded by Adna mac Uthidir
