= Brian (mythology) =

Character in Gaelic mythology

- Member of the Sons of Tuireann
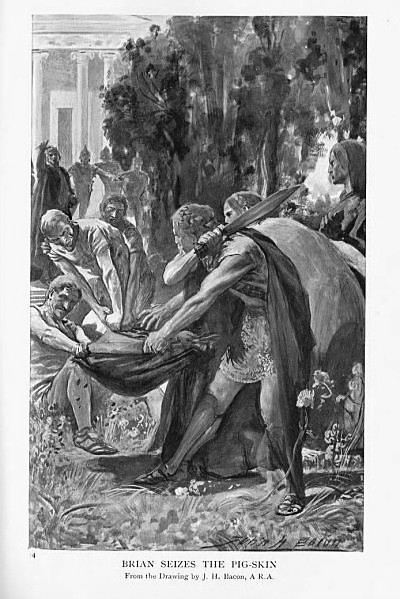
- "Brian Seizes the Pig-Skin", illustration by J.H. Bacon, c.1905.
- Other names: Uar, Uair
- Enemy: Cian, Lugh
- Region: Ireland

Genealogy
- Parents: Danu and Tuireann
- Siblings: Iuchar, Iucharba

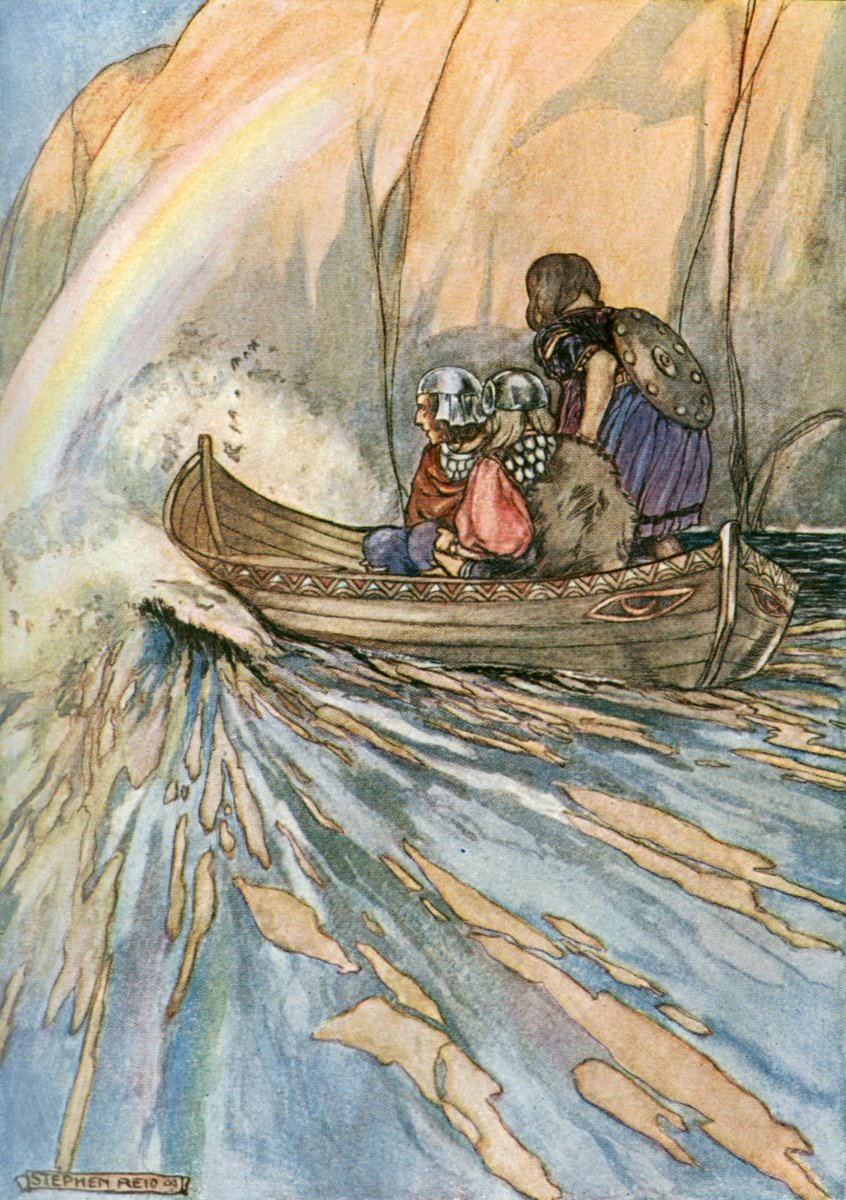
Stephen Reid's illustration of the Sons of Tuireann in Manannán's boat

In Gaelic mythology, Brian (or Uar) was one of the three Sons of Tuireann along with Iuchar and Iucharba. Their mother was the goddess Danu.

== Name ==
In many extant institutionally-held manuscripts of the Oidheadh Chlainne Tuireann, Brian is actually called Uar (or Uair), but the name has been emended by editors to "Brian" which conforms with the name in ancient texts. (Note: O'Duffy used as base a manuscript in the hand of William Casey of Tralee (1820), and also lists several RIA held manuscripts he consulted.) Eugene O'Curry was working from a manuscript in his possession, and gives the name as "Brian", but notes that "Uar" was an alternate name for Brian.

== Plot ==
In Oidheadh Chlainne Tuireann (The Tragedy of the Sons of Tuireann), the three set out to kill their father's enemy Cian. Cian is the father of Lugh, one of the greatest of the Tuatha Dé Danann. Cian shapeshifts into a pig to disguise himself, but the brothers shapeshift into dogs (in some versions, Brian transforms his two brothers without transforming himself) and hound him. They kill him, allowing him to transform back into a human before they do so. Then they dismember his body and try to cover up their crime. In recompense, Lugh makes them quest all around the known world fetching magical weapons, which Lugh plans to use at the Second Battle of Magh Tuireadh. They succeed in obtaining all that Lugh demanded, but return to Ireland badly wounded, pleading for Lugh to heal them; but he refuses.

In at least one version of this tale, Brian is the clever and subtle one, while his brothers Iuchar and Iucharba are bumbling and easily overawed by Brian. This tale of the Sons of Tuireann has sometimes been likened to an Irish Argonautica.

In some versions of the myth Lugh gives them eight impossible tasks, seven of which they succeed in completing. However, the brothers fail the final task and Lugh kills them.

== See also ==
- Brian - In later Scottish folklore, a pompous man who helped the Cailleach rescue Deò-ghrèine.
