= Tuireann =

Irish mythological figure

In Irish mythology, Tuireann (Old Irish: Tuirenn or Tuirill Biccreo) was the father by Danu (or Brigid) of Brian, Iuchar, and Iucharba, who killed Lugh's father Cian. As an éraic (a recompense fine), they were sent on a quest recounted as Oidheadh Chlainne Tuireann (The Tragedy of the Sons of Tuireann), one of the Three sorrowful tales of Erin. After Lugh had taken his elaborate revenge, Tuireann died of grief over their graves. He is considered to be a god associated with the sky due to his linguistic and symbolic connection to the Gaulish deity Taranis.

He is stated in various portions of Lebor Gabála Érenn to be the same person as Delbáeth mac Ogma, who is also credited as the father of Brian, Iuchar, and Iucharba.
