= Marie Henri d'Arbois de Jubainville =

French historian

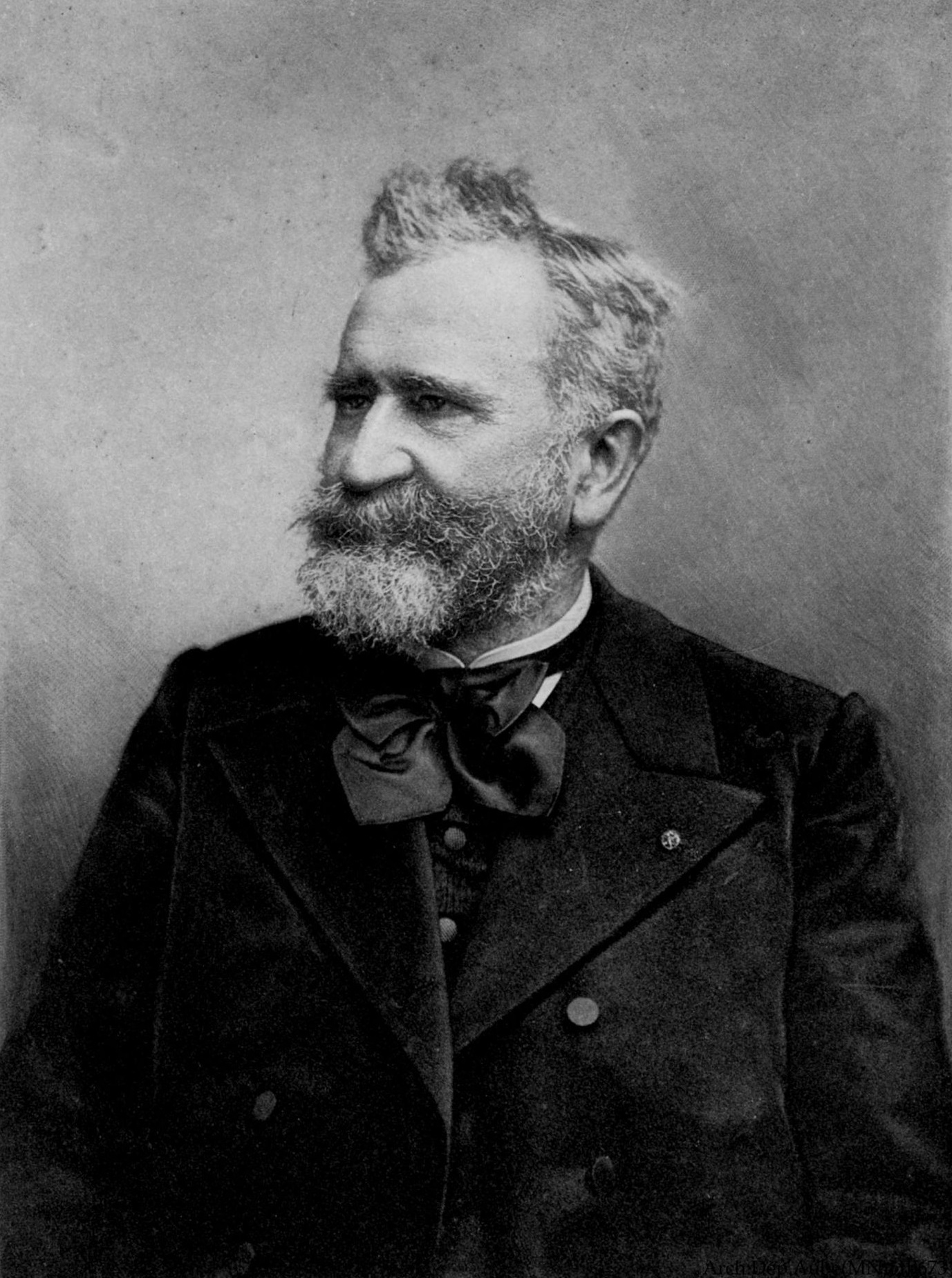
Henri d'Arbois de Jubainville

Henri d'Arbois de Jubainville (French: [maʁi ɑ̃ʁi daʁbwa də ʒybɛ̃vil]; 5 December 1827 – 26 February 1910) was a French historian, philologist and Celtic scholar.

== Career ==
He qualified as a lawyer in 1850, and entered a seminary with the intention of becoming a Catholic priest, but his attention turned to French history and in 1851 he left the École des Chartes with the degree of palaeographic archivist. He was placed in control of the departmental archives of Aube, and remained in that position until 1880, when he retired on a pension.

He published several volumes of inventorial abstracts, a Répertoire archéologique du département in 1861; a valuable Histoire des ducs et comtes de Champagne depuis le VIe siècle jusqu'à la fin du XIe, which was published between 1859 and 1869 (8 volumes), and in 1880 an instructive monograph, Les Intendants de Champagne. Already he had become attracted to the study of the ancient inhabitants of Gaul; in 1870 he brought out an Étude sur la déclinaison des noms propres dans la langue franque à l'époque mérovingienne; and in 1877 a learned work on Les Premiers habitants de l'Europe (2nd edition in 2 vols. 1889 and 1894).

Next he concentrated his efforts on the field of Celtic languages, literature and law, in which he soon became an authority. Appointed in 1882 to the newly founded professorial chair of Celtic at the Collège de France, he began the Cours de littérature celtique in 1908 extended to twelve volumes. For this he himself edited the following works: Introduction à l'étude de la littérature celtique (1883); L'Épopée celtique en Irlande (1892); Études de droit celtique (1895); and Les Principaux auteurs de l'Antiquité à consulter sur l'histoire des Celtes (1902).

He was among the first in France to study the most ancient monuments of Irish literature with a solid philological preparation and without prejudice.

== Personal life ==
He was born at Nancy, son of Charles-Joseph d’Arbois de Jubainville and Henriette de Beaufort de Gellercourt, a couple who were greatly influenced by Jean-Jacques Rousseau. He married Melanie de Plante-Wildentag in 1857. After her death, in 1863, he married Charlotte de Pinterville de Cernon with whom he had children, including a son, Paul.

== See also ==
- List of archivists
