= Eithne Tháebfhota =

Daughter of the king Cathaír Mór

Eithne Tháebfhota ("of the Long Side") was one of the daughters of High King of Ireland Cathaír Mór. Irish mythology describes her as the queen of two kings of different generations.

== Queen of Ireland ==
In most Old Irish writing, she is the wife of Conn Cétchathach. Her marriage was thought beneficial to the kingdom; until her death the fields gave three harvests a year, showing that she was a form of the goddess of Sovereignty.

== Esnada Tige Buchet ==
In The Melodies of Buchet's House, Eithne was in fosterage to Buchet when her numerous brothers came and stole his cattleherds. Buchet forced to leave his house, with his wife and Eithne. They lived in a small hut, at the forest of Kells, when she met her future husband, Cormac mac Airt, Conn's grandson. She spends a night with him, to conceive Cairbre Lifechair.

== Echtrae Cormaic ==
In The Adventure of Cormac, she also appears to be Cormac's wife.

== Family tree ==
Tuathal Techtmar
Fedlimid Rechtmar | Cathair Mór
Conn Cétchathach | Eithne Tháebfhota
Medb Lethderg | Art mac Cuinn | Achtan | Connla | Macnia mac Lugdach | Sadb | Ailill Aulom | Saruit | Conaire Cóem
Cormac mac Airt | Lugaid mac Con | Éogan Mór
Connachta | Uí Néill | * | Uí Maine | Airgíalla | Connacht Elanesse | *

== Sources ==
Extrait of "Eithne Tháebfhota on Oxford Index"
