= Tadc mac Céin =

Figure, possibly mythical, in Irish history

Tadc mac Céin, in medieval Irish historical tradition, was the grandson of Ailill Aulom and Sadb, daughter of Conn Cetcathach. He is the putative ancestor of the Ciannachta, the Gailenga, and the Luigni. These peoples were settled, in the Middle Ages, in the Midland kingdoms of Brega and Mide, Connacht, and western Ulster.

According to saga and genealogical tradition, Tadc established himself in the Midlands of Ireland after being granted territory by Cormac mac Airt, the king of Ireland (and Tadc's first cousin once removed, via Sadb), in exchange for his decisive assistance at the Battle of Crinna, against Fergus Dubdétach, king of the Ulaid. Tadc's role in the battle and the battle's wider context are related in the saga, Cath Crinna ('the battle of Crinna'). Another medieval text, Eachtra Thaidg Mhic Céin ('Tadg mac Céin's adventure'), narrates an earlier, fantastical expedition by Tadc to rescue his people from captivity overseas.

The Old Irish name, Tadc, is thought to be derived from the Gaulish *tazgos, meaning 'badger'. Another story about Tadc mac Céin, found in its earliest form in Sanas Cormaic, revolves around Tadc having a dietary taboo against eating badgers. As Mac an Bhaird argues, this implies that this was still how his name was understood, as traditional taboos against eating one's namesake are well-attested internationally. The hero Cú Chulainn ("Culann's Hound") had a similar taboo against eating dog-meat.
