= Cormac mac Airt =

High King of Ireland

- High King of Ireland
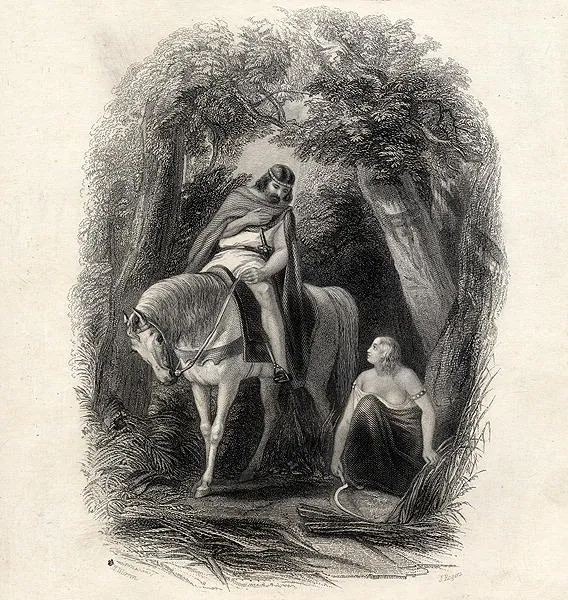
- Reign: 204–244 AD (Foras Feasa ar Éirinn)
- Predecessor: Fergus Dubdétach
- Successor: Eochaid Gonnat
- Spouse: Eithne Tháebfhota
- Issue: Cairbre Lifechair; Gráinne
- House: Connachta

Cormac mac Airt, also known as Cormac ua Cuinn (grandson of Conn) or Cormac Ulfada (long beard), was, according to medieval Irish legend and historical tradition, a High King of Ireland. He is probably the most famous of the ancient High Kings, and may have been an authentic historical figure, although many legends have attached themselves to him, and his reign is variously dated as early as the 2nd century and as late as the 4th. He is said to have ruled from Tara, the seat of the High Kings of Ireland, for forty years, and under his rule, Tara flourished. He is credited for building many of the monuments at the Hill of Tara such as the Banqueting Hall, Cormac's house, and Gráinne's Enclosure, named after his daughter. He was famous for his wise, true, and generous judgments. In the Annals of Clonmacnoise, translated in 1627, he is described as:

"absolutely the best king that ever reigned in Ireland before himself...wise learned, valiant and mild, not given causelessly to be bloody as many of his ancestors were, he reigned majestically and magnificently".

The hero Fionn mac Cumhaill is supposed to have lived in Cormac's time, and most of the stories of the Fenian Cycle are set during his reign.

== Birth and childhood ==
Cormac's father was the former High King Art mac Cuinn. His mother was Achtan, daughter of Olc Acha, a smith (or druid) from Connacht. Cormac had a younger brother, Alastir.

According to the saga "The Battle of Mag Mucrama", Olc gave Art hospitality the night before the Battle of Maigh Mucruimhe. It had been prophesied that a great dignity would come from Olc's line, so he offered the High King his daughter to sleep with that night, and Cormac was conceived (Geoffrey Keating says that Achtan was Art's official mistress, to whom he had given a dowry of cattle).

The story is told that Achtan had a vision as she slept next to Art. She saw herself with her head cut off and a great tree growing out of her neck. Its branches spread all over Ireland, until the sea rose and overwhelmed it. Another tree grew from the roots of the first, but the wind blew it down. At that, she woke up and told Art what she had seen. Art explained that the head of every woman is her husband, and that she would lose her husband in battle the next day. The first tree was their son, who would be king over all Ireland, and the sea that overwhelmed it was a fishbone that he would die choking on. The second tree was his son, Cairbre Lifechair, who would be king after him, and the wind that blew him down was a battle against the fianna, in which he would fall. The following day Art was defeated and killed by his nephew Lugaid mac Con, who became the new High King.

Cormac was carried off in infancy by a she-wolf and reared with her cubs in the caves of Kesh (Keash, Co Sligo), but a hunter found him and brought him back to his mother. Achtan then took him to Fiachrae Cassán, who had been Art's foster father. On the way, they were attacked by wolves, but wild horses protected them.

== Rise to power ==
At the age of thirty, armed with his father's sword, Cormac came to Tara, where he met a steward consoling a weeping woman. The steward explained that the High King had confiscated her sheep because they had cropped the queen's woad garden. Cormac declared, "More fitting would be one shearing for another," because both the woad and the sheep's fleeces would grow again. When Lugaid heard this, he conceded that Cormac's judgement was superior to his and abdicated the throne. Other traditions say that Cormac drove Lugaid out by force, or that he left Tara because his druids had prophesied he would not live another six months if he stayed. In all versions he went to his kin in Munster, where the poet Ferches mac Commain killed him with a spear as he stood with his back to a standing stone.

But Cormac was unable to claim the High Kingship, as the king of the Ulaid, Fergus Dubdétach, drove him into Connacht, and took the throne himself. He turned to Tadg mac Céin, a local nobleman whose father had been killed by Fergus, promising him as much land on the plain of Brega as he could drive his chariot round in a day if he would help him claim the throne. Tadg advised him to recruit his grandfather's brother Lugaid Láma. Cormac sought him out, and when he found him lying in a hunting booth, wounded him in the back with a spear. Lugaid revealed that it had been he who had killed Cormac's father in the Battle of Maigh Mucruimhe, and Cormac demanded, as éraic for Art's life, that Lugaid give him Fergus' head.

Having recruited Tadg and Lugaid, Cormac marched against Fergus, and The Battle of Crinna began. Tadg led the battle, keeping Cormac out of the action at the rear. Lugaid took the head of Fergus' brother, Fergus Foltlebair, and brought it to Cormac's attendant, who told him this was not the head of the king of Ulster. He then took the head of Fergus's other brother, Fergus Caisfhiachlach, but again the attendant told him it was the wrong head. Finally, he killed Fergus Dubdétach himself, and when the attendant confirmed he'd got the right man, Lugaid killed him and collapsed from exhaustion and loss of blood.

Tadg routed Fergus's army, and ordered his charioteer to make a circuit of the plain of Brega to include Tara itself. He was severely wounded, and fainted during the circuit. When he came to, he asked the charioteer if he had driven around Tara yet. When the charioteer answered no, Tadg killed him, but before he could complete the circuit himself, Cormac came upon him and ordered physicians to treat his wounds - treatment which took a whole year. Cormac took the throne, and Tadg ruled large tracts of land in the northern half of Ireland.

== Family ==
According to the saga "The Melody of the House of Buchet", Cormac married Eithne Táebfada, daughter of Cathaír Mór and foster-daughter of Buchet, a wealthy cattle-lord from Leinster whose hospitality was so exploited that he was reduced to poverty. However, in other traditions, Eithne is the wife of Cormac's grandfather Conn Cétchathach. Keating says the foster daughter of Buchet that Cormac married was another Eithne, Eithne Ollamda, daughter of Dúnlaing, king of Leinster. Also according to Keating, Cormac took a second wife, Ciarnait, daughter of the king of the Cruthin, but Eithne, out of jealousy of her beauty, forced her to grind nine measures of grain every day. Cormac freed her from this labour by having a watermill built.

Cormac's sons, Dáire, Cellach, Anlach and Cairbre Lifechair, and ten daughters. Two of his daughters, Gráinne and Aillbe, married the hero Fionn mac Cumhaill. In the well-known story "The Pursuit of Diarmuid and Gráinne", Gráinne was betrothed to Fionn, but instead ran off with a young warrior of the fianna, Diarmuid Ua Duibhne. Diarmuid and Fionn were eventually reconciled, but Fionn later contrived Diarmuid's death during a boar hunt, but was shamed by his son Oisín into making amends to Gráinne. Fionn and Gráinne were married, and Gráinne persuaded her sons not to make war against Fionn.

== Reign ==
Cormac's reign is recorded in some detail in the Irish annals. He fought many battles, subduing the Ulaid and Connacht and leading a lengthy campaign against Munster. In the fourteenth year of his reign, he is said to have sailed to Britain and made conquests there. In the fifteenth, thirty maidens were slaughtered in Tara by Dúnlaing, king of Leinster, for which Cormac had twelve Leinster princes put to death. In other texts, he is said to have been temporarily deposed twice by the Ulaid, and to have once gone missing for four months. He is also said to have compiled the Psalter of Tara, a book containing the chronicles of Irish history, the laws concerning the rents and dues kings were to receive from their subjects, and records of the boundaries of Ireland.

Although he is usually remembered as a wise and just ruler, one story presents him in a less flattering light. Having distributed all the cattle he had received as tribute from the provinces, Cormac found himself without any cattle to provision his own household after a plague struck his herds. A steward persuaded him to treat Munster as two provinces, the southern of which had never paid tax. He sent messengers to demand payment, but Fiachu Muillethan, the king of southern Munster, refused, and Cormac prepared for war. His own druids, who had never advised him badly, foresaw disaster, but he ignored them, preferring to listen to five druids from the sidhe supplied by his fairy lover, Báirinn.

Cormac marched to Munster and made camp on the hill of Druim Dámhgaire (Knocklong, County Limerick). His new druids' magic made the camp impregnable and his warriors unbeatable, dried up all sources of water used by the Munstermen, and nearly drove Fiacha to submission. But Fiacha in desperation turned to the powerful Munster druid Mug Ruith for aid, and his magic was too strong even for Cormac's fairy druids. He restored the water and conjured up magical hounds who destroyed the fairy druids. His breath created storms and turned men to stone. Cormac was driven out of Munster and compelled to seek terms.

In the tale Echtra Cormaic (Lady Gregory, GAFM IV.11 "His Three Calls to Cormac" ) the Irish King is tempted by the sea-god Manannan mac Lir with treasure, specifically a "shining branch having nine apples of red gold," in exchange for his family. Cormac is led into the Otherworld (Land of Promise) and taught a harsh lesson by Manannán, but in the end, his wife and children are restored to him. Also, Manannán rewards him with a wonderful gold cup which breaks if three lies are spoken over it and is made whole again if three truths are spoken. Cormac used this cup during his kingship to distinguish falsehood from truth. When Cormac died, the cup vanished, just as Manannan had predicted it would.

The 8th-century text The Expulsion of the Déisi describes enmity between Cormac and the group known as the Déisi, descendants of Cormac's great-grandfather Fedlimid Rechtmar who had been his retainers. Cormac's son Cellach (or Conn) abducts Forach, the daughter of a Déisi leader. Her uncle Óengus Gaíbúaibthech comes to rescue her, but Cellach refuses to release her. Óengus runs Cellach through with his "dread spear", which has three chains attached to it; these chains wound one of Cormac's advisers and blind Cormac in one eye. Cormac fights seven battles against the Déisi, and expels them from their lands. After a period of wandering, they settled in Munster. Cormac, having lost an eye, moves into the Tech Cletig on the hill of Achall, as it was against the law for a disfigured king to sit in Tara. His duties as king are taken on by his son Cairbre Lifechair.

== Death ==
After ruling for forty years, Cormac choked to death on a salmon bone. Some versions blame this on a curse laid by a druid because Cormac had converted to Christianity. Some versions of the Lebor Gabála Érenn synchronise his reign with that of the Roman emperor Marcus Aurelius (161–180). Keating dates his reign to 204–244; the Annals of the Four Masters to 226–266. An entry in the Annals of Ulster dates his death as late as 366. He was succeeded by Eochaid Gonnat.

== Family tree ==
Conn Cétchathach	Eithne Táebfada
Medb Lethderg	Art mac Cuinn	Achtan	Macnia mac Lugdach	Sabd	Ailill Aulom
Cormac mac Airt	Eithne Ollamda	Lugaid mac Con	Éogan Mór
Cairbre Lifechair	Diarmuid Ua Duibhne	Gráinne	Fionn mac Cumhaill	Aillbe	Fiachu Muillethan
Fíacha Sroiptine	Eochaid Doimlén	Ailill Flann Bec
Connachta	Uí Néill	*	Uí Maine	Airgíalla	Eóganachta

Preceded by Fergus Dubdétach	High King of Ireland; LGE 2nd century FFE 204–244; AFM 226–266; AU 326–366	Succeeded by Eochaid Gonnat
