= Dal Fiachrach Suighe =

Irish lineage

The Dal Fiachrach Suighe (English: Seed of Fiachra Suighe) were an Irish lineage claiming descent from Fiachra Suighe (also spelt Fiacha Suidhe), the youngest of six sons of Fedlimid Rechtmar. His oldest brother was the legendary High King Conn Cétchathach. They are the ancestors of the Déisi Muman and the Déisi Tuisceart (later known as the Dál gCais).

Fiachra's great-great-great-great grandsons, the four sons of Art Corb, were expelled from Tara, a story told in The Expulsion of the Déisi. One group, led by Eochaid Allmhuir, settled in Dyfed c. 270, while the second group eventually settled among the Déisi of south Munster. These events have been tied to Irish pirate raids all over the west coast of Roman Britain in the 4th and 5th centuries and to the foundation of the Irish kingdoms of Dyfed, Brecon and Cornwall around 400.
