= Achtan inion Olc Acha =

Irish historical figure

Achtan, fl. c. 1st-2nd centuries AD, mother of Cormac mac Airt.

== Achtan and Art mac Cuinn ==
In the Irish saga, Cath Maige Mucrama, Achtan is named as the daughter of Olc Acha of the Crich Óic Bethra, near what is now Clarenbridge, County Galway. The night before the Battle of Mag Mucrama, Art mac Cuinn he was a guest of Olc Acha, who asked him how many children he had. To ensure the survival of his bloodline in case of his death, Olc Acha proposed Art sleep with Achtan and conceive a son.

"It was then that Cormac was conceived. He (Art) told her she would bear a son and that that son would be king of Ireland. Then he told her of every hoard he had hidden for the benefit of that son. And he said that he would be killed the following day and he takes leave of her. He told her to bring her son for fostering to his friend among the Connachtmen. (Note: The name Connacht for this era is an anachronism. The Connachta, after whom the province is named, were said to have been the descendants of Conn Cétchathach, who is supposed to have lived several centuries later. Later stories use the name Cóiced Ol nEchmacht as an earlier name for the province of Connacht to get around this problem. The chronology of early Irish historical tradition is an artificial attempt by Christian monks to synchronise native traditions with classical and biblical history.) And on the following day he went to the battle."

Achtan gave birth to Cormac mac Airt, ancestor of the Connachta, making her ancestor of Irish dynasties such as Uí Fiachrach, Uí Briúin, Uí Ailello, Muintir Murchada. Families descended from these dynasties include MacDermot, O'Conor, Ó Cléirigh, O'Flaherty, O'Dowd, O'Shaughnessy, McGivergan and O Hynes.

== See also ==
- Lugaid mac Con
- Cycles of the Kings
- Lebor Gabála Érenn

== Sources ==
- Byrne, Francis John (1973), Irish Kings and High-Kings, London: Batsford, ISBN 0-7134-5882-8
- Charles-Edwards, T. M. (2000), Early Christian Ireland, Cambridge: Cambridge University Press, ISBN 0-521-36395-0
- MacKillop, James (1998), The Oxford Dictionary of Celtic Mythology, Oxford: Oxford University Press, ISBN 0-19-860967-1
- Wiley, Dan M. (2004), "Cath Maige Mucrama", The Cycles of the Kings, archived from the original on 2 September 2006
