= Leath Cuinn and Leath Moga =

Ancient divisions of Ireland

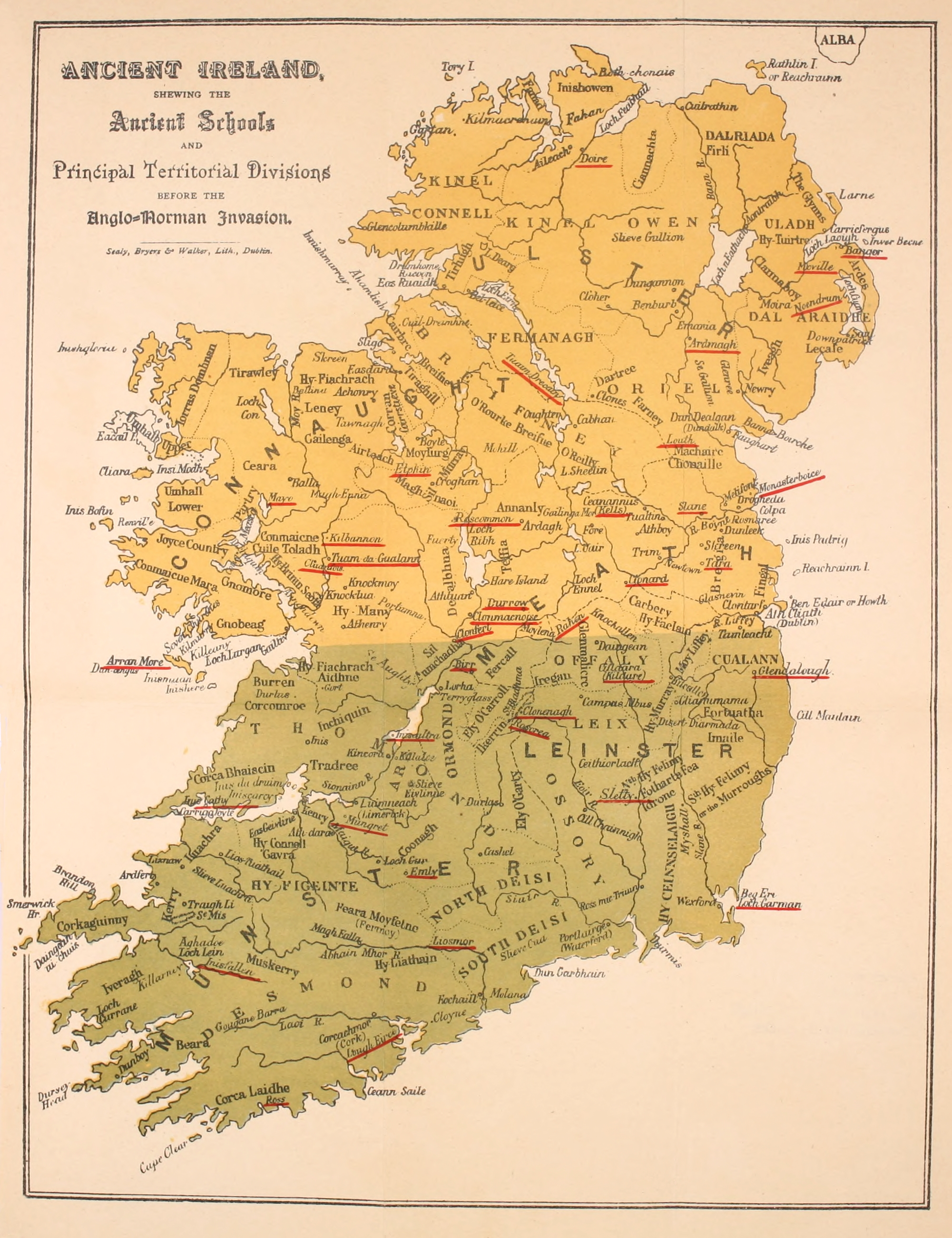
Map of Gaelic Ireland: Leth Cuinn in yellow, Leth Moga in green.

Leath Cuinn (Conn's Half) and Leath Moga (Mug's half) are legendary ancient divisions of Ireland, respectively north and south of a line corresponding to the Esker Riada running east–west from Dublin Bay to Galway Bay. The eponymous Conn and Mug were Conn Cétchathach (Conn of the Hundred Battles) and Éogan Mór Mug Nuadat (the Servant of Nuada), whose armies in 123 AD fought the battle of Mag Lena (the Plain of Lena, in what is now County Offaly between Tullamore and Durrow).

== Legend ==
At Mag Lena, the army of Conn, the High King of Ireland, lost to that of Mug Nuadat, the king of Munster, to whom Conn was thus forced to cede the southern half of Ireland. Thereafter the provinces of Ireland were grouped as follows:

- Leath Cuinn (Conn's Half, the north) comprised Connacht, Ulster and Meath;
- Leath Moga (Mug Nuadat's Half, the south) comprised Munster (including Osraighe) and Leinster.

To solidify the arrangement, Conn's daughter Sadb was married to Ailill Aulom, son of Mug Nuadat. Their son was another Éogan Mór, founder of the Eóganachta dynasty which ruled Munster.

Conn was the ancestor of the dynasties of the Connachta (named after him and later eponymous overlords of Connacht) and their northern offshoots the Uí Néill (of whose descendants the Northern Uí Néill drove the Ulaid out of west Ulster, while the Southern Uí Néill took most of Meath).

== Later history ==
The Eóganachta's control of Leath Moga was largely confined to Munster. David Sproule of the Dublin Institute for Advanced Studies suggests the names Leath Cuinn and Leath Moga originally had their literal meaning "Head Half" and "Slave Half", with the figures of Conn and Mug Nuadat created centuries later as etiological myth, elaborated by the Eóganachta to bolster their territorial claims. Their historic right to rule Leinster as part of Leath Moga was disputed by the Southern Uí Néill, while Osraighe was formally ceded to Leath Cuinn in 859.

The Synod of Ráth Breasail in 1111 AD created territorial dioceses in Ireland, divided into two ecclesiastical provinces, with archbishops in Armagh and in Cashel, respectively corresponding to Leath Cuinn and Leath Moga. This was altered when the 1152 Synod of Kells separated the provinces of Tuam and Dublin from Armagh and Cashel respectively.

== Annalistic references ==
See Annals of Inisfallen (AI)

- AI929.2 Repose of Tuathal, learned bishop of Leth Cuinn.

== Sources ==
- Aubrey Gwynn, The Irish Church in the Eleventh and Twelfth Centuries, Gerard O'Brien (ed.) (Four Courts Press, 1992).
- Seaán Mór Ó Dubhagáin and Giolla-Na-Naomh Ó Huidhrín, Topographical Poems, James Carney (ed.) (Dublin Institute for Advanced Studies, 1943).
