= Fiachu Muillethan =

Fiachu Muillethan (broad crown) or Fiachu Fer Da Liach (of the two sorrows), son of Éogan Mór, was a legendary king belonging to the Deirgtine, the proto-historical ancestors of the Eóganachta dynasties of Munster. He is known primarily from the saga Forbhais Droma Dámhgháire, in which he is assisted by the famous Mug Ruith, who repels an invasion of his kingdom by Cormac mac Airt. The sons of Fiachu Muillethan were Ailill Flann Mór and Ailill Flann Bec.

Like his father Éogan Mór, grandfather Ailill Aulom, and great-grandfather Mug Nuadat, Fiachu Muillethan appears to be mainly fictional. The circumstances of his life are entirely legendary, seemingly invented so as to provide the Eóganachta with an ancestral contemporary of Cormac mac Airt. This is apparent from the conception of Fiachu as described in the Cath Maige Mucrama.

While the career of Fiachu Muillethan may be entirely legendary, that of his supposed great-grandson Conall Corc, the true founder of the Eóganachta, may preserve an amount of historical fact.

As in many such cases, Muillethan and Fer Da Liach may have started out two different figures later thought to be the same, whether mythological or historical. The medieval genealogists are at pains to assert they were identical but base their argument only on the story of Fiachu's birth in the Cath Maige Mucrama, a well known saga of political fiction.
