= Echtra Condla =

Ancient Irish book

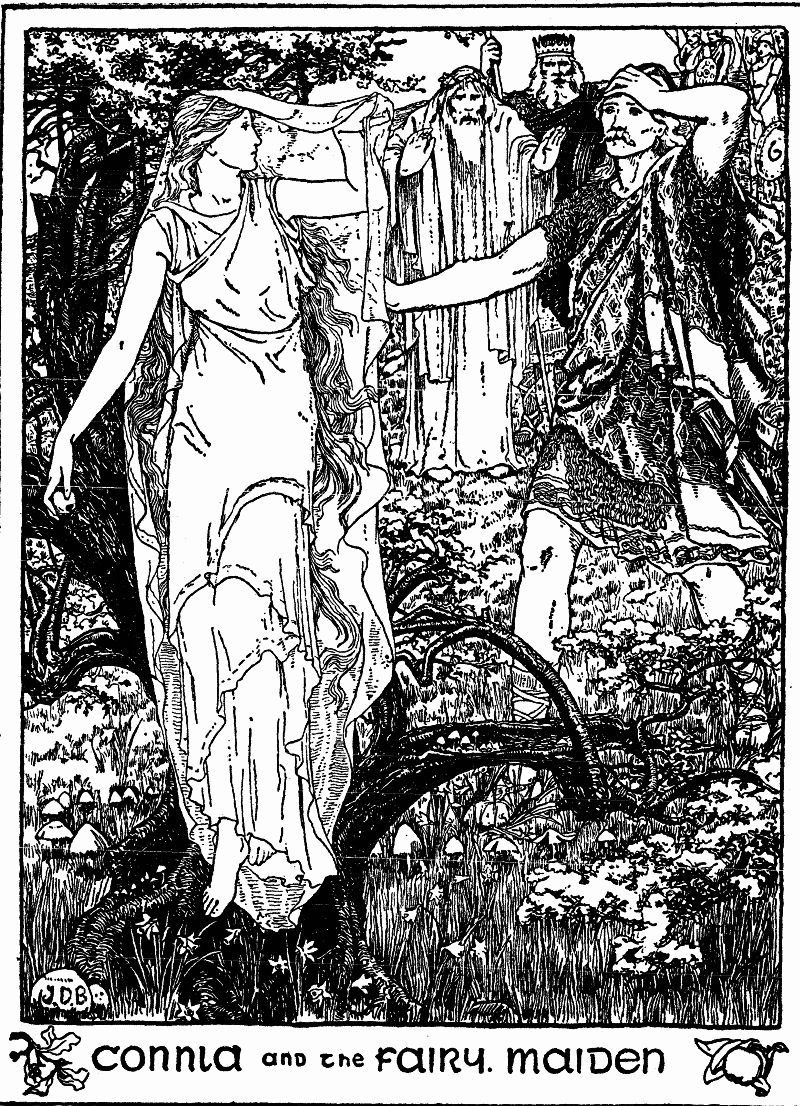
"Connla and the Fairy Maiden" by John D. Batten

Echtra Condla, (Note: Also rendered as Echtrae Chonnlai) ("The adventure of Connla") is an Old Irish echtra tale known in two variants from eight manuscripts, the earliest of which has been dated to the 12th C. – the tale may have been written down first as early as the 8th C. The two variants do not diverge sharply from one another, so that a single summary suffices for both.

The tale tells of the 'seduction' of Connla, son of Conn of the Hundred Battles by a woman of the Aos Si. In addition to what seems to be a story from pre-Christian tradition the story also incorporates what has interpreted to be a post-Christian and anti-druidic message from the woman herself, thus foretelling the coming of Christianity.

The echtra contains most of what is known of 'Connla son of Conn of the Hundred Battles', a.k.a. 'Connla the Ruddy', or 'Connla the Fair'. (Note: Condla Ruad - the red, or ruddy; Condla Cain - the fair.)

== Plot summary ==
Summary derived from (McCone 2000) and (Oskamp 1974), cf (O'Beirne Crowe 1874) and (MacSwiney 1884)

Echtra Condla opens at the Hill of Uisneach, where the tale's eponymous hero, Conle (the Ruddy), is sitting with his father, Conn of the Hundred Battles. A strangely dressed woman appears, and Conle asks of her where she is from.

She explains that she is from the "Land of the Living" (Tír na mBeo), where people feast for ever without effort, and live in peace without sin. (Note: All three elements are commonly used to describe an Otherworld in Irish myth, (see also "Celtic Otherworld"), and as such likely makes her of the Aos Sí.)

Conn asks Conle who he is talking to, as no one but Conle could see the woman. The woman then replies, stating she invites Conle to the "Plain of Delights" (Mag Mell) where the king is Bóadag, promising that Conle can stay for ever. All heard the woman, but could not see her; Conn then asked his druid Corann for help, since he saw he would lose his own son to the woman. Corann intoned a spell where the woman's voice was heard so that Conle could not see her anymore. The strange woman then leaves, but as she does she tosses an apple to Conle.

Conle subsists on this fruit for an entire month, eschewing all other food and drink. The apple remains whole even after Conle eats from it, indicating its otherworldly nature. Conle longs to see the woman again.

The woman reappears after a month, this time on the plain of Arcommin. She speaks to Conle and Conn calls for his druid again, but the woman reproaches him, saying he should not resort to druidry. The woman speaks to Conn rebuking the druid, describing his words as lies coming from a demon. Conn notes that Conle will not respond to anyone except the woman, and asks if the woman's words have a hold on him. Conle responds that he is torn between his people and the woman.

The woman then beckons Conle to come with her, promising a happy land full only of women and maidens. Conle then jumps into the woman's 'crystal ship' (Noi Glano, or Loing Glano), (Note: Noi Glano - (O'Beirne Crowe 1874, p. 122) translates a "Curach of Pearl". In a verse in the same work, the ship is described as Loing Glano - literally "ship [of] crystal".) and those left watch it sail away until it is too far to see. [End]

In three manuscripts, a sort of postscript follows, explaining that Art mac Cuinn was also called Art Óenfer (Art the Solitary) because after Conle's departure he was Conn's only son.

== Analysis ==
Linguistic analysis of the texts led McCone to derive that the tale has an 8th C. archetype, and that the versions in the 12th C. Lebor na hUidre derive from 10th C. versions, whilst it is the 14th C. versions in the Yellow Book of Lecan that is closer to the 8th C. "original".

Oskamp 1974 states that the text should be understood as a literary production of the twelfth century, whatever older strata of tradition may have informed it.

Some scholars see a clear Christian message in this extract :

Gaelic	English
Amail rochuala Cond guth na mna, asbert fri a muintir: "Gairid dam in drúid : atchíu doreilced a tenga di indiu." Asbert in ben la sodain: "A Chuind Chetcathaig, druidecht nísgradaigther, ap is bec posoich for messu ar Tráig Máir firién con il-muinteraib ilib, adamraib. Motá ticfa a récht, consscéra brichtu drúad tap techta ar bélaib Demuin duib, dolbthig."	When Cond heard the lady's voice, he said to his people: "Call ye the Druid to me. I see her tongue has been allowed her to-day." At this the lady said: "Cond, fighter of a hundred, druidism is not loved, for little has it attained to honours on righteous Great Strand, with its numerous, wondrous, various families. When its law shall appear, it will scatter the charms of druids from journeying on the lips of the black, lying Demon."
From O'Beirne Crowe 1874

Other translators render Tráig Máir not as "Great Strand" but as "Great High King", (Note: McCone 2000 gives the translation It is in a little while that the Great High King's righteous (and) decent one will reach your judgements with many wondrous followers) and then infer the text might refer to the Christian God and his "righteous one" to Jesus Christ, Oskamp argues that the interpretation with Jesus as the Great High King and the "righteous one" as Saint Patrick is good. McCone has interpreted the woman as representing Christianity itself, while others (Olsen, 2013) finds that metaphor too extended.

There is also a related issue of interpretation of the Gaelic síd (as either "peace" or "fairy mounds") in the context of "people of the síd" – others such as (Ó Cathasaigh 1979) and (Carey 1995), have considered that the usage is a deliberate pun, or bridge between the two interpretations. Earlier translators such as (O'Beirne Crowe 1874) and (MacSwiney 1884) interpreted the text simply as Aos Si (People of the Mounds).

The woman also fulfills the role of the 'Celtic' sovereignty goddess, as well as retaining the seductive qualities of a pre-Christian goddess.

== Legacy ==
The tale has been retold in modern or modernised form. A typical retelling can be found in (Joyce 1879) as "Connla of the Golden Hair, and the Fairy Maiden", or in (Jacobs 1891) : "Conn and the Fairy Maiden". (Cross & Slover 1936) also translated the tale into English in "The Adventures of Connla the Fair" in Ancient Irish Tales.

== See also ==
- Connla Cáem 2nd C. prince mentioned in Lebor Gabála Érenn
- Connla, the son of Cú Chulainn
