= The Expulsion of the Déisi =

Irish mythological narrative

The Expulsion of the Déisi is a medieval Irish narrative of the Cycles of the Kings. It dates approximately to the 8th century, but survives only in manuscripts of a much later date. It describes the fictional history of the Déisi, a group that had gained political power in parts of Ireland during the Early Middle Ages. Part of the text's purpose is to provide the kings of the Déisi – historically the descendants of unlanded vassals to other tribes – with a mythical noble origin as the heirs to a dynasty expelled from Tara.

The story survives in two different Old Irish versions, which contain essentially the same narrative supplemented by singular additions, including tangential episodes, lists of names, and poetry. After violently recovering his niece from the depredations of the king's son of Tara, Óengus Gaíbúaibthech and his followers are dispossessed by the king and sent to wander Ireland. They tarry in Leinster for a period, but are eventually expelled from that kingdom as well. When military prowess fails them, they are able to forge a home for themselves through cunning and magic in Munster against the Osraige. As with much early Irish literature, the digressive onomastic and genealogical material is of great value. In particular, one passage describes a Déisi branch settling in Britain and founding the Kingdom of Dyfed, a matter of some interest in the context of early Irish migrations to Britain.

== Versions and manuscripts ==
The story survives in an earlier and a later version, which Kuno Meyer dubbed "A" and "B". The A version dates to the 8th century, but exists only in manuscripts of a significantly later date. It survives complete in the Book of the White Earl (MS Laud Misc. 610) and MS Rawlinson B 502, and in fragmentary form in the Leabhar Ua Maine and the Liber Flavus Fergusiorum. Of the complete copies, Meyer notes that the Rawlinson text contains fewer errors, but that Laud preserves more archaic spelling. The B version survives in some form in three manuscripts. The oldest of these is a fragment contained in the Book of the Dun Cow; this copy is complemented by the later two, found in H. 3. 17 and H. 2. 5, allowing for reconstruction of the text. The H. 2. 5 copy further contains several poems absent from the other manuscripts.

The title is recorded variously in the manuscripts. Rawlinson contains Tairired na n'Déssi, or The Journeying of the Déisi. Laud records it as De causis torche n'Déssi/acuis toirge na n'Déssi. The word torche/toirge is obscure, but Meyer associates it with "expedition". The B manuscripts all contain some reference to the injury visited upon Cormac mac Airt, one of the characters: the Book of the Dun Cow has Tucait innarba na n'Dési im Mumain & aided Cormaic, H. 3. 17 has Cóechad Cormaic i Temraig, and H. 2. 5 has Tucaid cháetcha Cormaic do Aengus Gaibuaibtheach & aigeag Ceallaig & fotha indarbtha na nDeissi do Muig Breag. Marie Henri d'Arbois de Jubainville's Catalogue further lists two possibly related titles: Longes Eithne Uathaige and Tochomlad na nDési a Temraig. However, it is unknown to which version, if either, these refer.

== Background ==
The term Déisi initially designated various subject peoples owing tribute to landowning tribes. It derives from the Old Irish déis, meaning "client(s)" or "vassalry"; this distinguishes it from other Irish ethnonyms that derive from ancestors' personal names. The Expulsion of the Déisi concerns one such group, the Déisi Muman of Munster, who lived primarily in the present-day counties of Waterford and Tipperary and were subject to the Eóganachta dynasty. Over time, the Déisi Muman grew in power, and were prominent enough to found their own local kingdom at a fairly early date. The various groups designated Déisi were not originally closely related, but by the mid-8th century, following the rise of the Déisi Muman, they came to be seen as a genealogically linked whole, descended from the same noble ancestors. The Expulsion of the Déisi gives a mythical origin narrative for the then powerful Déisi Muman and associated groups.

The Expulsion of the Déisi was long considered a more or less historically accurate account of a mass displacement of the Déisi and their subsequent settlement on the southwestern coast of Ireland and elsewhere. This was later disputed by scholars such as Eoin MacNeill, Patrick C. Power, T. F. O'Rahilly, and Séamus Pender, who regard it as late fiction.

== Narrative ==
Both versions describe the adventures of the Déisi forefathers in the time of Cormac mac Airt, King of Tara. They follow the same narrative track, but both contain sections that break from the main narrative and tell individual, largely unrelated stories about the Déisi and their contemporaries. A contains episodes not in B, and vice versa.

=== A version ===
In the A version, the Déisi are led by the four sons of Artchorp: Brecc, Óengus Gaíbúaibthech (Óengus of the Dread Spear), Eochaid Allmuir (Eochaid the Foreigner), and Forad. Forad's daughter Forach is raped and kidnapped by Conn (elsewhere Cellach), the "wanton son" of Cormac maic Airt. Óengus, who leads a band of fifty men, goes to Tara to rescue her. When Conn refuses to release the girl, Óengus runs him through with his "dread spear", which blinds Cormac in one eye in the process. Because the law forbids a high king to have a physical blemish, Cormac must retire to a ráth outside Tara, and defer the kingship to his son Cairbre Lifechair. Undeterred, Cormac raises his forces against the Déisi and expels them from Tara. Óengus, together with his brother Brecc's sons Russ and Eogan, engages the king in seven battles. After forty days Óengus succeeds Brecc as king of the Déisi, but steps down due to "murmurs" about his consolidation of the power of both champion and king. Cormac will not give the Déisi a fair fight, and pushes them into Leinster, where the local ruler Fiachu Bacceda drives the Uí Bairrche from their land and gives it to the Déisi. They remain there for three decades.

Eventually the Uí Bairrche warrior Eochu Guinech ejects the Déisi and they are compelled to move further south into Ard Ladrann, thereafter known as the "Land of the Wandering Host". Section 8 tells the story of Ethne the Dread, daughter of then King of Leinster Crimthann mac Énnai (d. 483) and an eventual fosterling of the Déisi. At her birth a druid prophesies that under Ethne her mother's kindred will seize what will be their homeland; hearing this her parents feed her the flesh of young boys to accelerate her growth. Meanwhile, Cormac continues to harass Óengus and the Déisi, stirring up discord among their warriors and leaders. He sends a peace offer to Russ and Eogan, the sons of Brecc, offering them absolution and land if they return to his service. Óengus promises them yet more land and preeminence over his children for them to remain.

When Crimthann mac Énnai dies, his sons turn on the Déisi, driving them out of Leinster altogether. They settle briefly in Osraige, but the king burns down their houses, leaving them homeless and forced to wander west into Munster. They receive some relief when Óengus mac Nad Froích (d. 489), King of Munster, proposes to marry Ethne the Dread, who has been traveling with the Déisi. He offers to grant her any three demands as the dowry. Ethne requests land for her mother's kindred, fulfilling her prophecy; she also requests that Osraige be cleared of its inhabitants and given to the Déisi, and that her people be as free as the "three Eoganacht of Munster". Óengus grants her wishes, but the Déisi are unable to oust the residents of Osraige. With the help of Lugaid Laigde Cosc, the seer-judge of the Corcu Loígde and Cashel, they devise a trick: learning of a prophecy that whichever side draws first blood the next day will be routed, the Déisi druids transform one of their men into a red cow. The men of Osraige kill the cow, thereby sealing their fate; they are pushed across the Lingaun River, which thereafter serves as the border between the Déisi and Osraige. The Déisi divide up their land, and most of the remainder of the text lists names of individual Déisi and septs descended from them.

=== B version ===
The B version contains the same basic narrative, with significant additions and subtractions. It was edited by Meyer in Anecdota from Irish Manuscripts. It likewise begins with the kidnapping of Forach by Cormac's son (here Cellach), but in this version Óengus is initially too busy avenging family insults with his famous spear to save her. It is only after he is rebuked for his dithering by a woman – whom he kills – that he rescues Forach, killing Cellach and blinding Cormac in the process. The story continues with the Déisis' expulsion from Tara, their sojourn in Leinster, and their patriation in Munster following the marriage arrangement between Ethne the Dread and Óengus mac Nad Froích. Here, however, aid in exploiting the prophecy that ultimately allows them to displace the men of Osraige comes not from a seer-judge, but from the "haughty daughter" of the Osraige druid who delivers the prognostication.

Of the material not in the A version, by far the most substantial is in a lengthy tangential episode dealing with the birth and childhood of Óengus's foster son Corc Duibne, progenitor of the Corcu Duibne, whose name is merely mentioned in A. Corc and his brother are born of incest to Coirpre Múse and Duihind, children of the king of Munster Conaire Cóem, and their nativity brings famine to the land. The people want them immolated, but Corc is saved by a druid and his wife who take him to an offshore island so that his curse is removed from Ireland. The druid's wife, Boí, performs purification rituals that ultimately transfer Corc's curse to an otherworldy white cow, allowing him to return to his family. Eventually he serves as hostage in Cormac mac Airt's court, where he is fostered by Óengus; he accompanies his foster father when he is expelled from Tara. He tries to convince the wandering Déisi to settle on the island of his rearing, and stays there when the Déisi opt to move on to Cashel.

The variant text MS 1336 (olim H. 3.17) occurs with the different title, Cóecad Cormaic i Temraig (Blinding of Cormac at Tara); this text is also postscripted by a tract which alleges that the Crimall, Óengus's spear in the age of Cormac, was the same weapon as the Lúin of Celtchar and the spear of Lugh.

== Dyfed ==
Section 11 of A describes Eochaid son of Artchorp traveling oversea with his descendants and settling in Demed (Demetia, later known as Dyfed in Wales). From Eochaid and his descendants springs the line of kings of Dyfed, whose descent is given down to "Tualodor mac Rígin" (Tudor map Regin). This genealogy has much correspondence with pedigrees in Welsh sources, namely the Harleian genealogies and the later genealogies from Jesus College MS 20. The Harleian records show the same names from Tudor back to the figure Triphun (Triffyn Farfog), given in Expulsion as Eochaid's great-grandson. However, Harleian gives an entirely different pedigree for Triphun himself, tracing his descent back to the Roman Emperor Constantine I. This could be an attempt by later genealogists to give a more illustrious pedigree to Dyfed's kingly line, or possibly to obscure its Irish origins.

There is indeed physical evidence of early Irish presence in Dyfed and elsewhere in Britain. Ogham inscriptions in an early form of Irish have been found in Pembrokeshire and Carmarthenshire. Additionally, later literary sources from both sides of the Irish Sea discuss the presence of southern Irish peoples in Britain. The 9th-century Historia Brittonum, for instance, refers to the Uí Liatháin being active in North Wales until they were pushed out by Cunedda and his sons (fl. mid-5th century). Cormac's Glossary also mentions the oversea exploits of the Uí Liatháin, but locates their fortress in Cornwall rather than Dyfed. However, only The Expulsion of the Déisi attests a specifically Déisi presence. Eoin MacNeill, who treats the literary accounts as largely historical, suggests that a Déisi settlement in Dyfed could have existed as a subordinate unit to a larger Uí Liatháin-led colony until the latter was expelled under Cunedda.
