= Mug Ruith =

Irish mythological figure

Mug Ruith (or Mogh Roith, "slave of the wheel") is a figure in Irish mythology, a powerful blind druid of Munster who lived on Valentia Island, County Kerry. He could grow to enormous size, and his breath caused storms and turned men to stone. He wore a hornless bull-hide and a bird mask, and flew in a ship called the roth rámach, the "oared wheel". He had a fiery ox-driven chariot with blazing jewels that made night seem as bright as day, a star-speckled black shield with a silver rim, and a stone which could turn into a poisonous eel when thrown in water.

== Legend ==
Stories about Mug Ruith are set in various periods of Irish history. Some say he lived during the reign of 3rd century High King Cormac mac Airt, while others put him in Jerusalem during the time of Christ. In Lebor Gabála Érenn he is said to have died in the reign of Conmael, nearly two thousand years before Cormac's time. Perhaps due to this array of times and settings, poets attributed the druid with extraordinary longevity (he lived through the reign of nineteen kings according to one story). His powers and long lifespan have led some to conclude he was a euhemerised sun or storm god.

The various medieval legends about his adventures in the Holy Land at the dawn of Christendom paint him as an interesting and mysterious character, a defender of paganism and an enemy of Christianity. He is said to have been a student of Simon Magus, who taught him his magic skills and helped him build roth rámach. Roth rámach is described as a flying machine with great destructive power. It blinds those who look at it, deafens whoever hears it, and kills whoever it strikes. A prophecy attributed to Saint Columba describes the ship's appearance over Europe as an omen of the Last Judgement. Another vehicle attributed to him is a chariot. This description leads scholar Aideen M. O'Leary to speculate he may have been an euhemerized sun god.

In at least two other poems Mug Ruith is identified as the executioner who beheaded John the Baptist, bringing a curse to the Irish people. He cuts an equally impressive figure in The Siege of Knocklong, set in Cormac mac Airt's time. Here he defeats Cormac's druids in an elaborate magical battle in exchange for land from King Fiachu Muillethan of southern Munster, from whom Cormac had been trying to levy taxes. Mug Ruith's daughter was Tlachtga, a powerful druidess, who gave her name to a hill in County Meath and a festival celebrated there. Tlachtga, who was raped by Simon Magus while her father was learning magic, gave birth to three sons Dorb, Cuma, and Muach.

The territory Mug Ruith received for his descendants was Fir Maige Féne, later known as Fermoy. The medieval tribe of Fir Maige Féne claimed descent from him, although they were ruled by the unrelated O'Keefes of Eóganacht Glendamnach.

He married The Cailleach and together they lived at the site of what is now Labbacallee wedge tomb until, in a fit of jealousy after he fell in love with her sister, the hag threw a boulder at the druid knocking him into the River Funshion where he died.

== Sources ==
- Seán Ó Duinn (translator) (1993), Forbhais Droma Dámhgháire: The Siege of Knocklong
- James MacKillop (1998). Dictionary of Celtic Mythology. London: Oxford. ISBN 0-19-860967-1.
