= Fergus Dubdétach =

Fergus Dubdétach ("black-tooth") was, according to medieval Irish legend and historical tradition, a king of the Ulaid who was briefly High King of Ireland. He took the High Kingship after his predecessor, Lugaid mac Con, was expelled from Tara by Cormac mac Airt and killed in Munster by Cormac's poet Ferches mac Commáin. Fergus and his two brothers, Fergus Caisfhiachlach ("rough-tooth") and Fergus Foltlebair ("long-hair"), then expelled Cormac to Connacht and Fergus took the throne. He ruled for a year, before he was defeated by Cormac, with the assistance of Tadg mac Céin and Lugaid Láma, in the Battle of Crinna.

The Lebor Gabála Érenn makes no reference to Fergus' descent. Geoffrey Keating gives him a long genealogy, naming his father as Finnchad, son of Ogaman, son of the former High King and king of the Ulaid Fíatach Finn. The Annals of the Four Masters name Fergus' father as Imchad, but traces his descent no further.

The Lebor Gabála synchronises Lugaid's reign with that of the Roman emperor Commodus (180–192). The chronology of Keating's Foras Feasa ar Éirinn dates his reign to 203–204, that of the Annals of the Four Masters to 225–226.

| Preceded by Lugaid mac Con | High King of Ireland; LGE late 2nd century FFE 203–204; AFM 225–226 | Succeeded by Cormac mac Airt |
