= Ailill Flann Bec =

Irish dynast

Ailill Flann Bec, son of Fiachu Muillethan, was an Irish dynast belonging to the Deirgtine, the proto-historical ancestors of the historical Eóganachta dynasties of Munster. He was the father of Luigthech, also known as Lugaid, and thus the grandfather of Conall Corc. Another son of Ailill Flann Bec may have been Dáire Cerbba, but there is evidence against this.

He was adopted by and succeeded his elder brother Ailill Flann Mór, who left no issue.
