= Bodleian Library, MS Rawlinson B 502 =

Medieval Irish manuscript

Rawlinson B 502
- Oxford, Bodleian Library, Rawlinson MS B 502
- Also known as: The Book of Glendalough, Saltair na Rann by Óengus Céile Dé (pt 2)
- Type: codex, two miscellanies
- Date: c. 1100 (pt 1); mid-12th century (pt 2)
- Place of origin: a Leinster monastery
- Language(s): Middle Irish, Latin
- Scribe(s): two scribes (pt 1); one scribe (pt 2)
- Material: vellum
- Size: 175 folios on vellum and paper, including the binder's leaves
- Format: double columns
- Script: Irish minuscule
- Additions: glosses; additions by Ware

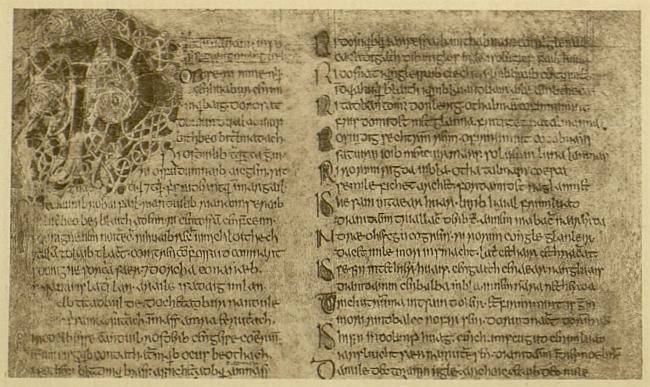
Frontispiece from The Poem-Book of the Gael depicting a page from Bodleian Library, MS Rawlinson B 502

Oxford, Bodleian Library, Rawlinson B 502 is a medieval Irish manuscript which currently resides in the Bodleian Library, Oxford. It ranks as one of the three major surviving Irish manuscripts to have been produced in pre-Norman Ireland, the two other works being Lebor na hUidre and the Book of Leinster. Some scholars have also called it the Book of Glendalough, in Irish Lebar Glinne Dá Locha, after several allusions in medieval and early modern sources to a manuscript of that name. However, there is currently no agreement as to whether Rawlinson B 502, more precisely its second part, is to be identified as the manuscript referred to by that title.

It was described by Brian Ó Cuív as one of the "most important and most beautiful ... undoubtedly the most magnificent" of the surviving medieval Irish manuscripts. Pádraig Ó Riain states ".. a rich, as yet largely unworked, source of information on the concerns of the community at Glendalough in or about the year 1131, and a magnificent witness, as yet barely interrogated, to the high standard of scholarship attained by this monastic centre."

== History and structure ==
According to Robert Anthony Welch, it was compiled from around 1125–30. The manuscript as it exists today consists of two vellum codices which were originally separate works but were bound together sometime before 1648. This was done at the request of their new owner, Irish antiquarian Sir James Ware (died 1666), who thanks to Dubhaltach Mac Fhirbhisigh (died 1671) had been able to assemble a fine collection of Irish manuscripts. Several leaves of paper with a (mainly) Latin commentary by Ware on aspects of Irish history (fos. 13–18) were inserted between the two manuscripts, possibly to preserve the appearance of two distinct works. Further paper folios were added at the end of the second manuscript (fos. 90–103), containing notes and transcripts of documents, part of which was written in Latin.

The first manuscript, which covers folios 1–12v (six bifolia), was compiled and written in the late 11th century or possibly at the beginning of the 12th. The fine minuscule script suggests the work of two professional scribes, and glosses were added by later hands. One of these glossators has been identified as the scribe "H" who was also responsible for adding glosses to Lebor na hUidre. Like the latter work, this part of Rawlinson B 502 may therefore have been a product of the monastic scriptorium of Clonmacnoise, County Offaly.

The greater part of Rawlinson B 502, covering fos. 19–89, is taken up by a manuscript the text of which was written by a single scribe in the mid-12th century. The last king of Connacht listed is Tairrdelbach Ua Conchobair (r. 1106–1156).

Every leaf has two columns of text written in regular minuscule. The calligraphy, with some decoration, is of a high standard. The parchment was well prepared, though the manuscript has been subject to wear and tear and several folios are now lost. The contents of the manuscript point towards a monastic milieu in Leinster as the source of its origin. It has been proposed that Killeshin in County Laois was the house responsible for its production.

James Ware's collection of manuscripts passed on to his son, who sold it to the Earl of Clarendon. It was later transferred to James Brydges, 1st Duke of Chandos, who sold some of the manuscripts, including that known now as Rawlinson B 502, to Dr Richard Rawlinson (died 1755). Rawlinson's collection of manuscripts was bequeathed to St John's College, Oxford, whence in 1756 it finally found its way into the Bodleian Library.

In 1909, Kuno Meyer published a collotype facsimile edition of the vellum pages, with an introduction and indices, published by Clarendon Press. By 2000, the Early Manuscripts at Oxford University project was launched, now entrusted to the Oxford Digital Library, which published digital reproductions of the manuscript. The scanned images include both vellum and paper leaves, with the exception of the 17th-century paper leaves found on fos. 105–171. Critical editions and translations of the individual texts, insofar as these have been undertaken, have been published separately in books and academic journals.

== Contents ==
The first manuscript contains an acephalous copy of the Annals of Tigernach, preserving a fragment of the so-called Chronicle of Ireland, a world history in Latin and Irish based on Latin historians such as Eusebius and Orosius. The text is incomplete at both its beginning and end, which suggests that the twelve folios may represent only a portion of the original manuscript.

The second manuscript opens with a series of Middle Irish religious poems entitled Saltair na Rann ("The Psalter of the Verses"), followed by a recension of the Irish Sex Aetates Mundi ("The Six Ages of the World") and the poem Amra Coluimb Chille ("Song for Columkille / Columba"). The manuscript contains many Leinster narratives belonging to the Cycles of the Kings, some of which are grouped in a section which is headed Scélshenchas Laigen, beginning with Orgain Denna Ríg. Among these is Tairired na n'Déssi, the best preserved copy of the "A" version of the work known as The Expulsion of the Déisi. Another secular group of Leinster texts, but written in verse, is the selection of poems collectively referred to as the Laídshenchas Laigen. Other verse texts include the wisdom poems Immacallam in Dá Thuarad ("The Colloquy of the Two Sages") and the legal instructional dialogue Gúbretha Caratniad ("False judgments of Caratnia"). The manuscript is also one of two pre-Norman sources for Irish genealogical texts, the other being the Book of Leinster. These genealogies, which come at the end in a sizeable section of some 30 folios, are mainly associated with Leinster, but others are integrated. Importantly, some material of early Irish law is preserved, such as the tract Cóic Conara Fugill ("The Five Paths of Judgment"). For a select but more detailed list of the contents of the manuscript, expand the following table:

Folios	Pages (facsimile)	Texts
f. 1r-12v		Annals of Tigernach (Irish World Chronicle)
f. 13-8		Paper leaves containing historical notes by Ware
f. 19r-40		Saltair na Rann ("The Psalter of Verses")
f. 40v-44v		Sex Aetates Mundi (The Six Stages of the World)
f. 45r		Poem ascribed to Mac Cosse, beginning Ro fessa hi curp domuin dúir
f. 46r		Poem Fichi rig cia rim as ferr, text on kings who ruled Jerusalem, beginning with King Saul and ending with the destruction of Jerusalem by Nabcodon
f. 46r		Religious poem A Dé dúlig adateoch / Cethrur do-raega ní dalb
f. 46v		Religious poem Ro chuala crecha is tir thair
f. 46v		Text beginning Ad fet Augustus míl do bith i fudumnaib in mara ⁊ in talman Indecdai, note on monster in India.
f. 46		Poem beginning Cenn ard Ádaim étrocht rád; annal for 1454
f. 47r	p. 81a-b	Orcuin Néill Noígíallaig (The Death of Níall Noígíallach)
f. 47r-v	p. 81b-82a	Gein Branduib meic Echach ⁊ Aedáin meic Gabráin (The Birth of Brandub son of Eochu and of Aedán son of Gabrán)
f. 47v	p. 82a-b	Aided Maelodráin (The Death of Maelodrán)
f. 47v		heading announcing Laidsenchas Lagen (fos. 47v-50v)
f. 47v		Poem Is mo chen a Labraid lain, dialogue between Scoriath, Labraid Loingsech and Moriath
f. 47v		Poem Cethri m. Airtt Mis Telmann
f. 47v		Poem Ochtur Criathar cid dia ta
f. 47v	p. 82b-83a	Orgguin trí mac Diarmata meic Cerbaill. Cf. p. 134b.
f. 48r		Poem Coic rig trichat do Laignib, on kings of Leinster who ruled early Ireland
f. 48r		Poem Secht rig do Laignib na lerg, further kings of Leinster
f. 48r		Poem Dia ngaba apgitir Lagen, on Leinster warriors
f. 48r		Poem Fedeilmid athair Echach, on battle fought by the Fothairt against the men of Munster
f. 48r		Poem Fothairt for clannaib Concorb, on expulsion of the Fothairt from Tara
f. 48v		Poem Clanna Bresail Bricc builid, on Leinster dynasties
f. 48v		Poem Coic rig trichat triallsat roe, on Christian kings of Leinster
f. 49r		Poem attributed to Dubthach hua Lugair, Crimthann clothri coicid hErenn
f. 49v		Poem Ro batar laeich do Laigneib, on the birth of Brandub mac Echach, king of Leinster, and Áedán mac Gabráin, king of Dál Riada
f. 50r	p. 87a-88a	Poem Cathair cenn coicid Banba, the metrical Esnada Tige Buchet ("The Songs of Buchet's House"). Cf. f. 73.
f. 50v	p. 88a	Poem Do chomramaib Laigen (or Eol dam i ndairib drechta), ascribed to Flann mac Máel Máedóc; on battles fought by Leinster heroes.
f. 50v		Poem A choicid choem Chairpri chruaid
chasm		leaf or leaves missing
f. 51r		Genealogies of Irish saints
f. 52v		Alphabetically arranged list of saints bearing the same name
f. 54r		Poem ascribed to Dallán Forgaill, Amrae Coluimb Chille ("A Poem for Colum Cille")
f. 59v		Prayer "Adomnan mac Ronain ro cháchain in nothainseo", beginning Colum Cilli co Dia dommerail i tias nimustias.
f. 59v		Poem attributed to Columba, Dia ard árlethar
f. 59v		Mac Lesc mac Ladain Aithech, about Mac Lesc mac Ladain and Finn, both of whom utter a number of verses
f. 60r		Poem "Cainnech do rigni in northainse"
f. 60r-62v	p. 107b-112b	Immacallam in Dá Thuarad ("The Colloquy of the Two Sages")
f. 62v		Gúbretha Caratniad ("The False Judgments of Caratnia")
f. 63v		Cóic Conara Fugill ("The Five Paths of Judgment"), legal text
f. 64r		Genealogies of the Laigin
f. 65v		Story of Labraid Loingsech and other pre-Christian kings of Leinster, including poems: Dind Rig attributed to Ferchertne; Lug sceith; Cethri meic la Setna Sithbacc, attributed to Senchán; etc.
f. 65v		Laigin genealogies, descendants of Cú Corb
f. 66v		Laigin genealogies (Dál Niad Cuirp). Includes verse.
f. 67r		Miniugud senchasa mac nairegda Cathair, Laigin genealogies
f. 68v		Laigin genealogies (Dál Niad Cuirp).
chasm		lacuna
f. 69r		Laigin genealogies (continued)
f. 69r		Laigin genealogies and section on Fothairt
f. 69v		Genealogies, De peritia ⁊ genelogia Loichsi, on Lugaid Loígsech and genealogies of Loíchse
f. 70v		Genealogies, Duil laechsluinte Lagen
f. 70v		Osraige(Ossory) genealogies
f. 71v		Heading Scelshenchas Laigen, announcing items folios 71v-73v
f. 71v-72r	p. 130b-131b	Orgain Denna Ríg (The Destruction of Dind Ríg)
f. 72r	p. 131b-133b	Tairired na n-Déssi (The Expulsion of the Déisi)
f. 73r-73v	p. 133b-134a	prose Esnada Tige Buchet (The Songs of Buchet's House). Cf. f. 50.
f. 73v	p. 134a	Comram na Clóenferta (The Triumph of the Sloping Mound)
f. 73v-74v	p. 134b	Orgguin trí mac Diarmata meic Cerbaill (The Deaths of the Three Sons of Diarmait mac Cerbaill). Cf. p. 82b-83a.
chasm		
f. 74r		Text on pre-Christian kings of Ireland, beginning Do rochair tra Sirna Sirsaeglach mac Dein m. Demail la Rothechtaid Rotha mac Moen
f. 74v		List of kings of Ireland, from the age of Míl up to Brian Bóraime
f. 75r		Miniugud na Croeb Coibnesta, on descendants of Éremón up to the time of Eochaid Mugmedón's sons
	p. 138a	Echtra mac Echdach Mugmedóin (The Adventures of the Sons of Eochaid Mugmedón)
		Leinster and other genealogies
f. 90–103		paper leaves (17th century)

== Disputed identity ==
The identity of the second part of the manuscript, more especially its name and provenance, in sources long before it passed into the hands of Rawlinson has been a matter of some controversy.

=== Saltair na Rann ===
Sir James Ware himself referred to the second part as the Saltair na Rann by Óengus Céile Dé, after the metrical religious work of this name beginning on the first folio (fo. 19): "Oengus Celide, Author antiquus, qui in libro dicto Psalter-narran" and elsewhere, "vulgo Psalter Narran appellatur" ("commonly called Psalter Narran"). Ware’s contemporaries John Colgan (died 1658) and Geoffrey Keating (died 1644) also appear to have used this name for the manuscript as a whole. Keating refers to this title three times throughout his Foras Feasa ar Éirinn, citing it as his source for the poem beginning Uí Néill uile ar cúl Choluim in Book III. Complicating matters, this poem is not found in Rawlinson B 502, though Breatnach draws attention to the loss of folios and the trimming of pages which may account for the poem's absence.

It is unknown whether in using the name "the Saltair na Rann by Óengus Céile Dé", these three writers were following a convention which significantly predated the 17th century. Caoimhín Breatnach assumes that they did, but Pádraig Ó Riain has expressed serious reservations, suggesting instead that the title may have been a convenient shorthand introduced by Ware in the 1630s and adopted by some of his contemporaries.

=== Lebar Glinne Dá Locha or Book of Glendalough ===
A case has been made for identifying Rawlinson B 502 (second part) as the manuscript referred to in some sources as the Lebar Glinne Dá Locha or Book of Glendalough. (To make confusion worse confounded, the latter title was once mistakenly used for the Book of Leinster, too, but see there). References to this title in the manuscripts include:

- Excerpts from Sex Aetates Mundi, in NLI G 3 (fos. 22va and 23r), which twice cite the Book of Glendalough as its source.
- The Irish poem Cia lín don rígraid ráin ruaid as preserved in RIA MS 23 D 17
- A scribal note to a genealogical text in the 14th-century Great Book of Lecan, which indicates that the pedigree has been following the Book of Glendalough up that point and will be proceed with the version known from the Book of Nuachongbháil, i.e. the Book of Leinster.
- In Keating's Foras Feasa ar Éirinn, a list of Irish manuscripts said to have survived into his own time.

The case for identification was made by scholars like Eugene O'Curry (1861) and James Carney (1964), but it has been argued most forcefully and elaborately by Pádraig Ó Riain. He observed close textual affinities between copies of texts which acknowledge their source as being the Book of Glendalough, such as the first two items above, and versions of these texts in Rawlinson B 502. Caoimhín Breatnach, however, criticises his methodology in establishing textual relationships and concludes that Lebar Glinne Dá Locha and Rawlinson B 502 are two separate manuscripts.

An important item of evidence is the poem Cia lín don rígraid ráin ruaid, which survives in three manuscripts: Rawlinson B 502, RIA MS 23 D 17 (which attributes its copy to the Book of Glendalough) and National Library of Ireland MS G 3. In Rawlinson B 502, the poem is embedded in a section on pious kings and accompanied by a short prose introduction as well as some marginal notes. In the versions of the poem given by MS G 3 and MS 23 D 17, the scribe explicitly cites the Lebar Glinne Dá Locha as his source, but the thematic context and the accompanying texts of the Rawlinson B 502 version are found in neither of them. Breatnach suggests that these shared differences are unlikely to have occurred independent of one another, but probably derive from a common source known to both scribes as the Lebar Glinne Dá Locha.

Breatnach also points out that Geoffrey Keating, in a list of extant manuscripts known to him, distinguishes between the Saltair na Rann by Óengus Céile Dé, i.e. Rawlinson B 502 (second part), and the Book of Glendalough. Ó Riain objects, however, that Keating does not claim to have witnessed all these manuscripts in person and so might not have been aware that the manuscript he used, at least by the time he wrote Book III, was formerly known as the Book of Glendalough.

== Diplomatic edition and digital reproduction ==
- Meyer, Kuno, ed. (1909). Rawlinson B 502: A Collection of Pieces in Prose and Verse in the Irish Language compiled during the Eleventh and Twelfth Centuries now published in Facsimile from the Original Manuscript in the Bodleian Library. Oxford: Clarendon. Diplomatic edition
- "Bodleian Library: MS. Rawl. B. 502". Early Manuscripts at Oxford University. Oxford University. 2000.
- , In Irish. Published by UCC CELT (Corpus of Electronic Texts Edition).
