= Fedlimid Rechtmar =

Legendary high king of Ireland

Fedlimid Rechtmar (Old Irish: [ˈfʲeðʲlʲimʲiðʲ ˈrʲext̪β̃əɾ]; "the lawful, legitimate" or "the passionate, furious") or Rechtaid ("the judge, lawgiver"), son of Tuathal Techtmar, was, according to medieval Irish legend and historical tradition, a High King of Ireland. His mother was Báine, daughter of Scál. He took power after killing his predecessor, and his father's killer, Mal mac Rochride.

The chronology of Geoffrey Keating's Foras Feasa ar Éirinn dates his reign to 104–113, that of the Annals of the Four Masters to 110–119. The Lebor Gabála Érenn synchronises his reign with that of the Roman emperor Marcus Aurelius (161–180). He ruled for nine or ten years before dying in his bed, and was succeeded by Cathair Mór. One of his sons, Conn Cétchathach, would succeed Cathair. Two other sons, Fiacha Suighe, ancestor of the Dal Fiachrach Suighe, and Eochaid Finn, are named in medieval sources.

He is said to have instituted the principle of an eye for an eye into Irish law, after which the behaviour of the Irish improved.

The completion of the road construction around Tara is attributed to him.

== Family tree ==
Fíachu Finnolach	Eithne Imgel
Tuathal Techtmar	Baine
Fedlimid Rechtmar
Conn Cétchathach	Eochaid Finn	Fiachra Suighe
Dal Fiachrach Suighe
Art mac Cuinn	Achtan	Macnia mac Lugdach	Saruit	Ailill Aulom	Sadb	Conaire Cóem
Lugaid mac Con
Uí Néill	Connachta	Eóganachta	Dál Riata

Royal titles
Preceded by Mal mac Rochride	High King of Ireland; LGE 2nd century AD; FFE AD 104–113; AFM AD 110–119	Succeeded by Cathair Mór
