= Fothairt =

Medieval Irish population-group

The Fothairt were a Medieval Irish people based in Leinster.

== Peoples ==
The Fothairt are referenced in Leabhar Ua Maine. Their genealogies are preserved in Leabhar na nGenealach, the Great Book of Lecan, Bodleian Library, MS Rawlinson B 502, and/or Bodleian Library, MS Rawlinson B 512.

- Fothairt in Chairn - located in the barony of Forth, County Wexford.
- Fothairt Mag Fea - located in the barony of Forth, County Carlow.
- Fotharta Fer Cúl - located in Magh Brega, Co. Meath.
- Fotharta Airthir Liphe - located along the banks of the east Liffey.
- Fotharta Airbrech fri Brí Ele aniar - bordering the Kingdom of Uí Failghe, near Croghan Hill (Brí Eile).
- Fotharta Bile, alias Fotharta File -
- Fotharta Fea - See Fothairt Mag Fea
- Fotharta Tuile -
- Fotharta Imchlair (or in cláir) - Clan Corpri, around Donaghmore, County Tyrone and near Armagh, County Armagh
- Fothar Breg, alias Fothar Mac nDeichill of Brega
- Fotharta Maige Itha - around Lough Swilly in County Donegal, who were divided into the following seven Aicme or tribes: Ui Deaga, Ui Setna, Ui Dimai, Ui Eircc, Ui Chormaic, Ui Niath and Ui Duirrtheacht.

== History ==
Dáibhí Ó Cróinín writes that "The Fothairt were the original population group around the site of Bridgit's monastery at Kildare" (p. 197), further stating that the Uí Ercáin, a branch of the Uí Meic Cruaich (a sub-sept of the Fothairt) "are remembered in the 'Vita Tripartia' as having been specially favoured by Patrick, who blessed them (Dobert Pátraic bendachtain ... for Uu hErcá huili) and their king, Fergnae mac Cobthaig, who is also mentioned in the life of Fintan/Munnu of Tagmon, where he encounters the saint in campo Lyffi ('in the Liffy plain')." (p. 197).

The kingship of Leinster was held from the mid-8th century to 1042 by the Uí Dúnlainge, who bolstered their early gains "by means of political marriage with Sárnat, daughter of Eochu mac Baíth of the Fothairt" (p. 197). A branch of the Forthairt, the Uí Brigti, explicitly claimed a connection with Bridgit (p. 198). In addition, two kings of Forthairt, Fergus mac Móenaig and Dub dá Chrich mac aui Cellaig mec Triein, "as well as 'many others, omitted for the sake of brevity'", were killed at the battle of Ath Senaig (Ballyshannon, near Kilcullen, County Kildare) in 738 as supporters of King Áed of Leinster (p. 200).

Despite their political eclipse, the Fothairt "continued to supply leading clergy to Kildare. To Ui Chúlduib ... belonged the two abbesses, Muirenn (d. 918) and Eithne (d. 1016); to the obscure Forthair Airbrech belonged the earlier abess, Sebdann (d. 732) and another Kildare ecclesiastic (d. 750); while two further abbesses, Coblaith (d. 916) and Muirenn (d. 964), belonged to an ecclesiastical branch of Forthairt Fea. And it is highly probable that many other Kildare clerics, whose origins cannot be established with certainty, belonged to Fotharta." (p. 586, NHI) Indeed, the Uí Ercáin were noted in the 'Tripartite Life' as being blessed by Saint Patrick, who promised them that not only would they never be subjects of an "outside" king, but that "they [would] have their own brithemnas, capacity of judging and being judged, in their own territory. *(p. 873, NHI)

== Annalistic references ==
All quotes from the Annals of the Four Masters, unless otherwise stated.

- 284: After Cairbre Liffeachair had been seventeen years in the sovereignty of Ireland, he fell in the battle of Gabhra Aichle, by the hand of Semeon, son of Cearb, one of the Fotharta.
- 663: Cearnach Sotal, son of Diarmaid, son of Aedh Slaine, died, together with the aforesaid persons, of a mortality which arose in Ireland, on the Calends of the August of this year, in Magh Itha, in Fotharta.
- 733: Fearghus, son of Maenach, and Dubhdacrich [mac h-úi Cellaigh, maic Trena], two lords of Fotharta, fell at the battle of Ath Seanaith.
- 749/54: The devastation of Fotharta Fea (Fothairt Fedha) by the men of Osraighe (Ossory).
- 813: Ainbhcheallach, son of Daelghus, lord of Ui Fothaidh Tire, died.
- 845/47: Cathal, son of Cosgrach, lord of Fotharta, was slain by the Ui Neill.
- 849: Flannchadh, son of Aenghus, lord of Ui Fothadh Tire, died.
- 854: Dunlang, son of Dubhduin, lord of Fotharta Tire, died.
- 863: Colman, son of Dunlang, lord of Fotharta Tire, was slain by his own children.
- 897: Fogartach, son of Flann, Abbot of Laithreach Briuin, and lord of Fotharta Airthir Life, died.
- 937: Oillill mic Aengusa, tighearna Ua Fothaidh.
- 966: Ruaidhri, mac Maol Martain, tigherna Fothart, was slain.
- 1017: Muiredhach, mac Muirchertaigh, tigherna Fothart, was slain.
- 1018: Ruaidhri, mac Faoláin, tigherna Fothart, was slain.
- 1022: Domhnall, mac Ceallaigh, flaith Fothart, was slain.
- 1133: Eochaidh Ua Nualláin, tigherna Fothart.
- 1141: Creach-shluaighedh lá Toirrdhealbhach Ua Conchobhair i f-Fothartaibh Airbhreach, & ro oircc dream d'Feraibh Midhe, & d'Fhothartaibh, & regles h-Uí Dhúnáin.
