= Mug Nuadat =

Irish mythological king

In Irish mythological history Mug Nuadat (servant of Nuada) son of Mug Neit, son of Derg, son of Dergthene, son of Enna Munchain, son of Loch Mor, son of Muiredach Mucna, son of Eochaid Garb, son of Dui Dalta Dedad was a legendary, supposed King of Munster in the 2nd century AD. He was, according to later medieval tradition, a rival of the High King, Conn of the Hundred Battles, and for a time after the year 123 was the de facto ruler of the southern half of Ireland. Everything south of a line drawn between Galway Bay and Dublin was known as Leth Moga ("Mug's half") (Modern Irish: Leath Mhogha), and everything north of that line was Leth Cuinn ("Conn's half") (Modern Irish: Leath Chuinn).

Conn later invaded Leth Moga and drove Mug from Ireland. He took refuge in Spain and returned with an army, but was defeated and killed by Conn at Mag Léna. (In some versions, Conn treacherously kills Mug in his bed.)

Mug's son was Ailill Ollamh. His grandson Éogan Mór fought alongside Conn's son Art at the Battle of Maigh Mucruimhe, and is credited with founding the Eóganachta dynasty.

T.F. O'Rahilly speculated that Mug Nuadat may have been the god Nuada rather than an actual historical person. Equally it could be that Éogan Mór was the earthly representation of the god.

John O'Hart calls Mug Nuadat, Eoghan Mor [Owen Mor], or Eugene the Great. Then he further goes on to say that this Eugene was commonly called "Mogha Nuadhad," and was a wise and politic prince and great warrior. From him Magh-Nuadhad (now "Maynooth") is so called.

== See also ==
- Deirgtine
- Nia Segamain
