= Cycles of the Kings =

Body of Old and Middle Irish literature

The Cycles of the Kings or Kings' Cycles, sometimes called the Historical Cycle, are a body of Old and Middle Irish literature. They comprise legends about historical and semi-historical kings of Ireland (such as Buile Shuibhne, "The Madness of King Suibhne"), stories about the origins of dynasties and peoples (such as The Expulsion of the Déisi), accounts of significant battles (such as Battle of Mag Mucrama), as well as anecdotes that explain rites and customs. It is one of the four main groupings of early Irish sagas, along with the Mythological Cycle, the Ulster Cycle and the Fianna Cycle.

The kings that are included range from the almost entirely fictional Labraid Loingsech, who allegedly became High King in the 4th century BC, to the entirely historical Brian Boru. Other kings include Cormac mac Airt, Niall of the Nine Hostages, Conall Corc, Diarmait mac Cerbaill, Lugaid mac Con, Conn of the Hundred Battles, Lóegaire mac Néill and Crimthann mac Fidaig. It was part of the duty of the medieval Irish bards, or court poets, to record the history of the family and the genealogy of the king they served. This they did in poems that blended the mythological and the historical to a greater or lesser degree.

One of the most famous legends is the Buile Shuibhne, a 12th-century tale told in verse and prose. Suibhne, king of Dál nAraidi, was cursed by St Ronan Finn and became a kind of half-man, half-bird, condemned to live out his life in the woods, fleeing from his human companions. The story has captured the imaginations of contemporary Irish poets and has been translated by Trevor Joyce and Seamus Heaney.
