= Medb Lethderg =

Irish goddess

In Irish mythology, Medb Lethderg (Old Irish pronunciation: [ˌmʲeðβ ˈlʲeθðʲeɾɡ]; Modern Irish: Méabh Leathdhearg [ˌmʲeːw ˈlʲaˌjaɾˠəɡ]; "red-side") was a goddess of sovereignty associated with Tara. She was the wife or lover of nine successive kings, including Fedlimid Rechtmar, Art mac Cuinn, and Cormac mac Airt. She is associated with Rath Meave, south of the Hill of Tara.

She has been identified with or considered the inspiration for Medb of the Connachta in the Ulster Cycle.

The poem "Macc Moga Corbb celas clú" in the Book of Leinster is ascribed to her.

== Sources ==
- Byrne, Francis John (2001). Irish Kings and High-Kings (2nd ed.). Four Courts Press.
