= Sadb ingen Chuinn =

Semi-legendary Irish Princess

Sadb ingen Chuinn was a daughter of Conn of the Hundred Battles, a High King of Ireland. She married firstly Macnia mac Lugdach, prince of the Dáirine or Corcu Loígde, and was mother of Lugaid Mac Con, High King of Ireland. Upon the death of Macnia, she married secondly Ailill Aulom, king of southern Ireland, and was mother of Éogan Mór, ancestor of the Eóganachta. Her brother was Art mac Cuinn, also a High King of Ireland, while her sister Sáruit married Conaire Cóem of the Érainn, who was High King before him.

The traditions vary. Alternatively, as in the Cath Maige Mucrama, she was the wife only of Ailill Aulom and mother of Éogan Mór, Cormac Cas, Cian, and Lugaid Mac Con's foster-mother.

In the Cath Maige Léna, an Early Modern tale, Sadb is actually Mac Con's wife, although he is called Mac Nia and possibly confused with his father or grandfather.

Regardless, in historical times, she was chiefly remembered as an ancestor of the Eóganachta dynasties.

Possibly referred to in the Acallam na Senórach, Sadb is described as "one of the four best women that man ever lay with".

Sadhbh, mother of Oisín and wife of Fionn mac Cumhaill, is a separate figure.
