= Conn of the Hundred Battles =

Legendary high king of Ireland

Conn Cétchathach (pronounced [kon̪ ˈkʲeːd̪xaθəx]), or Conn of the Hundred Battles, son of Fedlimid Rechtmar, was a legendary High King of Ireland who is claimed to be the ancestor of the Connachta, and through his descendant Niall Noígiallach, the Uí Néill dynasties, which dominated Ireland in the early Middle Ages.

== Literary tradition ==
=== Early life and accession ===
The Annals of the Four Masters says that five roads to Tara, which had never been seen before, were discovered on the night of Conn's birth. According to the Lebor Gabála Érenn, he took power after killing his predecessor Cathair Mór. In other sources his predecessor is Dáire Doimthech. The Lia Fáil, the coronation stone at Tara which was said to roar when the rightful king stood on it, roared under Conn for the first time since Cúchulainn split it with his sword when it failed to roar for Lugaid Riab nDerg.

In the saga Baile in Scáil ("The Phantom's Ecstatic Vision"), Conn treads on the stone by accident while walking the ramparts of Tara, implying that the stone had been lost and half-buried since Cúchulainn's time. A druid explains the meaning of the stone, and says the number of cries the stone made is the number of kings who will follow Conn, but he is not the man to name them. A magical mist arises, and a horseman approaches who throws three spears towards Conn, then asks him and the druid to follow him to his house, which stands on a plain by a golden tree. They enter and are welcomed by a woman in a gold crown. First they see a silver vat, bound with gold hoops, full of red ale, and a golden cup and serving spoon. Then they see a phantom, a tall beautiful man, on a throne, who introduces himself as Lugh. The woman is the sovereignty of Ireland, and she serves Conn a meal consisting of an ox's rib 24 feet long (10 m approximately), and a boar's rib. (Note: Here, the Irish foot is traig.) When she serves drinks, she asks "To whom shall this cup be given?", and Lugh recites a poem which tells Conn how many years he will reign, and the names of the kings who will follow him. Then they enter Lugh's shadow, and the house disappears, but the cup and serving spoon remain.

An earlier text, Baile Chuinn Cétchathaigh ("The Ecstatic Vision of Conn of the Hundred Battles") gives a poetic list of kings, many of which are recognisable from the traditional List of High Kings of Ireland, but without narrative context.

=== Reign ===
Conn had a long reign – twenty, twenty-five, thirty-five or even fifty years according to different versions of the Lebor Gabála, spending much of it at war with Mug Nuadat, king of Munster.

According to the medieval text Cath Maige Leana ("the battle of Mag Leana"), Mug Nuadat's father, Mug Neit son of Deirgtine, had expelled the kings of Munster, Conaire Coem and Mac Niad mac Lugdach. The two kings fled to Conn, and married his daughters, Saraid and Sadb respectively. Mug Neit made war on Conn, but was defeated and killed after two battles in County Offaly. Mug Nuadat led his father's forces in retreat through Munster, fighting Conn to a standstill before escaping by sea to Beare Island (in Irish, Oiléan Béarra, now called Bere Island), and thence to Spain. Conn restored Conaire and Mac Niad to their kingdoms and withdrew.

Nine years later, Mug Nuadat, who had married the daughter of the king of Spain, landed with an army near Bantry Bay and forced Conaire and Mac Niad to submit to his overlordship. With the kings of Ulster and Leinster, he marched north to Mag nAi and forced Conn to make a treaty with him, dividing Ireland between them: Conn controlling the north, or Leth Cuinn ("Conn's half"), and Mug Nuadat the south, or Leth Moga ("Mug's half"), with the border running from Galway in the west to Dublin in the east.

After fifteen years of peace, Mug Nuadat broke the treaty and declared war, along with the kings of Ulster and Leinster. He led his army to Mag Leana, near Tullamore, County Offaly. Conn retreated to Connacht, gathered his forces, and retook Meath from the king of Ulster. He then marched south to Mag Leana and destroyed Mug Nuadat's army in a surprise night attack on his camp. Mug Nuadat was killed in the fighting, and Conn became king of all of Ireland.

Geoffrey Keating tells the story differently. In his account, Mug Nuadat obtains an army from the king of Leinster and expels the kings of Munster, here Lugaid Allathach, Dáire Dornmhor and Aonghus. Aonghus flees to Conn, who gives him an army with which to reclaim his kingdom, but Mug Nuadat defeats this and a further nine attempts by Conn to drive him out of Munster, forcing Conn to divide Ireland with him. When hostilities break out again, Conn and Mug Nuadat's armies gather for battle at Mag Lena, but Conn kills Mug Nuadat in his bed in an early morning attack.

According to a medieval source, the hero Fionn mac Cumhaill was born in Conn's time. His father, Cumhall, a warrior in Conn's service, was a suitor of Muirne, daughter of the druid Tadg mac Nuadat, but Tadg refused his suit, so Cumhall abducted her. Conn went to war against him, and Cumhall was killed by Goll mac Morna in the Battle of Cnucha. But Muirne was already pregnant, and Tadg rejected her, ordering her to be burned. She fled to Conn, and Conn put her under the protection of Cumhall's brother-in-law Fiacal mac Conchinn. It was in Fiacal's house that she gave birth to a son, Deimne, who was later renamed Fionn. When he was ten, Fionn came to Tara put himself into Conn's service. He learned that every year at Samhain, the monster Aillen would put everyone at Tara to sleep with his music, and burn down the palace with his fiery breath. Fionn killed Aillen, having kept himself awake by pressing the head of his spear to his forehead, and warded off Aillen's flame with his magical cloak, and Conn made him head of the fianna in place of Goll.

=== Family ===
Conn had two sons, Connla and Art. Connla fell in love with a fairy woman from Mag Mell, and went with her to her otherworld home in her crystal boat, leaving Art alone. After that Art was known as Óenfer – the "lone" or "solitary". Connla's tale is told in the Echtra Condla.

After Conn's wife Eithne Tháebfhota, daughter of Cathair Mór, died, another fairy woman, Bé Chuille, was banished by the Tuatha Dé Danann to Ireland. She had fallen in love with Art from a distance and sought him out in her currach, but when she met Conn and learned he was without a wife, agreed to marry him instead, on the condition that Art be banished from Tara for a year. The men of Ireland thought this unjust, and Ireland was barren during that year. The druids discovered that this was Bé Chuille's fault, and declared that the famine could be ended by the sacrifice of the son of a sinless couple in front of Tara. Conn went in search of this boy in Bé Chuille's currach. He landed on a strange island of apple trees. The queen of the island had a young son, the result of her only sexual union. Conn told her that Ireland would be saved if the boy bathed in the water of Ireland, and she agreed. He took him back to Ireland, but when the druids demanded his death, he, Art and Fionn mac Cumhaill swore to protect him. Just then, a woman driving a cow carrying two bags approached, and the cow was sacrificed instead of the boy. The bags were opened: one contained a bird with one leg, the other a bird with twelve legs. The two birds fought, and the one-legged bird won. The woman said the twelve-legged bird represented the druids, and the one-legged bird the boy, and revealed herself as his mother. She told Conn that the famine would end if he would put Bé Chuille away, but he refused. Bé Chuille was later banished from Tara as the result of a series of challenges she and Art made each other over a game of fidchell.

=== Death ===
Conn was eventually killed by Tipraite Tírech, king of the Ulaid, on Tuesday 20 October according to Ruaidhrí Ó Flaithbheartaigh in his 'Ogygia: seu Rerum Hibernicarum Chronologia' (1685). The Lebor Gabála, Baile in Scáil, Gilla Cóemáin's poem "Annalad annall uile", Fland Mainistrech's poem "Rig Themra dia tesband tnú" in the Book of Leinster and the Annals all say Tipraite defeated him in battle in Túath Amrois. Keating and the Great Book of Lecan says Tipraite sent fifty warriors dressed as women from Emain Macha to kill him at Tara. "The decision as to Cormac’s sword" says Conn was killed with a sword that once belonged to Cú Chulainn. "Cath Maighe Léna" states that the name of the hill where Conn was killed was Druim Tuirléime. His son-in-law Conaire Cóem succeeded him as High King, and Conn's son Art would later succeed him. The Lebor Gabála synchronises Conn's reign with that of the Roman emperor Marcus Aurelius (161–180). The chronology of Geoffrey Keating's Foras Feasa ar Éirinn dates his reign to 116–136, that of the Annals of the Four Masters to 122–157.

Preceded by Cathair Mór	High King of Ireland; LGE 2nd century AD; FFE AD 116–136; AFM AD 122–157	Succeeded by Conaire Cóem

== Family tree ==
Tuathal Techtmar
Fedlimid Rechtmar	Cathair Mór
Conn Cétchathach	Eithne Tháebfhota
Medb Lethderg	Art mac Cuinn	Achtan	Connla	Macnia mac Lugdach	Sadb	Ailill Aulom	Saruit	Conaire Cóem
Cormac mac Airt	Lugaid mac Con	Éogan Mór	Cormac Cas
Connachta	Uí Néill	*	Uí Maine	Airgíalla	Eoganachta	Dal gCais	*
