= Deirgtine =

The Deirgtine (Deirgthine, Dergtine, Dergthine), Clanna Dergthened or "Descendants of Dego Dergthened" were the proto-historical ancestors of the historical Eóganachta dynasties of Munster. Their origins are unclear but they may have been of fairly recent Gaulish derivation. Some evidence exists for their having been active in Roman Britain.

== History ==
Legendary figures belonging to the Deirgtine include Mug Nuadat, Ailill Aulom, Éogan Mór, and Fiachu Muillethan. Though literary claims were later made that these early figures were rulers of Munster, their descendants did not in fact gain political supremacy over the established Dáirine or Corcu Loígde until the 7th century AD. Among the famous tales from which the Deirgtine are known is the Cath Maige Mucrama.

While kinship is not asserted, the Deirgtine are known to have had a close political relationship with the Déisi of Munster, who may have been their most important early facilitators. The names of several figures from the Deirgtine (Eóganachta) pedigrees are found in ogham inscriptions in the Déisi country of County Waterford.

It is also the case that a number of figures, mythological and historical, later thought to belong to the Deirgtine and listed in the Eóganachta pedigrees did in fact belong to the Érainn, but were adopted as ancestors.

The earliest reliable ancestor of the Eóganachta and actual founder of the dynasties is Conall Corc.

== See also ==
- Nia Segamain
