= Art mac Cuinn =

Legendary High King of Ireland

Art mac Cuinn ("son of Conn"), also known as Art Óenfer (literally "one man", used in the sense of "lone", "solitary", or "only son"), was, according to medieval Irish legend and historical tradition, a High King of Ireland.

== Siblings ==
According to the legend, Echtra Condla, he was not Conn's only son: he had a brother called Connla, who fell in love with a fairy woman, and went with her to Mag Mell, never to be seen again. After that, Art was alone and gained his nickname, Art Óenfer. Geoffrey Keating says he had two brothers, Connla and Crionna, who were killed by their uncle Eochaid Finn.

== Biography ==
Another fairy woman, Bé Chuille/Bechuma, who had been banished to Ireland by the Tuatha Dé Danann, fell in love with Art, but, when she learned his father Conn was still alive and a widower, agreed to marry him instead, on the condition that Art be banished from Tara for a year. The injustice caused famine in Ireland, until Art forced Bé Chuille to leave as a forfeit in a game of fidchell. In another variant of the myth, Bé Chuille places a geis on Art, after he loses at a game of fidchell; under which he must leave Ireland never to return until he can find and rescue the maiden Delbchaem ("Fair Shape"). Art travels to the Land of Wonder, facing untold dangers and is forced to kill Delbchaem's mother a fearsome and supernatural figure, who has been foretold by druids that she would be killed by a suitor of her daughter. When Art and Delbchaem return to Tara, Delbchaem banishes Bé Chuille from the land, returning fertility to the region.

Art succeeded to the High Kingship after his brother-in-law Conaire Cóem was killed by Nemed, son of Sroibcenn, in the battle of Gruitine. He ruled for twenty or thirty years. During his reign, Conaire's sons took revenge against Nemed and his allies, the sons of Ailill Aulom, in the Battle of Cennfebrat in Munster. Ailill's foster-son Lugaid mac Con was wounded in the thigh in the battle, and was exiled from Ireland. He made an alliance with Benne Brit, son of the king of Britain, raised an army of foreigners, and returned to Ireland. He defeated and killed Art in the Battle of Maigh Mucruimhe in Connacht. According to legend, Art was given hospitality by Olc Acha, a local smith, the night before the battle. It had been prophesied that a great dignity would come from Olc's line, and he gave Art his daughter Achtan to sleep with. Art's son Cormac was conceived that night. However, according to Keating, Achtan was Art's official mistress, to whom he paid a dowry of cattle; his wife, and the mother of his other children, was Medb Lethderg.

The Lebor Gabála Érenn synchronises Art's reign with that of the Roman emperor Commodus (180–192). The chronology of Keating's Foras Feasa ar Éirinn dates his reign to 143–173, that of the Annals of the Four Masters to 165–195.

Fedlimid Rechtmar	Cathaír Mór
Conn Cétchathach	Eithne Táebfada
Medb Lethderg	Art mac Cuinn	Achtan	Saruit	Macnia mac Lugdach	Sadb	Conaire Cóem
Cormac mac Airt	Eithne Ollamda	Lugaid mac Con
Cairbre Lifechair	Diarmuid Ua Duibhne	Gráinne	Fionn mac Cumhaill	Aillbe
Connachta	Uí Néill	Airgíalla	Colla Da Chrioch	Uí Maine

Preceded by Conaire Cóem	High King of Ireland; LGE 2nd century AD; FFE AD 143–173; AFM AD 165–195	Succeeded by Lugaid mac Con
