= Éogan Mór =

2nd or 3rd century king of Ireland in the Ulster Cycle

In Irish traditional history Éogan (or Eoghan Mór—a name also used by his grandfather, Mug Nuadat), eldest son of Ailill Ollamh, was a 2nd or 3rd century AD king of Munster. He ruled for either fifteen or seventeen years, though fifteen is the number most often given. He is credited with founding or at least giving his name to the Eóganachta, a dynasty which ruled as kings of Munster and later princes of Desmond until the late 16th century. He died at the battle of Maige Mucrama at the hands of his stepbrother, Lugaid Mac Con, which story is told in the Cath Maige Mucrama. The son of Eógan Mór was Fiachu Muillethan. His mother was Sadb ingen Chuinn, daughter of Conn of the Hundred Battles.

== Family ==
Éogan was the stepbrother of Lugaid, also known as Mac Con. He was the father of Fiacha Muillethan, and in order to conceive his son, he slept with Moncha, the daughter of Dil the night before Maige Mucrama so that he would have an heir before he died.

According to the Book of Leinster, Éogan was his father Alill's favorite son. Excerpt from the book of Leister, translated by John Mac Neill.

My son was slain and my six sons; dearer to me my son than my seven sons.

Mug Corb and Dubmercon, Dichorb, tall Eocho, they were brave and hardy, Lugaid and Tadg.

Dearer to me Eogan than they, though they were many; he was the marrow of my bones, he was the heart's vein.

The modern irish clans that trace their genealogy back to Éogan Mór are the Clancarthy Mores, the Mac Carthys, the O Sullivans, O Ciarmhaics and the O Bryens.

== Involvement in Cath Maige Mucrama ==
Éogan Mór is also featured in the Cath Maige Mucrama, an early middle Irish tale which forms part of the cycle of the kings This story is found in the book of Leister which is dated to the 12th century. It is considered to be Irish traditional history.

One day, Mac Conn and Éogan Mór are walking together past the sidh-mound near Áne Chlíah so they can meet Art Mac Cuinn, when they see a man in a yew tree who is playing beautiful music. The two men begin to fight over the musician, both arguing for the right to take him back to their own court. This musician is, however, the son of Éogabul, Fer Fí, whose name means man of poison. The two men bring Fer Fí back to Ailill Aulom so that he can make the final decision on which one will keep the musician. Ailill asks Fer Fí to play his music, and Fer Fí does, playing beautiful music that evokes sadness, joy, laughter, and drowsiness in turn, and then when the court all yields to sleep by the manner of his music, he promptly takes his leave. As the two brothers awake, they nonetheless still demand that Ailill Aulom lay down a judgment, to which he remarks “small advantage” (bec torbai).

However he still attempts to judge which brother deserves the musician, and asks them both what the first thing they each said upon meeting the musician was. "'The music is mine (lemm a ceol),' replies Mac Con; 'mine the musician (lemm in céoluid),' replies Éogan.” AIlill then gives Fer Fí to Éogan, despite the lack of the musician's presence. When Mac Conn protests, Eogan tells him that he has no right to argue, as he is a non-noble. Mac Con is dissatisfied by this and challenges Éogan to a battle at Cenn Abrat, which battle is only recounted in one text. The battle was fought a month later, and Éogan and his allies reigned victorious, although Mac Con did not show up at all, due to his inferior standing. His jester instead, took his place.

In the battle of Cenn Abrat, Éogan wounded Mac Con, and thus won the war, since a high king of Ireland cannot remain king while bearing physical ailments. The credit for defeating Mac Conn is claimed by three people- Éogan Mór, Cairpre Musc, and this Gnathal,ancestor of the Muscraighe Mittene.

== See also ==
- Deirgtine
- Leath Cuinn and Leath Moga
- Annals of the four masters
