= Cathair Mór =

Legendary Irish king

Cathair Mór ("the great"), son of Feidhlimidh Fiorurghlas, a descendant of Conchobar Abradruad, was, according to Lebor Gabála Érenn, a High King of Ireland. He took power after the death of Fedlimid Rechtmar. Cathair ruled for three years, at the end of which he was killed by the Luaigne of Tara, led by Conn Cétchathach. The Lebor Gabála Érenn synchronises his reign with that of the Roman emperor Marcus Aurelius (161–180). The chronology of Geoffrey Keating's Foras Feasa ar Éirinn dates his reign to 113–116, that of the Annals of the Four Masters to 119–122.

== Genealogy ==
According to Foras Feasa ar Éirinn, Cathaoir Mor was a son of Feidhlimidh Fiorurghlas, son of Cormac Gealta Gaoth, son of Nia Corb, son of Cu Corb, son of Mogh Corb, son of Conchubhar Abhradhruadh, son of Fionn File, son of Rossa Ruadh, son of Fearghus Fairrge, son of Nuadha Neacht, son of Seadna Siothbhac, son of Lughaidh Loithfhionn, son of Breasal Breac, son of Fiachaidh Foibhric, son of Oilill Glas, son of Fearadhach Foghlas, son of Nuadha Fullon, son of Ealloit, son of Art, son of Mogh Airt, son of Criomhthann Coscrach, son of Feidhlimidh Foirthriun, son of Fearghus Fortamhail, son of Breasal Breodhamhan, son of Aonghus Ollamh, son of Oilill Bracain, son of Labhraidh Loingseach of the race of Eireamhon.

== Legends ==
He is said to have had thirty sons, but only ten of them had children; several medieval dynasties of Leinster traced their ancestors to them. His daughter Cochrann was said to have been the mother of the fenian hero Diarmuid Ua Duibhne.

He features in the saga Esnada Tige Buchet ("The Melody of the House of Buchet"). Cathair's daughter Eithne Tháebfhota is fostered by a hospitable Leinsterman named Buchet who has many herds of cattle, but Cathair's sons so exploit Buchet's hospitality that he is left with only one bull and seven cows, and the king, now old and enfeebled, is unable to restrain them. Buchet and his family, including Eithne, are reduced to living in a hut in the forest in Kells, County Meath. Later, when Cormac mac Airt is king, he marries Eithne and restores Buchet's fortunes (in other stories the king who marries Eithne is Cathair's successor Conn Cétchathach). In another saga, Fotha Catha Cnucha ("The Cause of the Battle of Cnucha"), Cathair gives the hill of Almu (Knockaulin, County Kildare) to the druid Nuada son of Aichi. This hill will later be famous as the home of Nuada's great-grandson Fionn mac Cumhaill.

== Offspring ==
- Ros Failgeach mac Cathair Mór, ancestor of the Ó Conchubhair of Uí Failghe
- Daire Barrach mac Cathair Mór, ancestor of Uí Treasaig and Mac Gormáin of Uí Bairrche
- Bresal Einechglas mac Cathair Mór
- Fergus Luasgan mac Cathair Mór
- Ailill Cethech mac Cathair Mór
- Aengus Nic mac Cathair Mór
- Eochu Timine mac Cathair Mór
- Crimthann mac Cathair Mór, ancestor of Dubh of Leinster
- Curigh mac Cathair Mór, killed by Fionn mac Cumhail
  - Slectaire mac Curigh, maternal grandfather of Diarmuid Ua Duibhne and Oscar
  - Uchdelbh mac Curigh, wife of Fionn Fothart, a son of Conn Cétchathach
- Eithne Tháebfhota, wife of Conn Cétchathach
- Landabaria mac Cathair Mór, wife of Conn Cétchathach
- Cochrann, mother of the fenian hero Diarmuid Ua Duibhne.
  - Fiacha Baicheda mac Cathair Mór, ancestor of Mac Murchada of the Uí Cheinnselaig, and O'Byrne and others families of the Uí Dúnlainge
- Sodhealbh ní Cathair Mór

Preceded by Fedlimid Rechtmar	High King of Ireland; LGE 2nd century AD; FFE AD 113–116; AFM AD 119–122	Succeeded by Conn Cétchathach
