= Cath Maige Mucrama =

Legendary Irish battle

The Cath Maige Mucrama (in English the Battle of Mag Mucrama) is an early Middle Irish language tale which forms part of the Cycles of the Kings.

== Content ==
The cast includes several major figures from Irish pseudo-history, Ailill Aulom, his son Éogan Mór and his step- and foster-son Mac Con, along with the King of Tara Art mac Cuinn. Mag Mucrama, the plain of the counting of the pigs, was in Connacht, in the region of Athenry, County Galway. A tradition or folk etymology, in Irish dindshenchas, has it that the plain was named for the magical pigs which infested it until banished by Queen Medb of Connacht.

Mac Con, exiled from Ireland, returns with the aid of the king of Britain, along with an army of Britons and Saxons, and conquers Ireland as far as Connacht where Éogan, with the help of Art mac Cuinn, plans to fight. The night before the battle Éogan and Art sleep with their hosts' daughters, conceiving the sons who will succeed them, Fiachu Muillethan in Éogan's case and Cormac mac Airt in Art's. Both Éogan and Art, as is foreseen, die in the battle at Mag Mucrama, and Mac Con becomes king of Tara.

Mac Con takes Cormac mac Airt as his foster son, and rules for seven years. He then pronounces a false judgement, showing that he is unfit to rule, while Cormac gives a right judgment, showing that he is the stuff of kings. Disasters ensue—"no grass came through the earth, nor leaf on tree, nor grain in corn" says the story—and Mac Con is deposed and Cormac is made king in his place. Mac Con travels to Ailill's court, where his foster mother warns him that he is in peril. When Ailill embraces Mac Con he bites him with his poison tooth, wounding Mac Con, who flees but is killed by one of Ailill's warriors.

== Contexts ==
The earliest surviving manuscript containing the tale is in the Book of Leinster, dated to the middle 12th century. The most recent translator dates the tale in that form to the 9th century.

The purpose of the tale is presumed by some to have been political, to explain, and to justify, how it came about that the descendants of Art, that is the Connachta, and of Éogan, the Eóganachta, occupied the leading political positions in Ireland—the Connachta and their offshoot the Uí Néill provided the High King of Ireland and the King of Connacht, the Eóganachta the King of Munster—when their ancestral figures had been defeated by Mac Con, whose own descendants the Corcu Loígde were no longer a force after the 7th century. As such it forms part of the common origin legends of the Uí Néill and the Eóganachta. Mac Con belonged to the ancient Dáirine, who were cousins of the Ulaid. The ancestors of the Eóganachta are known as the Deirgtine.

== Editions, translations, and adaptions ==
The Battle of Mag Mucrama has been translated by Whitley Stokes ("The Battle of Mag Mucrime", Revue Celtique, 13, 1892), by Standish O'Grady (included in Silva Gaedelica, 2 volumes, 1892) and by M. O'Daly in Cath Maige Mucrama: The Battle of Mag Mucrama (1975). A modernization into modern Irish was published by Peadar Ua Laoghaire in 1917 as Lughaidh Mac Con.

== Annalistic references ==
John O'Donovan queried its supposed location in the Ordnance Survey Books for County Galway. As late as the 11th century, it was still used as a locative term, as demonstrated by this obit in the Annals of Inisfallen:

- AI1044.6 Repose of Maenach Muccruma in Achad Deó.
