= Mag Mell =

Mythical realm in Irish mythology

In Irish mythology, Mag Mell (modern spelling: Magh Meall, meaning 'delightful plain') is one of the names for the Celtic Otherworld, a mythical realm achievable through death and/or glory. Unlike the underworld in some mythologies, Mag Mell was a pleasurable paradise, identified as either an island far to the west of Ireland or a kingdom beneath the ocean. However, Mag Mell was similar to the fields of Elysium in Greek mythology, and similarly was accessible only to a select few. Furthermore, Mag Mell, like the numerous other mystical islands said to be off the coast of Ireland, was never explicitly stated in any surviving mythological account to be an afterlife. Rather, it is usually portrayed as a paradise populated by deities, which is occasionally visited by some adventurous mortals. In its island guise, it was visited by various legendary Irish heroes and monks, forming the basis of the adventure myth or echtrae as defined by Myles Dillon in his book Early Irish Literature. This otherworld is a place where sickness and death do not exist, a place of eternal youth and beauty. Here, music, strength, life, and all pleasurable pursuits come together in a single place. Here, happiness lasts forever, and no one wants for food or drink. It is something of an Irish equivalent to the Valhalla of the Norsemen as well as the Elysium of the Greeks.

Legends say its ruler is the sea god Manannán mac Lir, or less often the Fomorian King Tethra. Mag Mell's allure extended from the pagan era to Christian times. In later stories, the realm is less an otherworld destination than an earthly paradise which adventurers could reach by traveling west from Ireland, often blown off course by providential tempests while on an inspired mission. They typically explore many other fantastic islands before reaching their destination and returning home (or sailing on). Among these legendary voyagers are St. Brendan, Bran mac Febal, and Máel Dúin.

== See also ==
- Tír na nÓg
- Aaru
- Aillen
- Avalon
- Erecura
- Fortunate Isles
- Heaven
- Hy-Brasil
- Iriy
- Sídhe
