= Mac Con =

Semi-legendary Irish High King

Lugaid Mac Con, often known simply as Mac Con, was, according to medieval Irish legend and historical tradition, a High King of Ireland. The Lebor Gabála Érenn synchronises Lugaid's reign with that of the Roman emperor Commodus (180–192). The chronology of Geoffrey Keating's Foras Feasa ar Éirinn dates his reign to 173–203, and the Annals of the Four Masters dates his reign to 195–225. He had two sons, Fothad Cairpthech and Fothad Airgthech, who would later be joint High Kings.

== Life ==
Lugaid Mac Con belonged to the Corcu Loígde, and thus to the Dáirine. His father was Macnia mac Lugdach, and his mother was Sadb ingen Chuinn, daughter of the former High King Conn Cétchathach. Mac Con may be to some extent identical with another legendary King of Tara from the Dáirine, Lugaid Loígde.

After Macnia died, Sadb married Ailill Aulom, king of Munster and de facto king of the southern half of Ireland, and Lugaid became his foster-son. He is said to have gained his patronymic/epithet ("dog's son") after he was suckled as a child by a greyhound called Eloir Derg, which belonged to his foster-father. Lugaid and his stepbrothers, against Ailill's will, were allies of Nemed, son of Sroibcenn, king of the Érainn of Munster, who had killed the former High King Conaire Cóem in the battle of Gruitine.

During the reign of the High King Art mac Cuinn, Conaire's sons defeated and killed Nemed in the battle of Cennfebrat. Lugaid was wounded in the battle, and afterwards was exiled from Ireland by his foster-father. Spending a number of years in exile, made an alliance with Benne Brit, son of the king of Britain, raised an army of foreigners, and returned to Ireland. He defeated and killed Art in the Battle of Maigh Mucruimhe in Connacht and took the High Kingship.

Lugaid Mac Con ruled for thirty years until he was driven from the throne at Tara by Art's son, Cormac mac Airt, after he gave a false judgement on Bennaid, a female hospitaller, whose sheep had illegally grazed on the queen's woad.

== Death ==
According to the annals, after being driven from the throne, Lugaid Mac Con fled to Munster to seek help from his relatives. He attempted to make his peace with his foster-father, Ailill Aulom, but Ailill had not forgiven him for the death of his son Éogan Mór, and bit him with a poisoned tooth when they embraced.

Ailill then sent the poet, Ferches mac Commáin, after Lugaid to take revenge for Éogan. Ferches found Lugaid standing with his back to a standing stone, and killed him with a spear.

Cormac was unable to take the throne directly, being forced to flee to Connacht by the king of Ulster, Fergus Dubdétach, who held the High Kingship for a year after Lugaid's death.

Lugaid Mac Con had two sons, Fothad Cairpthech and Fothad Airgthech, who later became joint High Kings.

Modern descendants of Lugaid mac Con reputedly include the O'Driscolls, O'Learys, Coffeys, Hennessys and Flynns of County Cork.

== See also ==
- Lugaid Riab nDerg
- Lugaid mac Con Roí

Preceded by Art mac Cuinn	High King of Ireland; LGE 2nd century AD; FFE AD 173–203; AFM AD 195–225	Succeeded by Fergus Dubdétach
