= Conaire Cóem =

Legendary High King of Ireland

Conaire Cóem ("the beautiful"), son of Mug Láma, son of Coirpre Crou-Chend, son of Coirpre Firmaora, son of Conaire Mór, was, according to medieval Irish legend and historical tradition, the 111th High King of Ireland. He came to power on the death of his father-in-law Conn Cétchathach, and ruled for seven or eight years, at the end of which he was killed by Nemed, son of Sroibcenn, in the battle of Gruitine. He was succeeded by Conn's son Art.

== Time frame ==
The Lebor Gabála Érenn synchronises his reign with that of the Roman emperor Commodus (180–192). The chronology of Geoffrey Keating's Foras Feasa ar Éirinn dates his reign to 136–143, that of the Annals of the Four Masters to 157–165.

== Issue ==
Conaire had three sons by Conn's daughter Saraid. From his third son came the Síl Conairi, named after Conaire Cóem himself or his ancestor Conaire Mór.

- Cairpre Músc, ancestor of the Múscraige and Corcu Duibne
- Cairpre Baschaín, ancestor of the Corcu Baiscind
- Cairpre Riata, ancestor of the Dál Riata

Royal titles
| Preceded by Conn Cétchathach | High King of Ireland; LGE 2nd century AD; FFE AD 136–143; AFM AD 157–165 | Succeeded by Art mac Cuinn |
