= Ailill Aulom =

Semi-legendary Irish king

Ailill Ollamh (or Oilill Olum) in Irish traditional history was the son of Mug Nuadat and was a king of the southern half of Ireland, placed in the 3rd century by early modern Irish genealogy. Sadb ingen Chuinn, daughter of Conn of the Hundred Battles, in her second marriage, married Ailill. He divided the kingdom between his sons Éogan Mór, Cormac Cas, and Cían. Éogan founded the dynasty of the Eóganachta. Sadb's son Lugaid Mac Con, who was Ailill's foster-son, became High King of Ireland.

The Book of Leinster contains poems ascribed to him.

Several Irish surnames claim descent from Ailill Ollamh, reflecting a common tradition in Irish genealogy where families trace their lineage back to notable figures in mythology and history. An Leabhar Muimhneach (The Book of Munster) has an extensive genealogy of the Eóganacht septs.

== Closer to history ==
In one of the oldest surviving tracts on the early history of the Deirgtine, the Proto-Eóganachta, Ailill is himself called a druid. Furthermore, whether or not his father Mug Nuadat ever existed beyond some family association with the god Nuada, Ailill is usually believed a relation or probable descendant of Nia Segamain.

== See also ==
- Gailenga
- Luighne Connacht
