= Celtic sacred trees =

Variety of artifacts in Celtic culture

Many types of trees found in the Celtic nations are considered to be sacred, whether as symbols, or due to medicinal properties, or because they are seen as the abode of particular nature spirits. Historically and in folklore, the respect given to trees varies in different parts of the Celtic world. On the Isle of Man, the phrase 'fairy tree' often refers to the elder tree. The medieval Welsh poem Cad Goddeu (The Battle of the Trees) is believed to contain Celtic tree lore, possibly relating to the crann ogham, the branch of the ogham alphabet where tree names are used as mnemonic devices.

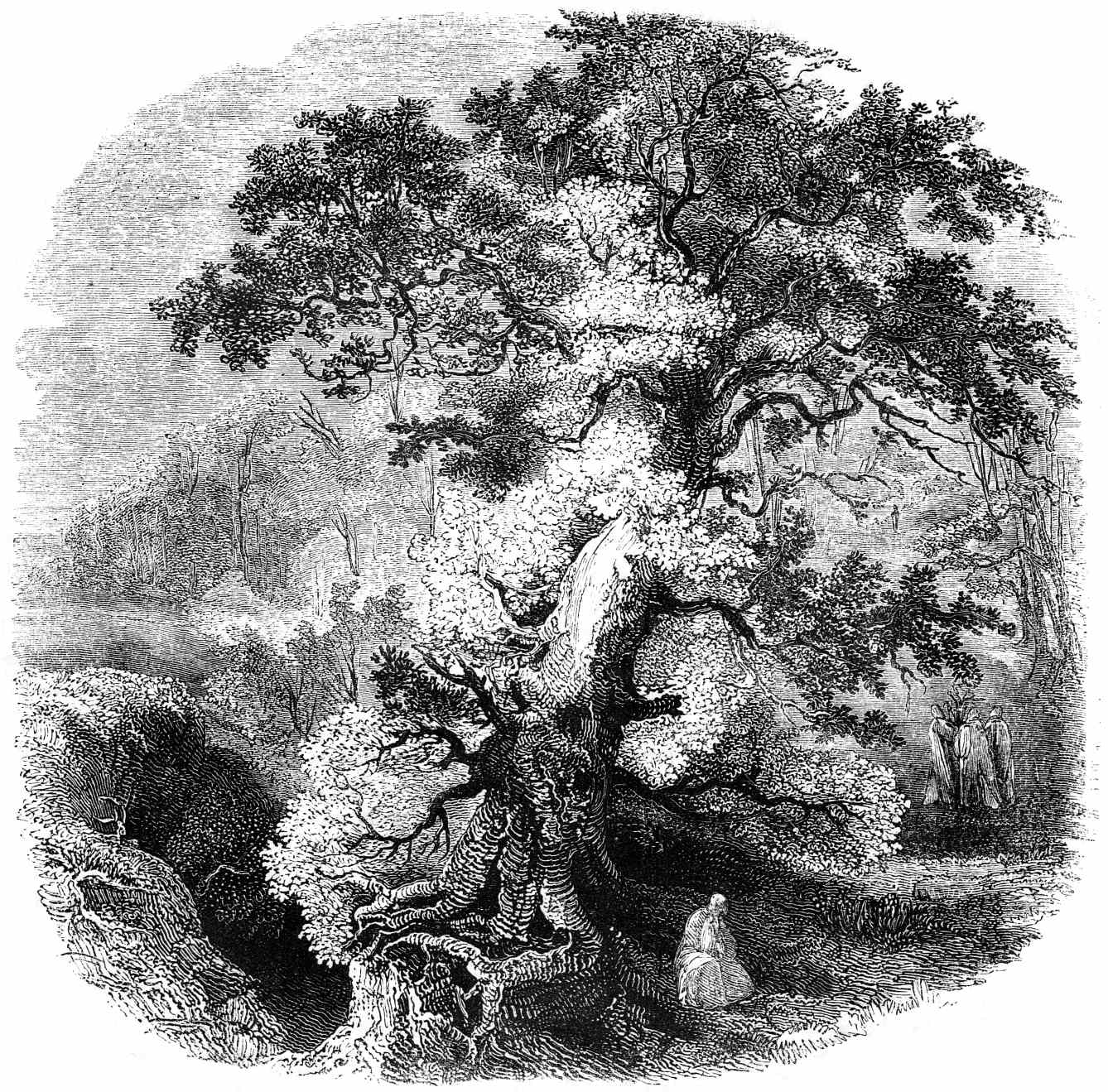
"The Druid Grove" (1845)

== List of trees ==
=== Oak ===
The oak tree features prominently in many Celtic cultures. The ancient geographer Strabo (1st century AD) reported that the important sacred grove and meeting-place of the Galatian Celts of Asia Minor, Drunemeton, was filled with oaks. In an often-cited passage from Historia Naturalis (1st century AD), Pliny the Elder describes a festival on the sixth day of the moon where the druids climbed an oak tree, cut a bough of mistletoe, and sacrificed two white bulls as part of a fertility rite. Britons under Roman occupation worshipped a goddess of the oak tree, Daron, whose name is commemorated in a rivulet in Gwynedd. According to the pseudo-history Lebor Gabála 'Book of Invasions', the sacred oak of early Ireland was that of Mugna, probably located at or near Dunmanogoe, south Co. Kildare. Sacred associations of oaks survived Christianization, so that St Brigit's monastic foundation was at Cill Dara, 'church of (the) oak', i.e. Kildare, and St Colum Cille favoured Doire Calgaich 'Calgach's oak grove', i.e. Derry; see also Durrow, darú, from dair magh, 'oak plain'. In Welsh tradition Gwydion and Math use the flower of oak with broom to fashion the beautiful Blodeuwedd. When Lleu Llaw Gyffes is about to be killed by Gronw Pebyr, his wife's lover, he escapes in eagle form onto a magic oak tree.

In Proto-Celtic the words for "oak" were *daru and *derwā/*deruo; Old Irish and Modern Irish, dair; Scottish Gaelic, darach; Manx, daragh; Welsh, derwen, dâr; Cornish derowen; Breton, dervenn.

=== Ash ===
The ash tree also features strongly in Irish mythology. The mountain ash, rowan, or quicken tree is particularly prominent in Scottish folklore.

There are several recorded instances in Irish history in which people refused to cut an ash, even when wood was scarce, for fear of having their own cabins consumed with flame. The ash tree itself might be used in May Day (Beltaine) rites. Under the Old Irish word nin, the ash also gives its name to the letter N in the ogham alphabet. Together with the oak and thorn, the ash is part of a magical trilogy in fairy lore. (Note: In folk music, see Oak, Ash and Thorn for example.) Ash seedpods may be used in divination, and the wood has the power to ward off fairies, especially on the Isle of Man. In Gaelic Scotland children were given the astringent sap of the tree as a medicine and as a protection against witch-craft. Some famous ash trees were the Tree of Uisnech, the Bough of Dathí, and the Tree of Tortu. The French poet who used Breton sources, Marie de France (late 12th century), wrote a lai about an ash tree. The Proto-Celtic for 'ash' was *onnos (in Delamarre) or *osno- (in Matasovic); Old Irish, nin; Irish, fuinseog; Scots Gaelic, fuinnseann; Manx, unjin; Welsh, onnen; Cornish, onnen; Breton, onnenn.

=== Apple ===
The pome fruit and tree of the apple is celebrated in numerous functions in Celtic mythology, legend, and folklore; it is an emblem of fruitfulness and sometimes a means to immortality. Wands of druids were made from wood either of the yew or of the apple. The Brythonic Avalon in Arthurian tradition in certain medieval narratives, attributing Welsh origin, is translated as Insula Pomorum; 'The Isle of Apples'. One gloss of the name for the magical Irish island Emain Ablach is 'Emain of the Apples'. In the Ulster Cycle the soul of Cú Roí was confined in an apple that lay in the stomach of a salmon which appeared once every seven years. Cúchulainn once gained his escape by following the path of a rolled apple. An apple-tree grew from the grave of the tragic lover Ailinn. In the Irish tale Echtra Condla (The Adventure of Conle), Conle the son of Conn is fed an apple by a fairy lover, which sustains him with food and drink for a month without diminishing; but it also makes him long for the woman and the beautiful country of women to which his lover is enticing him. In the Irish story from the Mythological Cycle, Oidheadh Chlainne Tuireann, the first task given the Children of Tuireann is to retrieve the Apples of the Hesperides (or Hisbernia). Yr Afallennau (Welsh, 'apple trees') is a 12th-century Welsh narrative poem dealing with Myrddin Wyllt. The Breton pseudosaint Konorin was reborn by means of an apple.

The Proto-Celtic word for apple tree was *aballā, *abalnos (in Delamarre) or *abalnā (in Delamarre and Matasovic). Old Irish, uball, ubull; Modern Irish, ubhal, úll; Scots Gaelic ubhall; Manx, ooyl; Welsh, afal; Corn. aval; Bret. Aval.

=== Hazel ===
Both the wood and the edible nuts of the hazel have played important roles in Irish and Welsh traditions. Hazel leaves and nuts are found in early British burial mounds and shaft-wells, especially at Ashill, Norfolk. The place-name story for Fordruim, an early name for Tara, describes it as a pleasant hazel wood. In the Ogham alphabet of early Ireland, the letter C was represented by hazel [OIr. coll]. According to Robert Graves, it also represented the ninth month on the Old Irish calendar, 6 August to 2 September. Initiate members of the Fianna had to defend themselves armed only with a hazel stick and a shield; yet in the Fenian legends the hazel without leaves was thought evil, dripping poisonous milk, and the home of vultures. Thought a fairy tree in both Ireland and Wales, wood from the hazel was sacred to poets and was thus a taboo fuel on any hearth. Heralds carried hazel wands as badges of office. Witches' wands are often made of hazel, as are divining rods, used to find underground water. In Cornwall the hazel was used in the millpreve, the magical adder stones. In Wales a twig of hazel would be given to a rejected lover.

Even more esteemed than the hazel's wood were its nuts, often described as the 'nuts of wisdom', e.g. esoteric or occult knowledge. Hazels of wisdom grew at the heads of the seven chief rivers of Ireland, and nine grew over both Connla's Well and the Well of Segais, the legendary common source of the Boyne and the Shannon. The nuts would fall into the water, causing bubbles of mystic inspiration to form, or were eaten by salmon. The number of spots on a salmon's back were thought to indicate the number of nuts it had consumed. The salmon of wisdom caught by Fionn mac Cumhaill had eaten hazel nuts. Very similar tales related by Taliesin are retained in the Brythonic tradition. Traces of hazelnuts have been found in a 'Celtic' style three-chained suspension bowl discovered in a post-Roman burial dated to 650 CE in London.

The name of the Irish hero Mac Cuill means 'son of the hazel'. W. B. Yeats thought the hazel was the common Irish form of the tree of life. The Proto-Celtic word is reconstructed as *collos or *koslo-, although Delamarre suggests a transformation from *coslo- to *collo-. Old Irish and Modern Irish coll; Scots Gaelic, calltunn, calltuinn; Manx, coull; Welsh, collen; Cornish, collwedhen; Breton, kraoñklevezenn.

=== Alder ===
The alder, a shrub or tree of the birch family has special implications in Celtic tradition. The alder usually grows in wet ground, with small, pendulous catkins. Alders are especially associated with Bran; at Cad Goddeu, 'The Battle of the Trees', Gwydion guessed Bran's name from the alder twigs in his hand. The answer to an old Taliesin riddle 'Why is the alder purple?' is 'Because Bran wore purple'. Bran's alder may be a symbol of resurrection. The name for the boy Gwern, son of Matholwch and Branwen, means 'alder'. The place-name Fernmag (ang. Farney) means 'plain of the alder'.

In Ireland the alder was regarded with awe apparently because when cut the wood turns from white to red. At one time the felling of an alder was punishable, and it is still avoided. The alder was thought to have power of divination, especially in the diagnosing of diseases. Alder might be used in the fé, a rod for measuring corpses and graves in pre-Christian Ireland. The letter F, third consonant in the ogham alphabet, was named after the alder. The Proto-Celtic was *wernā/*uerna or *werno; Old Irish fern; Modern Irish is fearnóg; Scots Gaelic, feàrna; Manx, farney; Welsh, gwernen; Cornish, gwernen; Breton, gwernenn.

=== Elder ===
The elder, having clusters of white flowers and red or blackish berry-like fruit, has many associations with the fairy world in oral traditions of recent centuries in Celtic countries. On the Isle of Man, where elder grows abundantly and is called tramman, it is commonly thought of as the 'fairy tree'. In Ireland many individual elder trees were thought haunted by fairies or demons. Old Irish is tromm; Modern Irish is trom; Scots Gaelic, troman, droman; Welsh, ysgawen; Cornish, scawen; Breton, skavenn.

=== Yew ===
The evergreen yew with dark green, poisonous, needle-like leaves and red berries has commonly symbolized death in classical antiquity. It is still commonly planted in Christian churchyards and cemeteries.

One of Conchobar mac Nessa's residences at Emain Macha, Cráebruad, has nine rooms lined with red yew. The agnomen of Cáer, the swan maiden, is Ibormeith [yew berry].

Fergus, the hapless brother of Niall Noígiallach (of the Nine Hostages) in Echtra Mac nEchach Muigmedóin (The Adventure of the Sons of Eochaid Mugmedón), signals his sterility when he rescues from a burning forge only the 'withered wood' of yew, which will not burn.

The Proto-Celtic word is reconstructed as *eburo-. The Old Irish words for yew are ibar; Modern Irish, iúr; Scots Gaelic, iubhar; Manx, euar; Welsh, ywen; Cornish, ewen; Breton, ivinenn.

== Examples ==
- Latoon fairy bush, County Clare, Ireland

== See also ==
- Sacred groves
- Sacred mountains
- Sacred rivers
- Sacred trees

== Bibliography ==
- McKillop, James (1998). A Dictionary of Celtic Mythology. Oxford Reference Online. Oxford: Oxford University Press. ISBN 978-0198804840.
- Delamarre, Xavier (2003). Dictionnaire de la langue gauloise: Une approche linguistique du vieux-celtique continental (in French). Errance. ISBN 9782877723695.
- Monaghan, Patricia (2004). The Encyclopedia of Celtic Mythology and Folklore. New York: Facts On File.
