= Bebhionn =

Bebhionn may refer to:

- Bebhionn (moon), a moon of Saturn
- Béḃinn, an early Irish goddess
- Beibhinn Parsons, Irish rugby union player
