= Maponos =

Ancient Celtic god of youth

Maponos (also Maponus; Gaulish for 'divine son' or 'divine youth') was an ancient Celtic god worshipped in Britain and Gaul, commonly interpreted as a god of youth. In Britain his cult is attested chiefly at Roman military sites in the north, around Hadrian's Wall, where he was identified with Apollo through the interpretatio romana. His name derives from the Celtic word for 'son' and carries a divine suffix also present in the name of his mother, the goddess Matrona. He is generally seen as the antecedent of the medieval Welsh figure Mabon fab Modron, and is often compared with the Irish god Mac ind Óc. No classical author names him. He is known from a group of Latin and Gaulish inscriptions and from place-names, supplemented by the later insular literary tradition.

== Name ==
The god's name is recorded in Latin dedicatory inscriptions from the north of Britain, where it appears as Maponus and, with the interpretatio romana, as Apollo Maponus. It also occurs in Gaulish inscriptions and in several place-names, among them Locus Maponi, listed in the Ravenna Cosmography and generally identified with Lochmaben in Dumfriesshire. The theonym is not attested in classical literature, the evidence for the god being epigraphic, toponymic, which are partly completed by the comparison with later medieval attestations.

The theonym Maponos is a Gaulish name built on the element mapo- ('boy, son'), from Proto-Celtic *makʷos ('son'). (Note: Ranko Matasović connects the Proto-Celtic word with a Proto-Indo-European root *meh₂k- ('grow, raise'), while calling the derivation uncertain. Xavier Delamarre instead derives it from the Celtic word for 'boy', from Proto-Indo-European *mogʰu- ('young person').) The same word gives Welsh, Cornish and Breton mab and, with an expressive geminate (*makʷkʷos), Old Irish macc. (Note: Xavier Delamarre cites as a parallel to this gemination the Brittonic word for 'girl', Welsh merch and Breton merc'h, which he reconstructs as *merkkā. Ranko Matasović reconstructs that word without a geminate, as *merkā, and regards the geminate of macc as unexplained.) To this stem is added the suffix -onos, which in Gaulish forms divine and augmentative names, so that Maponos is understood as 'the divine son' or 'the great youth'. The name is an exact cognate of the Welsh Mabon, which continues an earlier *Mapono-. Bernhard Maier observes that the same ending -onos (feminine -onā) recurs in a group of Welsh names that continue Celtic divine names, among them Modron (from Matrona, 'the divine mother'), Rhiannon (from *Rīgantonā, 'the divine queen') and Gofannon (from *Gobannonos, 'the divine smith'), which he takes to be euhemerised deities.

The stem mapo- is also common in personal names, such as Maponius and Mapillus. Maponus also occurs as a personal name in its own right, borne by an actor commemorated on a funerary inscription from Haute-Marne and recorded on potters' stamps. Place-names built on the same element include Mapo-riton ('ford of the son') in Britain, Locus Maponi, and De Mabono fonte ('the spring of Maponos'), the last recorded in an 11th-century charter of the abbey of Savigny in the Rhône.

== Cult ==
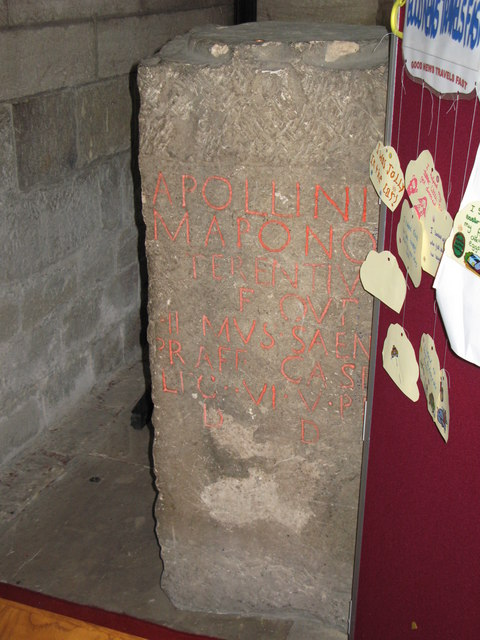
Inscription to Apollo Maponos on a Roman-era altar at Hexham Abbey

Maponos is attested chiefly in the north of Britain, with most inscriptions equating him with Apollo. Anne Ross noted that the dedicants were often high-ranking officers of the Roman army. At Vindolanda on Hadrian's Wall a crescent-shaped silver plaque is inscribed Deo Mapono ('to the god Maponus'). Three dedications to Apollo Maponus, set up by legionary officers, come from Corbridge (Corstopitum), where they were found together with objects that have been interpreted as belonging to a head cult. A monument from Ribchester (Bremetennacum), erected in 241 by the acting-commander of a unit of Sarmatian cavalry for the welfare of the emperor, names Apollo Maponus and carries reliefs of Apollo holding a lyre and of two female figures. A relief of Apollo with a lyre appears again on one of the Corbridge altars, and the god's British cult has on this basis been associated with music and poetry, an association earlier expressed as an equation with Apollo Citharoedus, 'the harper'. The dedication from Brampton in Cumberland, which names Maponos without Apollo, was set up jointly with the numen of the emperor by four men described as Germans, evidence that the cult drew worshippers from the provincial garrison.

No surviving image can be securely identified as Maponos. Ian Richmond suggested that one of the Celtic-style stone heads from Corbridge represented the god, but Ross regarded this as doubtful, since the sombre, mature face does not match the youthfulness implied by the name.

In Gaul the theonym is less securely attested. The lead tablet from Chamalières, one of the longest surviving texts in the Gaulish language, invokes Maponos Arvernatis ('Maponos of the Arverni'), and a Gaulish inscription from Cajarc contains the word mapo. The place-name De Mabono fonte of the Savigny charter has been taken to point to a Gaulish cult of the god in the neighbourhood of a spring.

The god's name survives in the Solway district in the village name Lochmaben and in the Lochmaben Stone near Gretna. Ross inferred that the centre of his cult lay in this part of the Border country, where Jan de Vries held that he was worshipped especially among the Brigantes. The Locus Maponi of the Ravenna Cosmography is also attested on an inscription from the nearby fort of Birrens (Blatobulgium), which records a gift made by one Cistumucus loco Maponi ('from Locus Maponi').

== Interpretation ==
=== Ancient Celtic ===
Maponos is one of a number of native gods brought under Apollo in Gaul and Britain by the interpretatio romana. Jan de Vries treated the god as a third distinct use of the name Apollo among the Celts, beside the healing Apollo of Gaul and the supposed solar Apollo of Noricum, and connected the equation with Apollo the far-shooter with the god's youthful and hunting character. In Britain the connection with music, reflected in the lyre-bearing Apollo of the dedications, is one that Proinsias Mac Cana noted is a common attribute of divine figures in the insular tradition.

De Vries held that the youth denoted by the name was that of young men of fighting age rather than of children, rejecting the reading of Maponos as a protector of children too young to bear arms. Following this, David Rankin has read the ordeals of the Welsh Mabon as reflecting rites of passage towards the attainment of maturity.

The god's name pairs him with a mother rather than a consort. His mother is the goddess Matrona ('the divine mother'), the eponym of the river Marne, and the pair reappears in medieval Welsh literature as Mabon fab Modron ('Mabon son of Modron'). On the basis of the equations Modron–Matrona and Mabon–Maponos, the Welsh scholar William John Gruffydd read the story of the child's abduction, the mother's search and the son's eventual release as a Celtic counterpart of the Greek myth of Demeter and Persephone. Bernhard Maier notes that this reading, though often cited, has rarely been tested against other sources, and that its reconstruction of pre-literary stages is speculative.

=== Medieval Celtic parallels ===
Maponos is commonly interpreted as the antecedent of the medieval Welsh figure Mabon fab Modron, and is often compared with the Irish god Mac ind Óc.

In the tale Culhwch ac Olwen, Mabon is a prisoner whom Arthur's men must free. He had been taken from his mother when three nights old, and is released from his prison at Caer Loyw (Gloucester) to take part in the hunt for the boar Twrch Trwyth. The Welsh Triads name him as one of the 'Three Exalted Prisoners' of Britain, and a figure named Mabon recurs in continental Arthurian romance as Mabuz and Mabonagrain. (Note: A second figure, Mabon fab Mellt ('Mabon son of Lightning'), is sometimes taken to be a doublet of Mabon fab Modron. The name Mellt has been derived from an earlier Meldos ('lightning') and read as the name of Mabon's father.) Eric Hamp proposed that the term Mabinogi originally meant the body of material concerning the god Maponos, and Patrick K. Ford identified Maponos closely with the Welsh Pryderi. In a study of the Chamalières tablet, Bernard Sergent has also set Maponos beside the Irish Nechtan. According to Mac Cana, the most obvious insular parallel to Mabon and Maponos is the Irish Mac ind Óc ('the young son', also called Óengus), son of the Dagda and of Boann.

However, the identification of these figures across regions is not straightforward. The British cult belongs to the Roman period and its garrison, while the Welsh and Irish material offers only a glimpse of the god's original myth. Ronald Hutton observed that the Gaulish Maponos was a healer of springs, the British god a musician, the Welsh Mabon a hunter, and the Irish Mac ind Óc a wilful trickster. Hutton concluded that treating them as a single deity creates more problems than it solves. Mac Cana likewise warned that Mabon and Mac ind Óc preserve only some of the aspects gathered in Gaul under the name Apollo.

== Epigraphy ==
Maponos is named in six dedications from Roman Britain, all from military sites in the north, and once in a Gaulish inscription. In four of the British texts he is identified with Apollo. The dedication from Brampton and the silver plaque from Vindolanda name him alone.

Text	Find-spot	Divine name(s)	Translation	Reference	Comments
andedion uediiumi diiiuion risun artiu mapon(os) aruernatin lopites snieddic sos brixtia anderon [...]	Chamalières (Puy-de-Dôme)	Maponos Arvernatis	The opening invokes the god Maponos Arvernatis ('Maponos of the Arverni') by the incantation of the underworld gods (brixtia anderon). The rest names the persons cursed, and much of the wording is disputed.	RIIG L-100	A lead defixio of about 336 letters from a spring sanctuary, one of the longest surviving texts in Gaulish. First half of the 1st century AD.
Apollini Mapono Q(uintus) Terentius Q(uinti) f(ilius) Ouf(entina) Firmus Saen(a) praef(ectus) castr(orum) leg(ionis) VI V(ictricis) P(iae) F(idelis) d(onum) d(edit)	Corbridge (Corstopitum), Northumberland	Apollo Maponus	To Apollo Maponus, Quintus Terentius Firmus, son of Quintus, of the Oufentina voting-tribe, from Saena, prefect of the camp of the Sixth Legion Victrix Pia Fidelis, gave this gift.	RIB 1120	Now set into the wall of Hexham Abbey. Dedicated by the prefect of the camp of Legio VI Victrix.
[Ap]ollini Mapon[o] [Calpu]rnius [...] trib(unus) dedicavit	Corbridge (Corstopitum), Northumberland	Apollo Maponus	To Apollo Maponus, Calpurnius [...], tribune, dedicated this.	RIB 1121	Found reused as the base of the market cross at Corbridge. On its sides, reliefs of Apollo holding a lyre and of Diana with a bow and quiver.
[Deo] [M]apo[no] Apo[llini] P(ublius) Ae[...]lus (centurio) [leg(ionis) VI] [V]ic(tricis) v(otum) [s(olvit) l(ibens) m(erito)]	Corbridge (Corstopitum), Northumberland	Maponus Apollo	To the god Maponus Apollo, Publius Ae[...], centurion of the Sixth Legion Victrix, fulfilled his vow willingly and deservedly.	RIB 1122	The divine name stands in the reversed order Maponus Apollo.
Deo San(cto) [A]pollini Mapon(o) [pr]o salute D(omini) N(ostri) [et] n(umeri) eq(uitum) Sar[m(atarum)] Bremetenn(acensium) [G]ordiani [A]el(ius) Antoninus (centurio) leg(ionis) VI Vic(tricis) domo Melitenis praep(ositus) et pr(aefectus) v(otum) s(olvit) l(ibens) m(erito) [de]dic(atum) pr(idie) Kal(endas) Sep(tembres) [Im]p(eratore) d(omino) n(ostro) Gord[i]ano Aug(usto) II et Pon[peia]no co(n)s(ulibus)	Ribchester (Bremetennacum), Lancashire	Apollo Maponus	To the holy god Apollo Maponus, for the welfare of our Lord and of Gordian's Own Unit of Sarmatian cavalry of Bremetennacum, Aelius Antoninus, centurion of the Sixth Legion Victrix, from Melitene, acting-commander and prefect, fulfilled his vow willingly and deservedly. Dedicated on the day before the Kalends of September, in the consulship of our Lord the emperor Gordian for the second time and of Pompeianus.	RIB 583	Part of a monument rather than an altar. Reliefs of Apollo resting on a lyre and of two female figures, identified as personifications of the regio Bremetennacensis and of Britannia Inferior. Ross read the figures instead as huntresses. Dated by the consuls to 31 August 241.
Deo Mapono et n(umini) Aug(usti) Durio et Ramio et Trupo et Lurio Germani v(otum) s(olverunt) l(ibentes) m(erito)	Brampton, Cumberland	Maponus	To the god Maponus and to the divine power of the Augustus, Durio and Ramio and Trupo and Lurio, Germans, fulfilled their vow willingly and deservedly.	RIB 2063	The god is named without Apollo. Set up by four men described as Germans.
Deo Mapono	Vindolanda (Chesterholm), Northumberland	Maponus	To the god Maponus.	RIB 2431.2	Inscribed on a crescent-shaped silver plaque. 3rd century.
