= *H₂epom Nepōts =

Proto-Indo-European water fire deity

- Symbol: fire in water

Equivalents
- Greek: Poseidon
- Hindu: Varuna
- Roman: Neptune
- Irish: Nechtan

*H₂epom Nepōts ('Descendant of the Waters') is a reconstructed Proto-Indo-European deity who dwells in waters, and whose powers must be ritually gained or controlled by a hero who is the only one able to approach it. The motif may come from swamp gas lights, which are common in Ukraine, the possible Proto-Indo-European homeland.

A wide range of linguistic and cultural evidence attest the holy status of the terrestrial (potable) waters *h₂ep-, venerated collectively as "the Waters" or divided into "Rivers and Springs". The cults of fountains and rivers, which may have preceded Proto-Indo-European beliefs by tens of thousands of years, was also prevalent in their tradition. Some authors have proposed *Neptonos or *H₂epom Nepōts as the Proto-Indo-European god of the waters. The name literally means "Grandson [or Nephew] of the Waters". Linguists reconstruct his name from that of the Vedic god Apám Nápát, the Roman god Neptūnus, and the Old Irish god Nechtain. Although such a god has been solidly reconstructed in Proto-Indo-Iranian religion, Mallory and Adams nonetheless still reject him as a Proto-Indo-European deity on linguistic grounds.

In the Rigveda, the god Apám Nápát is envisioned as a form of fire residing in the waters. In Celtic mythology, a well belonging to the god Nechtain is said to blind all those who gaze into it. In an old Armenian poem, a small reed in the middle of the sea spontaneously catches fire and the hero Vahagn springs forth from it with fiery hair and a fiery beard and eyes that blaze as suns. In a ninth-century Norwegian poem by the poet Thiodolf, the name sǣvar niþr, meaning "grandson of the sea", is used as a kenning for fire. Even the Greek tradition contains possible allusions to the myth of a fire-god dwelling deep beneath the sea. The phrase "νέποδες καλῆς Ἁλοσύδνης" ("népodes kalês Halosúdnēs"), meaning "descendants of the beautiful seas", is used in The Odyssey 4.404 as an epithet for the seals of Proteus, which is directly analogous to the phrase *H₂epom Nepōts literally "Descendant of the waters".

== Indo-Iranian fire and water ==
In one Vedic hymn Apām Napāt is described as emerging from the water, golden, and "clothed in lightning", which has been conjectured to be a reference to fire. His regular identification with Agni, who is described a number of times as hiding or residing in water, and comparison with other Indo-European texts, has led some to speculate about the existence of a Proto-Indo-European myth featuring a fire deity born from water.

Other such mentions include the ninth-century Skaldic poem Ynglingatal, which uses the kenning sǣvar niþr 'kinsman of the sea' to refer to fire, and an old Armenian poem in which a reed in the middle of the sea spontaneously catches fire, from which springs the hero Vahagn, with fiery hair and eyes that blaze like sun.

=== Conjectured original fireless myth ===
Whether fire was an original part of Apam Napat's nature remains a matter of debate, especially since this connection is absent from the Iranian version. Hermann Oldenberg believed Apam Napat was originally an independent water deity who later came to be associated with Agni, in part because of an ancient Indian belief that water contained fire within itself, fire appearing to "enter into" water when quenched by it.

Associations with Savitr could be understood as similarly deriving from an image of the setting sun sinking into the ocean. Another theory explains the connection between fire and water through lightning, "the flash of fire born from the rainbearing clouds".

=== 'Swamp gas' conjecture ===
Based on the idea that this fire-from-water image was inspired by the flaming seepage of natural gas, attempts have been made to connect the name "Apam Napat" to the word "naphtha", which passed into Greek – and thence English – from an Iranian language.

However, there is only a modest amount of evidence for a link between the sacred fires of Iranian religion and petroleum or natural gas – although the account of the blowing of the three sacred fires out to sea from the back of the ox Srishok where, unquenched, they continue to burn on the water is suggestive – particularly in relation to hydrocarbon deposits in the Southwestern part of the Caspian Sea, exploited currently by the Absheron gas field near Baku in Azerbaijan.

The etymology of the word "naphtha" has been claimed likely to relate to the Akkadian napṭu, "petroleum".

== Bibliography ==
- Anthony, David W. (2007). The Horse, the Wheel, and Language: How Bronze-Age Riders from the Eurasian Steppes Shaped the Modern World. Princeton University Press. ISBN 978-1400831104.
- Anthony, David W.; Brown, Dorcas R. (2019). "Late Bronze Age midwinter dog sacrifices and warrior initiations at Krasnosamarskoe, Russia". In Olsen, Birgit A.; Olander, Thomas; Kristiansen, Kristian (eds.). Tracing the Indo-Europeans: New evidence from archaeology and historical linguistics. Oxbow Books. ISBN 978-1-78925-273-6.
- Arvidsson, Stefan (2006). Aryan Idols: Indo-European Mythology as Ideology and Science. University of Chicago Press. ISBN 0-226-02860-7.
- Beekes, Robert S. P. (2009). Etymological Dictionary of Greek. Brill. ISBN 978-90-04-32186-1.
- Beekes, Robert S. P. (2011). Comparative Indo-European Linguistics: An Introduction. John Benjamins Publishing. ISBN 9789027211859.
- Benveniste, Emile (1973). Indo-European Language and Society. Translated by Palmer, Elizabeth. Coral Gables, Florida: University of Miami Press. ISBN 978-0-87024-250-2.
- Burkert, Walter (1985). Greek Religion. Cambridge, Massachusetts: Harvard University Press. ISBN 0-674-36281-0.
- Delamarre, Xavier (2003). Dictionnaire de la langue gauloise: Une approche linguistique du vieux-celtique continental (in French). Errance. ISBN 9782877723695.
- Derksen, Rick (2008). Etymological Dictionary of the Slavic Inherited Lexicon. Brill. ISBN 9789004155046.
- Dumézil, Georges (1966). Archaic Roman Religion: With an Appendix on the Religion of the Etruscans (1996 ed.). Johns Hopkins University Press. ISBN 978-0-8018-5482-8.
- Dumézil, Georges (1986). Mythe et épopée: L'idéologie des trois fonctions dans les épopées des peuples indo-européens (in French). Gallimard. ISBN 978-2-07-026961-7.
- Fortson, Benjamin W. (2004). Indo-European Language and Culture. Blackwell Publishing. ISBN 1-4051-0316-7.
- Gamkrelidze, Thomas V.; Ivanov, Vjaceslav V. (1995). Winter, Werner (ed.). Indo-European and the Indo-Europeans: A Reconstruction and Historical Analysis of a Proto-Language and a Proto-Culture. Trends in Linguistics: Studies and Monographs 80. Berlin: M. De Gruyter.
- Haudry, Jean (1987). La religion cosmique des Indo-Européens (in French). Archè. ISBN 978-2-251-35352-4.
- Jackson, Peter (2002). "Light from Distant Asterisks. Towards a Description of the Indo-European Religious Heritage". Numen. 49 (1): 61–102. doi:10.1163/15685270252772777. JSTOR 3270472.
- Jakobson, Roman (1985). "Linguistic Evidence in Comparative Mythology". In Stephen Rudy (ed.). Roman Jakobson: Selected Writings. Vol. VII: Contributions to Comparative Mythology: Studies in Linguistics and Philology, 1972–1982. Walter de Gruyter. ISBN 9783110855463.
- Kurkjian, Vahan M. (1958). "History of Armenia: Chapter XXXIV". Penelope. University of Chicago.
- Leeming, David A. (2009). Creation Myths of the World: An Encyclopedia. Vol. 1. ABC-CLIO. ISBN 9781598841749.
- Littleton, C. Scott (1982). "From swords in the earth to the sword in the stone: A possible reflection of an Alano-Sarmatian rite of passage in the Arthurian tradition". In Polomé, Edgar C. (ed.). Homage to Georges Dumézil. Journal of Indo-European Studies, Institute for the Study of Man. pp. 53–68. ISBN 9780941694285.
- Lincoln, Bruce (November 1975). "The Indo-European Myth of Creation". History of Religions. 15 (2): 121–145. doi:10.1086/462739. S2CID 162101898.
- Lincoln, Bruce (August 1976). "The Indo-European Cattle-Raiding Myth". History of Religions. 16 (1): 42–65. doi:10.1086/462755. JSTOR 1062296. S2CID 162286120.
- Lincoln, Bruce (1991). Death, War, and Sacrifice: Studies in Ideology and Practice. Chicago, Illinois: University of Chicago Press. ISBN 978-0226482002.
- Mallory, James P. (1991). In Search of the Indo-Europeans. London: Thames & Hudson. ISBN 978-0-500-27616-7.
- Mallory, James P.; Adams, Douglas Q. (1997). Encyclopedia of Indo-European Culture. London: Routledge. ISBN 978-1-884964-98-5.
- Mallory, James P.; Adams, Douglas Q. (2006). The Oxford Introduction to Proto-Indo-European and the Proto-Indo-European World. Oxford, England: Oxford University Press. ISBN 978-0-19-929668-2.
- Matasović, Ranko (2009). Etymological Dictionary of Proto-Celtic. Brill. ISBN 9789004173361.
- Parpola, Asko (2015). The Roots of Hinduism: The Early Aryans and the Indus Civilization. Oxford University Press. ISBN 9780190226923.
- Polomé, Edgar C. (1986). "The Background of Germanic Cosmogonic Myths". In Brogyanyi, Bela; Krömmelbein, Thomas (eds.). Germanic Dialects: Linguistic and Philological Investigations. John Benjamins Publishing. ISBN 978-90-272-7946-0.
- Puhvel, Jaan (1987). Comparative Mythology. Baltimore, Maryland: Johns Hopkins University Press. ISBN 978-0-8018-3938-2.
- Renfrew, Colin (1987). Archaeology & Language. The Puzzle of the Indo-European Origins. London: Jonathan Cape. ISBN 978-0-521-35432-5.
- Telegrin, D. Ya.; Mallory, James P. (1994). The Anthropomorphic Stelae of the Ukraine: The Early Iconography of the Indo-Europeans. Journal of Indo-European Studies Monograph Series. Vol. 11. Washington D.C., United States: Institute for the Study of Man. ISBN 978-0941694452.
- Tirta, Mark (2004). Petrit Bezhani (ed.). Mitologjia ndër shqiptarë (in Albanian). Tirana: Mësonjëtorja. ISBN 99927-938-9-9.
- Treimer, Karl (1971). "Zur Rückerschliessung der illyrischen Götterwelt und ihre Bedeutung für die südslawische Philologie". In Henrik Barić (ed.). Arhiv za Arbanasku starinu, jezik i etnologiju. Vol. I. R. Trofenik. pp. 27–33.
- Watkins, Calvert (1995). How to Kill a Dragon: Aspects of Indo-European Poetics. London: Oxford University Press. ISBN 978-0-19-514413-0.
- West, Martin L. (2007). Indo-European Poetry and Myth. Oxford, England: Oxford University Press. ISBN 978-0-19-928075-9.
- Winter, Werner (2003). Language in Time and Space. Berlin, Germany: Walter de Gruyter. ISBN 978-3-11-017648-3.
- Witzel, Michael (2012). The Origins of the World's Mythologies. Oxford University Press. ISBN 978-0-19-981285-1.
- York, Michael (1988). "Romulus and Remus, Mars and Quirinus". Journal of Indo-European Studies. 16 (1–2): 153–172. ISSN 0092-2323.
