= Ethal =

King in Irish mythology

In Irish Mythology, Ethal Anbuail, sometimes spelled Anubhail, is one of the Tuatha Dé Danann, and king of the Munster Sidhe. He had a daughter, Cáer.

== Appearances in Irish Mythology ==
Ethal is primarily known because of his participation in the myth The Dream of Aengus. In which Ailill mac Máta and Dagda wage war with him to marry his daughter Cáer to Aengus, son of Dagda. In this war, Ethal's kingdom is destroyed by the forces of Dagda and Ailill.

== Texts ==
- Aisling Óenguso: The Dream of Óengus
- The Song of Wandering Aengus: The Song of Wandering Aengus
