= Elcmar =

Husband of goddess Boann in Irish mythology

In Irish mythology, Elcmar or Ecmar (modern spelling: Ealcmhar) is the husband of Boann and belongs to the divine Tuatha Dé Danann. It has been suggested that he is Nuada under another name, and he is sometimes confused with Nechtan, Boann's usual husband. At first glance he appears to be associated with horses but there is also a school of thought that says his name means The Evil One. In the Dindsenchas, he is called "lord of horses" and is described as a judge. Elcmar is described as having a fork of white hazel, a gold brooch, and a cloak.

== Chief steward ==
According to the Yellow Book of Lecan, Elcmar served as chief steward for Dagda, one of the most important and powerful of the Danann. His wife was Boann, goddess of the River Boyne, who developed a great passion for the Dagda. To consummate this union, Dagda sent Elcmar to High King Bres on an errand around the time of Imbolc. Boann, like her Greek counterpart Alcmene, got pregnant. To protect the sensibilities of his steward and the life of the child, the Dagda held the sun still for nine months so Boann's pregnancy lasted only one day; elsewhere, the Dagda kept hunger, thirst, and darkness from Elcmar during his journey, so that it only seemed to be a day for Elcmar. Boann named the baby Mac Og and gave him to the Dagda. The child was reared by his foster father, Midir, safely away from any retribution that Elcmar might desire.

Elcmar and Oengus mac Og eventually meet when the Dagda passes out the sitheans (the residences of the Sidhe, "fairy mounds" ) and omits giving one to Oengus. To make up for his mistake, the Dagda tells Oengus how to trick Elcmar out of the Brugh na Boinne. On Samhain Oengus challenges him to a duel and defeats him but spares his life if Elcmar will give him the Brugh for day and night. For his life Elcmar accepts the offer.

The absence of an article leads to Elcmar losing the Brugh to Oengus, since Old Irish lacks indefinite articles, so the same phrase means both "a day and a night" (24 hours) and "day and night" (always). To placate his steward the Dagda gives him another sithean. There is no love lost between Elcmar and Oengus, and Elcmar is present during the infamous hurling match that results in Midir losing his eye.

Although Boann is not named specifically as the mother of Englec, the daughter of Elcmar, there are no tales of Boann ever leaving her husband. Englec develops an incestual passion for her half brother, although she has never seen him. Slipping away to a hurling match where she expects to see Oengus, she ends up being carried off by Midir.

Englec winds up Midir's lover. Elcmar kills Midir afterwards. In turn, Oengus kills Elcmar for killing Midir.

Another of Elcmar's daughters is named as Fea, who becomes the wife of Neit.
