= Béḃinn =

- Pronunciation: /ˈbeɪviːn, ˈbeɪvɪn/ BAY-veen, BAY-vin; Irish: [ˈbʲeːvʲiːn̠ʲ] (southern) or [ˈbʲeːvʲɪn̠ʲ] (northern)
- Gender: Female
- Language: Irish

Origin
- Meaning: melodious woman

Other names
- Alternative spelling: Bé Binn
- Variant form: Béfionn
- Related names: Bé Bind

Béḃinn (/ˈbeɪviːn, ˈbeɪvɪn/) or Bé Binn, in modern orthography Béibhinn, is an early Irish personal and mythological name. In some sources Béḃinn is a goddess associated with birth and the sister of the river-goddess, Boann. Béḃinn is also described as being an underworld goddess in both Irish and Welsh mythology, inhabiting either the Irish underworld Mag Mell or the Welsh Annwn, although it is unknown which is the original source.

== Etymology and variations ==
The name Béḃinn is said to be a combination between medieval forms of the Irish Gaelic word for "woman", "bean" (pronounced "bahn"), and the adjective "melodious", "binn", literally translating to "melodious woman". Other versions of the name, such as Béfionn, instead pair "woman" with "fair". Variant forms include Bé Bind, Bé Find, Bé Binn, Bebhinn, Bébhinn, Bébhínn, Bébhionn, Béibhionn, Béḃind, Béfind, Béfionn and Befionna. While it has also been Anglicized as Vivionn and Vivian, it is unrelated to the French or English names. In eighteenth-century Scottish writer James Macpherson's epic Ossian poems, the name appears as Vevina.

In the Irish Annals, the name appears as,

	Two words	One word
lenition noted	Be Bhinn, Bé Bhind	Bébhinn, Bebhinn, Beuynn, Bevin
not noted	Be Binn, Be Bind	Bébinn, Bebinn, Bebind

It is recorded from the decades around the year 1100 and again around 1400.

== In mythology ==
Béḃinn is alternately described as either the wife of Áed, a god, or Idath, a mortal man. She is mentioned in multiple sources as the mother of Connacht hero Fráech, the main character in the Táin Bó Fraích. In the Fenian Cycle of Irish tales, Béḃinn is "a beautiful giantess of aristocratic bearing" who seeks protection from the Fianna when a cruel giant pursues her. In other sources a Béḃinn is mentioned as a daughter of Elcmar.

The epithet Bé Find ("Fair Woman") is applied to the heroine Étaín by Midir in Tochmarc Étaíne (English: The Wooing of Étaín). The text includes a poem attributed to Midir, known as "A Bé Find in ragha lium". However, this poem may be an older composition unrelated to the Étaín story that was appended at a later time.

== In history ==
The name Béḃinn and its variants is quite common in records from early Irish history, and was borne by historical as well as mythical figures, including a number of queens and abbesses. It was also the name High King Brian Boru's mother and one of his daughters.

== Notable people ==
=== Modern period ===
- Béibhinn Parsons

=== Historical ===
- Bé Binn inion Urchadh, Queen of Thomond, fl. c. 941.
- Bé Binn ingen Briain, died 1073.
- Bé Binn Ní Briain, Queen of Ailech, died 1110.
- Bé Binn ingen Turgeis, died 1127/1134.
- Bé Binn Ní Con Chaille, died 1134.
- Bé Binn Ní Eochagain, died 1363.
- Bé Binn Ní Ruairc, died 1367.
- Bé Binn Ní Duinn, died 1376.
- Bé Binn Ní Maolconaire, died 1391.
- Bé Binn Ní Donnchada, died 1413.
- Bébhinn Ní Donnchada, died 1413.
- Bébhinn Ní Ruairc, died 1426.

== See also ==
- List of Irish-language given names
- Bebhionn (moon)
