= Aengus =

Irish god of youth, love, and poetic inspiration

- Member of the Tuatha Dé Danann
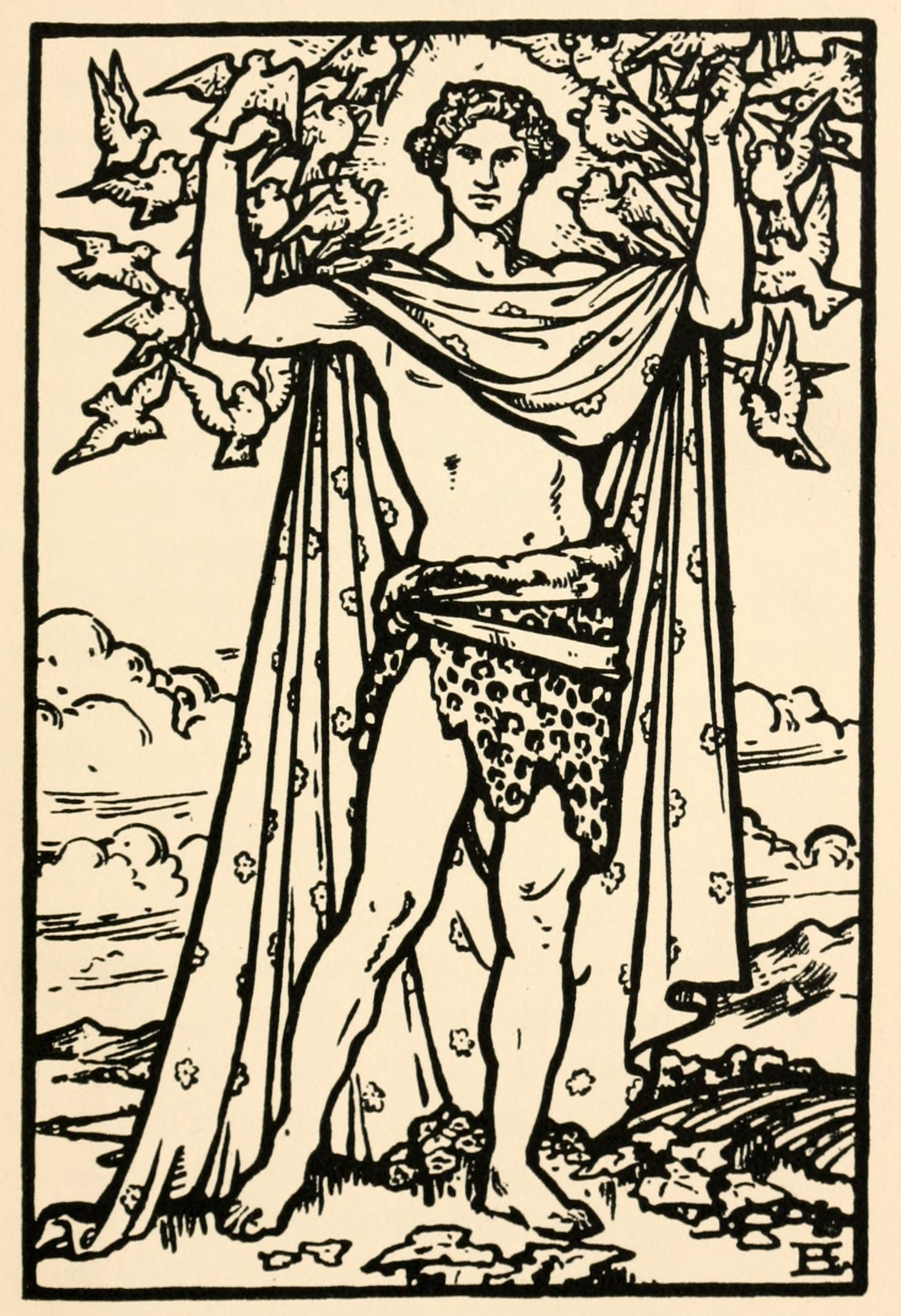
- Aengus, illustration by Beatrice Elvery in Violet Russell's Heroes of the Dawn (1914)
- Abodes: Brú na Bóinne
- Weapons: Moralltach; Beagalltach; Gáe Buide; Gáe Derg
- Animals: Swan

Genealogy
- Parents: Dagda; Boann; Midir (foster-father)
- Siblings: Oghma an Cermait (brother)
- Consorts: Étaín; Caer Ibormeith
- Children: Diarmuid Ua Duibhne (foster-son)

Equivalents
- Celtic: Maponos
- Welsh: Mabon ap Modron

In Irish mythology, Aengus or Óengus is one of the Tuatha Dé Danann and probably originally a god associated with youth, love, summer and poetic inspiration. The son of The Dagda and Boann, Aengus is also known as Macan Óc ("the young boy" or "young son"), and corresponds to the Welsh mythical figure Mabon and the Celtic god Maponos. He plays a central role in five Irish myths.

== Name ==
In Old Irish his name is Óengus or Oíngus [ˈoːi̯ŋɡus], a name attested in Adomnán's Life of St Columba as Oinogus(s)ius. This is believed to come from a Proto-Celtic name meaning "true vigour". The medieval Dindsenchas derives it from "one desire", explaining that Boann gave him the name because her union with the Dagda had been her only desire. In Middle Irish this became Áengus, and in Modern Irish Aonghus [ˈeːnˠəsˠ], [ˈn̪ˠiːsˠ].

He is also known as Óengus Óc/Aengus Óg ("Aengus the young"), Mac ind Óc ("son of the young"), Maccan/Macán, or Mac Óc/Mac Óg ("young son").

According to Celticists John T. Koch and Kenneth H. Jackson, Aengus is also cognate to the Pictish Onuist/Unuist and Old Welsh Unust.

== Family ==
Aengus' parents were The Dagda and Boann, and his foster-father was variously Elcmar or Midir. He was said to have lived at Newgrange by the River Boyne, where he raised Manannán's blonde-haired daughter Curcog as his foster. In the folklore of Scotland, Aengus is the husband of Brigid and son of Beira, the Fairy Queen of Winter. His siblings include Aed, Cermait, Bodb Derg, and Brigid. Aengus is the foster-father and protector of Diarmuid Ua Duibhne of the Fianna. He rescues Diarmuid and Gráinne during their pursuit by the Fianna; after Diarmuid's death, Aengus takes his body back to the Brú na Bóinne where he breathes life into it when he wishes to speak with Diarmuid. According to Death Tales of the Tuatha de Danann, Aengus kills his stepfather Elcmar in retaliation for killing Midir. Aengus has a son named Nemhannach who is mentioned in the Battle of Ventry.

== Physical description ==
In a late folktale recorded in Scotland, the following physical description is provided:

"Then Angus mounted his white steed and rode eastward...He was clad in raiment of shining gold, and from his shoulders hung his royal robe of crimson which the wind uplifted and spread out in gleaming splendour athwart the sky."

Then a bard composed the following song about Angus:

Angus hath come - the young the fair,
The blue-eyed god with golden hair,
The god who to the world doth bring,
This morn the promise of the spring.

In Irish myths, Aengus is variously described in the following terms:

- expert in arms
- horseman
- sailor
- son of the Dagda
- of the many exploits
- of the battle squadrons (along with Aed and Cermait)
- red armed
- mighty and stern

== Mythology ==
=== Irish mythology ===
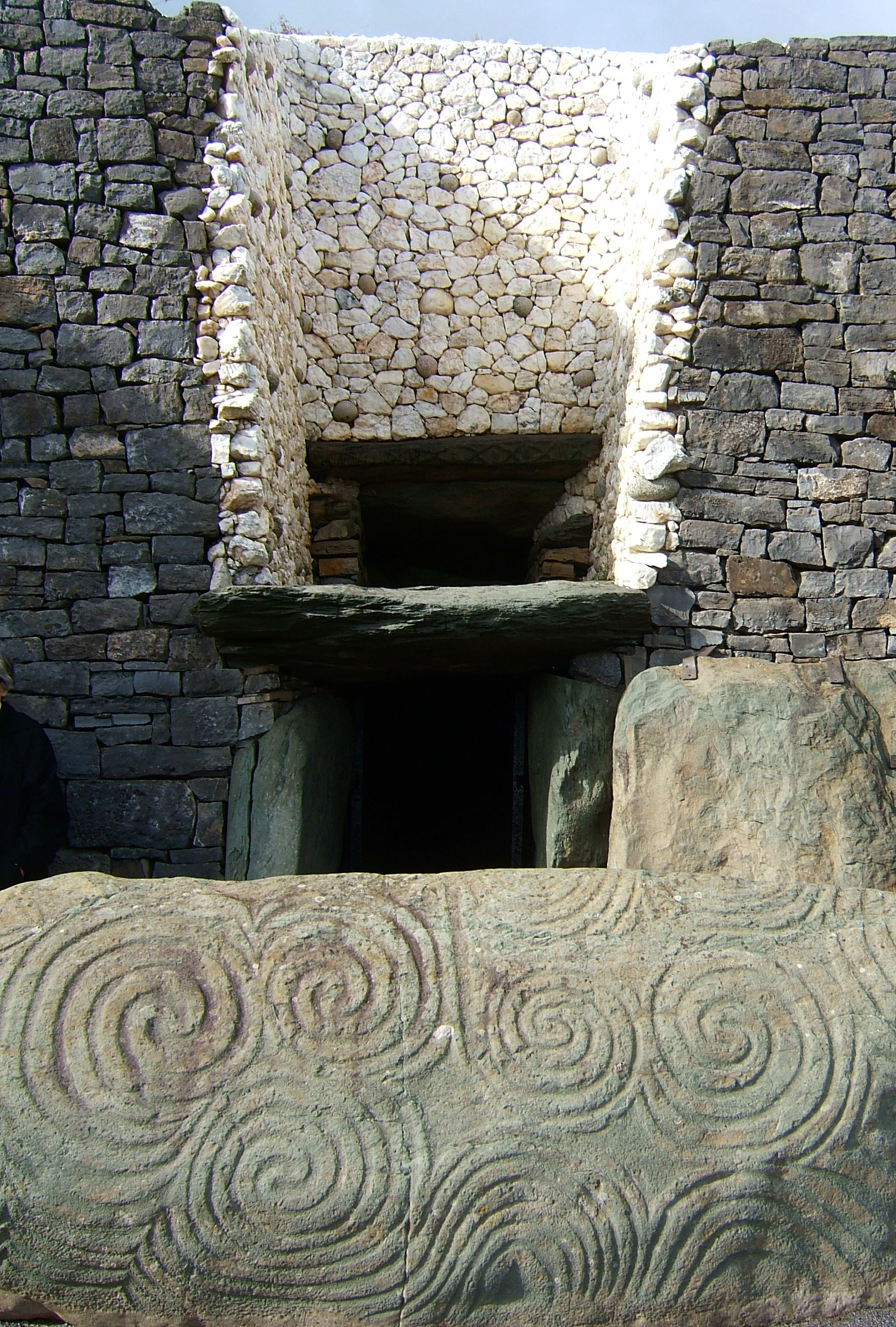
The entrance of Newgrange

The Dagda has an affair with Boann, the goddess of the River Boyne. She lives at Brú na Bóinne with her husband Elcmar. The Dagda impregnates her after sending Elcmar away on a one-day errand. To hide the pregnancy from Elcmar, the Dagda casts a spell on him, making "the sun stand still" so he will not notice the passing of time. Meanwhile, Boann gives birth to Aengus. Eventually, Aengus learns that the Dagda is his true father and asks him for a portion of land. In some versions of the tale—probably the original, from The Wooing of Etain—the Dagda helps Aengus take ownership of the Brú from Elcmar. Aengus asks and is given the Brú for láa ocus aidche; because in Old Irish this could mean either "a day and a night" or "day and night", Aengus claims it forever. Other versions have Aengus taking over the Brú from the Dagda himself by using the same trick. The Brú is then named Brug maic ind Óig after him. In The Wooing of Etain version, Midir is Aengus's foster-father.

It has been suggested that this tale represents the winter solstice illumination of Newgrange at Brú na Bóinne, during which the sunbeam (the Dagda) enters the inner chamber (the womb of Boann) when the sun's path stands still. The word solstice (Irish grianstad) means sun-standstill. The conception of Aengus may represent the 'rebirth' of the sun at the winter solstice, him taking over the Brú from an older god representing the growing sun taking over from the waning sun. Dáithí Ó hÓgáin suggested the tale probably dramatizes the idea "that the blooming of youth denies the process of aging - at the youthful stage of life time passes slowly and vitality seems to be permanent".

In The Fosterage of the House of the Two Pails, a similar story is related in which Manannán mac Lir, called the High King over all the Tuath Dé, convinces Aengus to cast a spell by reciting a poem called "Luck and Prosperity" to his foster-father Elcmar. The spell forces Elcmar from the Brú until "ogham and pillar, heaven and earth, and the sun and the moon have been blended together". Elcmar then tells Aengus that he would have given him the Brú if he had but asked, but due to Manannán's incantation, he and his people will face woe and madness for the rest of their days. In this telling of the story, Aengus expresses remorse for banishing Elcmar and his people.

Aengus kills Lugh Lámhfhada's poet for lying about his brother Ogma an Cermait. The poet claims that Ogma an Cermait had an affair with one of Lugh's wives.

In The Wooing of Etain, Aengus is able to partially lift a spell against Étaín, the horse goddess he won for his brother Midir. In a jealous rage, Midir's wife Fuamnach turns Étaín into a beautiful fly. Returning Étaín into her human form at night, Aengus makes her his lover until Fuamnach discovers the secret and drives Étaín away. Aengus kills his foster mother for her treachery.

In another tale Aengus falls in love with a girl he sees in his dreams. His mother, Boann, goddess of the River Boyne, and a cow goddess whose milk formed the Milky Way (Bealach na Bó Finne, or the White Cow's Way in Irish), searches Ireland for a year, then his father, the Dagda, does the same. Finally, King Bodb Derg of Munster finds her after a further year.

Aengus visits the lake of the Dragon's Mouth and finds 150 girls chained in pairs, including Caer Ibormeith, the girl from his dreams, among them. Every second Samhain, Caer and the other girls transform into swans for a year. Aengus is told he can marry Caer if he can identify her in swan form. Aengus turns himself into a swan and they fly away, singing beautiful music that puts all who listen to sleep for three days and nights.

In other legends Aengus is able to repair broken bodies and return them to life.

Similarities have been observed between Aengus and the Greek god Hermes.

=== Scottish folklore ===
In the folklore of Scotland, Angus is the fairest son of the Beira (the Cailleach), who rules over Winter. Aengus remains in Tír na nÓg all winter until he has a dream of Brigid that compels him to search the land for her. Brigid was held in captivity by the Fairy Queen who envied her beauty and forced Brigid to complete impossible chores. Angus finally leaves Tír na nÓg on his white steed by borrowing three days from August in order to search for Brigid. After searching everywhere, he eventually finds Brigid in Beira's underground palace just as Spring is beginning; when they meet on the first day of spring, flowers begin to blossom and grass grows, and Brigid's shabby clothing is transformed into white robes with silver spangles, and her hair is garlanded with spring and summer flowers. Angus marries Brigid in a wedding feast, which is disrupted by Beira, who chases them off with storm clouds on her black steed. Eventually Beira grows old and weak and has to return to the Well of Youth for rejuvenation, where she again falls asleep, and Angus and Bride become the King and Queen of summer.

In another folktale, it is related that Beira's son Angus contradicts all of his mother's orders in an effort to become King of the Universe. Angus is "weak minded and light headed," and in punishment Beira traps her son in the rocks, where he is forced to repeat the words of others (i.e. echo).

=== Possessions ===
Aengus owns a sword named Moralltach, the Great Fury, given to him by Manannan mac Lir. This he gave to his foster-son Diarmuid Ua Duibhne, along with a sword named Beagalltach, the Little Fury, and two spears of great power, Gáe Buide and Gáe Derg.

In Scottish folklore Aengus possesses a golden harp with silver strings, and when he plays it maidens and youths follow the music through the woods. He also kisses lovers, and when the lovers part, the kisses become invisible birds that follow the lovers home singing love songs and whispering memories in their ears. Similarly, in the Dindsenchas, Aengus shapes his kisses into four birds that followed Cairbre to mock him each day before sunrise. This mockery continues until Cairbre's druid enchants a tree from Fid Frosmuine with song, which causes the tree to grow high above all others and detain Aengus' birds.

In some legends, Aengus possesses a white horse, which he rides from the Land of Promise during the Spring. In the Dindsenchas, a tale called "Tuag Inber" is relayed in which Aengus provides Eochu and Ablend a swift horse while they are encamped with their cattle. He tells them to unbridle the horse in a meadow before it "sheds its water" and causes their deaths; Eochu and Ablend forget to unharness the horse, and it forms a well, around which Eochu builds confinement. The poem of Loch Ri is nearly identical to "Tuag Inber," except the character names differ and Aengus is replaced by Midir.

== Modern depictions ==
- Aengus appears in the Irish poet William Butler Yeats's poem "The Song of Wandering Aengus", which describes Aengus's endless search for his lover.
- Aengus Og appears in James Stephens' novel The Crock of Gold, where his aid is solicited by the Philosopher.
- In the Copper episode "Husbands and Fathers", Corcoran tells O'Brien to take Annie upstairs and tell her a story. O'Brien says to Annie, "I shall tell you about the Dream of Aengus and the Wooing of Etain."
- Aengus and his father the Dagda appear in Kate Thompson's young adult novel The New Policeman. Aengus acts as the protagonist's guide to Tír na nÓg and helps him restore it to its timeless state.
- Aengus is the primary antagonist of Hounded, Book 1 of The Iron Druid Chronicles.
- Aengus makes a brief appearance leading his father's funeral in Hellboy: The Wild Hunt. Although Angus himself never speaks, his father Dagda is a frequent character in other Hellboy stories.
- The name of Aengus appears also in the song of Johnny Flynn "Wandering Aengus" from album "Sillion" (2017).
- Aengus appears in season four of ScyFy's "The Magicians " television show, though he is portrayed as a puzzle-loving trickster god.
- Aengus as Maccan appears as a villain in three novels in the Outlanders (book series) written by Mark Ellis under the pen-name of James Axler.

== Texts ==
- Aislingi Oengusai original text from Egerton 1782 at Thesaurus Linguae Hibernicae.
- The Dream of Óengus: Aislinge Óenguso, ed. by Francis Shaw (Dublin: Brown & Nolan, 1934; repr. 1976)
- Tochmarc Étaíne: The Wooing of Étaín
- De Gabáil in t-Sída: The Taking of the Fairy Mound
- Aisling Óenguso: The Dream of Óengus
- Tóraigheacht Dhiarmada agus Ghráinne: The Pursuit of Diarmuid and Gráinne
- Wonder Tales from Scottish Myth and legend: The Coming of Angus and Bride
