= Hounded =

Hounded may refer to:

- Hounded (2001 film), an American comedy television film
- Hounded (2022 film), a British crime horror film
- Hounded (TV series), a 2010 British sitcom
- "Hounded" (Law & Order: UK), a 2010 television episode
- "Hounded" (The Walking Dead), a 2012 television episode
- Hounded (novel), a 2011 Iron Druid Chronicles novel by Kevin Hearne
