= The Seven Kennings =

Fantasy series by Kevin Hearne

The Seven Kennings Series
- Author: Kevin Hearne
- Language: English
- Publisher: Del Rey Books
- Published: 26 June 2018
- No. of books: 3

The Seven Kennings Series is a series of epic fantasy novels written by Kevin Hearne and published by Del Rey Books. All of the books have been recorded as audiobooks narrated by Luke Daniels and Xe Sands.

== Premise ==
An epic fantasy series set in a world inhabited by fire-wielding giants, bards that can shape-shift, and children that can speak to the more unusual inhabitants of the realm.

== Novels ==
A Plague of Giants (Del Rey, June 2018)

A Blight of Blackwings (Del Rey, Feb 2020)

A Curse of Krakens (Del Rey, Nov 2023)

== Reception ==
Reviews for A Plague of Giants include Publishers Weekly, Elitist Book Reviews, and the Tattooed Book Geek.

Reviews for A Blight of Blackwings include Kirkus Reviews, Reading Reality, and Waiting For Fairies.

Reviews for A Curse of Krakens include USA Today, the Storygraph, and Los Angeles Book Reviews.
