= Hexed (novel) =

2011 novel by Kevin Hearne

- Author: Kevin Hearne
- Cover artist: Gene Mollica
- Language: English
- Series: The Iron Druid Chronicles
- Genre: Urban Fantasy
- Publisher: Del Rey Books
- Publication date: 2011
- Publication place: United States
- Media type: Print
- Pages: 320
- ISBN: 978-0-345-52249-8
- Preceded by: Hounded
- Followed by: Hammered

Hexed is the second novel in Kevin Hearne's urban fantasy series, The Iron Druid Chronicles, and the sequel to Hounded. It was released on June 7, 2011. The third book, Hammered, was released on July 5, 2011.

== Plot introduction ==
Hexed features the continuing adventures of Atticus O'Sullivan, last of the Druids. In his world, an alternate history where magic, vampires, werewolves, Gods and other supernatural elements exist (albeit in hiding) O'Sullivan is often called upon to quell magical misunderstandings. In the aftermath of his defeat of the Celtic god of love, O'Sullivan has taken up a Druid initiate and hopes that life with his dog Oberon can return to some normalcy. Still wielding the magic sword known as Fragarach, the Answerer, O'Sullivan soon discovers that the notoriety that comes with dispatching a deity often does more harm than good. With two Celtic goddesses vying for his affections and allegiance, as well as two covens of witches hell bent on destroying each other O' Sullivan will need more than a magic sword and a quick wit to fend off evil.

The novel blends elements of mythology and urban fantasy.

== Characters ==
- Atticus O'Sullivan: The last of the Druids.
- Oberon: Atticus' Irish Wolfhound; he can communicate telepathically with Atticus.
- The Morrigan: Celtic Chooser of the Slain and goddess of war.
- Brighid: Celtic goddess of poetry, fire, and the forge.
- Granuaile: Atticus' Druid initiate.
- Malina Sokolowski: Leader of the Sisters of the Three Auroras Coven of Witches .
- Laksha Kulasekaran: Indian witch that possesses the bodies of others.
- Hallbjörn “Hal” Hauk: Atticus’ daytime lawyer who is also a werewolf.
- Leif Helgarson: Atticus' nighttime lawyer who is also a vampire.
- Widow MacDonagh: Atticus’ neighbor and friend.
- Rabbi Yosef: Member of the Hammer of Gods
- Coyote: Native American trickster god.

== Reception ==
Publishers Weekly praised Hearne for cranking "out action and quips at a frenzied pace" and called it a "fun and highly irreverent read." My Bookish Ways says that "Hexed is steeped in magic and wrapped in awesome" and that "it really doesn't get much better than this!"

Kelly Meding, author of Three Days to Dead called Hearne's work “A witty new fantasy series.”
