= Findabair =

Findabair or Finnabair (Modern Irish: Fionnabhair, pronounced [ˈfʲɪn̪ˠuːɾʲ]) was a daughter of Ailill and Queen Medb of Connacht in Irish mythology. The meaning of the name is "white phantom" (etymologically cognate with Gwenhwyfar, the original Welsh form of Guinevere). The Dindsenchas also mention a Findabair who is the daughter of Lugaid Laigde.

Though not considered a main character in the Táin, Finnabair occupies a crucial role in the epic. During the war of the Táin, her hand is offered to a succession of warriors in exchange for their sparring with Cú Chulainn. Ultimately her beauty and charms serve as the driving force behind the deaths of hundreds of men, even compelling Fer Diad to fight Cú Chulainn, his beloved foster-brother and best friend, in the single combat which leads to his death by Cú Chulainn's Gáe Bulg.

In the Táin Bó Cúailnge, Finnabair's husband Fráech (whose story is told in the Táin Bo Fraích) is killed by Cú Chulainn in a river. Afterwards, Medb repeatedly offers her daughter to prospective warriors, first to Nad Crantail, then to Láríne Mac Nóis, in a truce with Cú Chulainn with the condition that he not attack her army by night in exchange for his provision each day with a warrior with whom to engage in one-on-one combat. Finnabair is offered to Cú Chulainn when no warrior can be found. After he accepts, she is taken to him by a fool dressed as the king, not by Ailill himself. Upon discovering this, Cú Chulainn kills the fool and puts a pillar through him and a pillar through Finnabair's tunic, thus leaving two stones in that location, called the Fool's Stone and Finnabair's Stone.

Finnabair is subsequently offered to Fer Diad, "saying that he was her only darling, her chosen lover from among all the men in the world." The slaying of Fer Diad on Finnabair's account is greatly lamented by Cú Chulainn, and spurs him to speak many poems about him: “And Medb’s daughter Finnabair,/ that beautiful bait you hoped/ would be yours? You might as well/try to tie sand with a rope.” Her last and perhaps genuine love interest, Rochad Mac Faithemain, joined the forces of Ulster before the last great battle. To persuade him to not fight against Connacht, Medb uses her daughter's affection to strike a truce. Finnabair spends the night with Rochad, and eventually news of this reaches the 7 Kings of Munster, all of whom were also offered Finnabair for their allegiance. They take their complaints to Ailill's sons, which results in a battle and the eventual slaying of 700 men. Upon hearing how she has been used and had so many men die on her account, Finnabair drops dead of shame. "Hence the name Finnabair Sléibe, Finnabair of the Mountain."

In the Táin Bo Fráich, Findabair loved Fráech but he would not pay her dowry, until bribed by Medb, he agreed to take her in return for his help in battle against Ulster in the Táin Bó Cuailnge (Cattle Raid of Cooley).
