= Kevin Hearne =

American writer

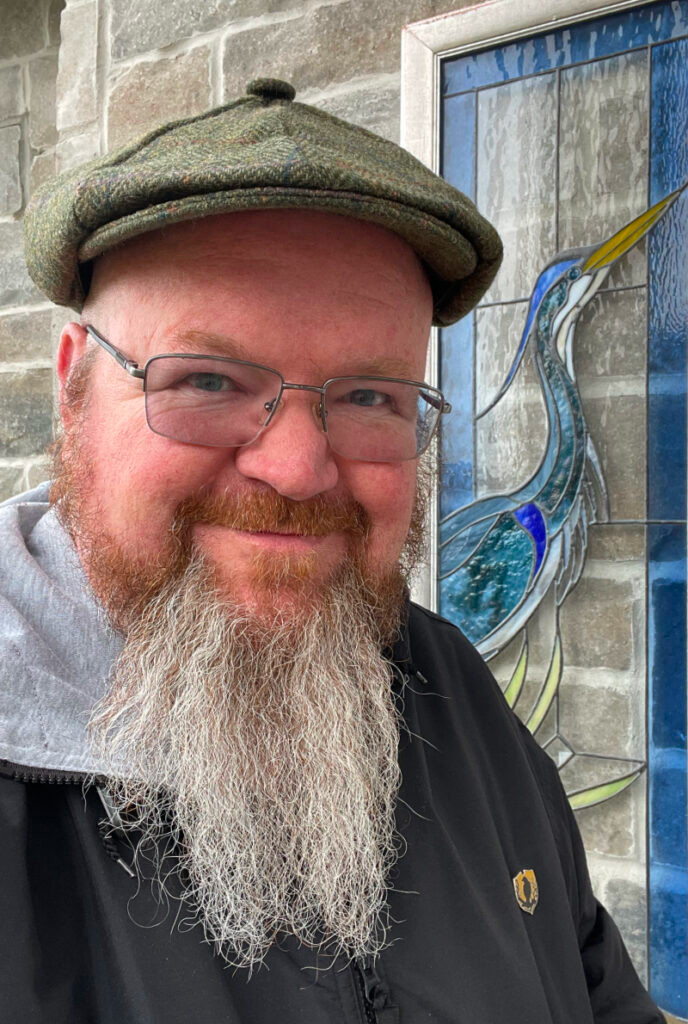
- Kevin Hearne in 2022
- Born: December 9, 1970 (age 55); Arizona, United States
- Occupation: Novelist
- Writing career
- Period: 2011–present
- Genres: Urban fantasy, science fiction
- Notable works: The Iron Druid Chronicles, Star Wars: Heir to the Jedi, The Seven Kennings
- Website: kevinhearne.com

Kevin Hearne (born December 9, 1970) is an American-Canadian fantasy novelist originally hailing from Arizona, now residing in Ontario.

Hearne is the author of twenty novels published by Del Rey. These include the New York Times bestselling series, The Iron Druid Chronicles, the Ink & Sigil series, the Seven Kennings trilogy, the Tales of Pell (co-authored with Delilah S. Dawson), and the 2015 Star Wars novel, Heir to the Jedi.

Hearne is a graduate of Northern Arizona University. He was a high school English teacher in Arizona, lived for five years in Colorado, and emigrated to Canada with his family in 2017. He became a Canadian citizen in 2022.

== Bibliography ==
=== The Iron Druid Chronicles universe ===
1. Hounded (Del Rey, May 2011)
2. Hexed (Del Rey, June 2011)
3. Hammered (Del Rey, July 2011)
4. Tricked (Del Rey, April 2012)
5. Trapped (Del Rey, November 2012)
6. Hunted (Del Rey, June 2013)
7. Shattered (Del Rey, June 2014)
8. Staked (Del Rey, January 2016)
9. Besieged (Del Rey, January 2017) (Short story collection that is considered book 9 of the series by the author and publisher, as the events of the stories are set between Staked and Scourged.)
10. Scourged (Del Rey, April 2018)

==== Oberon's Meaty Mysteries (novellas in the Iron Druid universe) ====
1. The Purloined Poodle (Subterranean, September 2016)
2. The Squirrel on the Train (Subterranean, 2017)
3. The Buzz Kill (Subterranean, in Death and Honey February 28, 2019)
4. The Chartreuse Chanteuse (in Canines & Cocktails, Horned Lark Press 2024)

==== Other Iron Druid novellas and short stories ====
Many Iron Druid stories that were previously published singly have now been collected in the trade paperback editions of the Iron Druid Chronicles, and their placement can be found in the series chronology. Here are those still available singly:

1. First Dangle (in First Dangle and Other Stories, ebook and audio, self-published)
2. Fire Hazard (an Oberon story in Heroic Hearts, anthology edited by Jim Butcher and Kerrie L. Hughes, Ace, May 2022)

=== Ink & Sigil ===
Set in the Iron Druid Universe but technically not part of the Chronicles; chronologically set one year after the events of Scourged.

1. Ink and Sigil (Del Rey, August 2020)
2. Paper and Blood (Del Rey, August 2021)
3. Candle & Crow (Del Rey, October 2024)

=== The Seven Kennings ===
1. A Plague of Giants (Del Rey, October 2017)
2. A Blight of Blackwings (Del Rey, February 2020)
3. A Curse of Krakens (Del Rey, June 2023)

=== Tales of Pell (with Delilah S. Dawson) ===
1. Kill the Farm Boy (Del Rey, July 2018)
2. No Country for Old Gnomes (Del Rey, April 2019)
3. The Princess Beard (Del Rey, October 2019)

=== Other novels ===
- Star Wars: Heir to the Jedi (Del Rey, March 2015)

=== Science fiction ===
- A Question of Navigation (Subterranean, 2020)
- The Hermit Next Door (Subterranean, 2024)
