= Fuamnach =

Character in Irish mythology

Fúamnach, or Fuamnach, is Midir's first wife and a witch of the Tuatha Dé Danann in the medieval Irish text Tochmarc Étaíne ("The Wooing of Étaín"). The text describes her as being intelligent (gáeth), cunning (trebar) and "versed in the knowledge and power of the Túatha Dé Danand", explaining that her fosterfather had been the wizard druid Bresal Etarlám. She is said to be of the progeny (clann) of Béothach son of Iardanél, who is probably identical with Béothach son of Iarbonel, the father of the Túatha Dé Danann in the Lebor Gabála Érenn.

== Summary ==
When Midir fell in love with Étaín and married her, Fúamnach got so jealous that she cast several spells on her as soon as the couple arrived in Midir's residence in Brí Léith:

- First, having welcomed the couple and having seated Étáin in the centre of the house, she struck her wand of scarlet rowan (cáerthann) on her, transforming her rival into a pool of water. When Étaín changed from being a pool to a worm and subsequently a beautiful scarlet fly (cuil corcrai), she joined Midir once more as his companion.
- Second, on a visit to Midir (escorted by Lug, the Dagdae and Ogmae), Fúamnach announced that she would drive Étaín away from him and employed a spell which she had learnt from her fosterfather: she conjured up a mighty wind which blew Étaín through the air for the duration of seven years, after which she came to Óengus (Mac Óc) in the Brug. He lovingly kept her with him in a specially designed, protective bower (grianán).
- Third, on discovering what had come of Étaín, Fúamnach deceived Mac Óc into coming to Brí Léith on the pretext that she desired to establish peace between them. However, as Mac Óc was on his way, Fúamnach travelled to the Brug by an alternative route and conjured up yet another wind which forced Étaín to roam another seven years without setting foot on land. Étaín finally arrived at a house in Ulster, where she fell into the cup of the (anonymous) wife of the warrior Étar. As she emptied her cup, she swallowed Étaín and miraculously gave (re-)birth to Étaín as her own daughter (the tale goes on to say that Étaín grew up and met a mysterious horseman who had been looking for her).

Fúamnach did not live long to see the fruits of her work. When Mac Óc met Midir at Brí Léith, he discovered what deceptive scheme had led him there. Mac Óc followed Fúamnach's trail to the house of her fosterfather Bresal and there struck off her head, which he carried as a trophy back to the Brug.

== Name ==
The name Fúamnach may be an adjective noun derived from fúaimm "noise, sound". To cite one example, the dindsenchas poem on Nás speaks of fáidiud find-gel fúamnach Fáil ("the lamentation of the fair-skinned vocal women of Fáil"). The form fúaimnech is also attested as a personal name for Fúaimnech, daughter of Conn Cétchathach, who appears in the legal tract Mellbretha.
