= Nuada Airgetlám =

First king of the Tuatha Dé Danann in Irish mythology

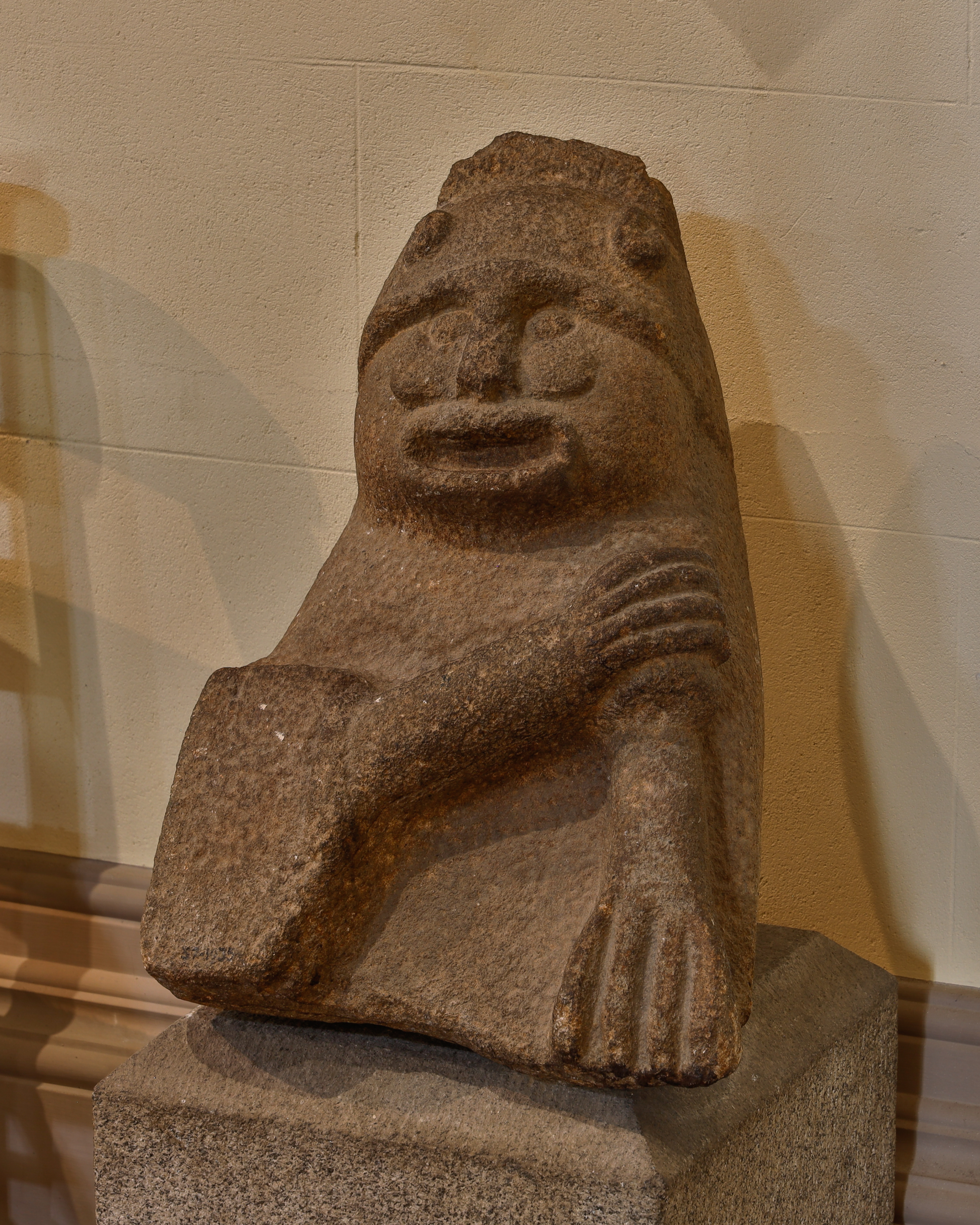
- The Tandragee Idol, which may represent Nuada

Genealogy
- Siblings: Dian Cécht; Goibniu
- Offspring: Caicher; Ethadon

Equivalents
- Welsh: Lludd Llaw Eraint

In Irish mythology, Nuada or Nuadu (modern spelling: Nuadha), known by the epithet Airgetlám (Airgeadlámh, meaning "silver hand/arm"), was the first king of the Tuatha Dé Danann. He is also called Nechtan and Nuadu Necht, and is sometimes believed to be Elcmar, husband of Boann. He is mostly known from the tale in which he loses his arm or hand in battle, and thus his kingship, but regains it after being magically healed by Dian Cécht. Nuada is thought to have been a god and is related to the British and Gaulish god Nodens, who is associated with hunting and fishing. His Welsh equivalent is Nudd or Lludd Llaw Eraint.

== Etymology ==
Middle Irish Núada/Núadu means hero or champion, which is "probably a euhemerized name for the deity." The name Nuada may derive from a Celtic stem *noudont- or *noudent-, which J. R. R. Tolkien suggested was related to a Germanic root meaning "acquire, have the use of", earlier "to catch, entrap (as a hunter)". Making the connection with Nuada and Lludd's hand, he detected "an echo of the ancient fame of the magic hand of Nodens the Catcher". Similarly, Julius Pokorny derives the name from a Proto-Indo-European root *neu-d- meaning "acquire, utilise, go fishing". Matasovic says that the formation from Proto-Celtic *nawito- meaning "need, compel" is quite difficult.

== Description ==
Nuada was king of the Tuatha Dé Danann before they came to Ireland. They made contact with the Fir Bolg, the then-inhabitants of the island, and Nuada sought from them half of the island for the Tuatha Dé, which their king rejected. Both peoples made ready for war, and in an act of chivalry allowed their numbers and armaments to be inspected by the opposing side to allow for a truly fair battle. During this first great battle at Mag Tuired, Nuada lost an arm in combat with the Fir Bolg champion Sreng. Nuada's ally, Aengaba of Norway, then fought Sreng, sustaining a mortal wound, while the Dagda protected Nuada. Fifty of the Dagda's soldiers carried Nuada from the field. The Tuatha Dé gained the upper hand in the battle, so to speak, but Sreng later returned to challenge Nuada to single combat. Nuada accepted, on the condition that Sreng fought with one arm tied up. Sreng refused, but by this point the battle was won and the Fir Bolg all but vanquished. The Tuatha Dé then decided to offer Sreng one quarter of Ireland for his people instead of the one half offered before the battle, and he chose Connacht.

Having lost his arm, Nuada was no longer eligible for kingship because of the Tuatha Dé tradition that their king must be physically perfect, and he was replaced as king by Bres, a half-Fomorian prince renowned for his beauty and intellect. The Fomorians were mythological enemies of the people of Ireland, often equated with the mythological "opposing force" such as the Greek Titans to the Olympians, and during Bres's reign they imposed great tribute on the Tuatha Dé, who became disgruntled with their new king's oppressive rule and lack of hospitality. By this time Nuada had his lost arm replaced by a working silver one by the physician Dian Cecht and the wright Creidhne (and later with a new arm of flesh and blood by Dian Cecht's son Miach). Bres was removed from the kingship, having ruled for seven years, and Nuada was restored. He ruled for twenty more years.

Bres, aided by the Fomorian Balor of the Evil Eye, attempted to retake the kingship by force, and war and continued oppression followed. When the youthful and vigorous Lugh joined Nuada's court, the king realised the multi-talented youth could lead the Tuatha Dé against the Fomorians, and stood down in his favour. The second Battle of Mag Tuired followed. Nuada was killed and beheaded in battle by Balor, but Lugh avenged him by killing Balor and led the Tuatha Dé to victory.

Nuada's great sword was one of the Four Treasures of the Tuatha Dé Danann, brought from one of their four great cities. In The Fate of the Children of Tuireann Nuada is described as having a one-eyed door-keeper, whose eye is replaced by the brother healers Miach and Oirmiach with that of a cat.

== Relationships ==
Nuada may be the same figure as Nechtan and Elcmar, who are described as the husbands of Boann. In the medieval texts, Nuada is described as having two brothers, Dian Cécht and Goibniu. Ethadon is named as one of Nuada's sons and Gaible his grandson. Gaible stole a bundle of sticks from the Dagda's daughter (named as Ainge), and where he hurled them, a fair wood grew. In The Book of Invasions, Nuada is given a son named Caicher and a grandson Uillend.

== Legacy ==
Characters who share the name Nuada include the later High Kings Nuadu Finn Fáil and Nuadu Necht, and Nuada, the maternal grandfather of Fionn mac Cumhaill. A rival to Conn of the Hundred Battles was Mug Nuadat ("Nuada's Slave"). The Delbhna, a people of early Ireland, had a branch called the Delbhna Nuadat who lived in County Roscommon. The present day town of Maynooth in County Kildare is named after Nuada (its Irish name is Maigh Nuad, meaning The plain of Nuada). The Pre-Patrician section of the Annals of Inisfallen have an incomplete entry on Nuada. There, in an entry on the division of Ireland between the sons of Érimón it says, "Every family [...] subsequently in Ireland is of the race of Nuada on account of his maintenance by his kinsmen and on account of his patience."

== Mythological parallels ==
Nuada's name is cognate with that of Nodens, a British deity associated with the sea and healing who was equated with the Roman Mars, and with Nudd, a Welsh mythological figure. It is likely that another Welsh figure, Lludd Llaw Eraint (Lludd of the Silver Hand), derives from Nudd Llaw Eraint by alliterative assimilation. The Norse god Týr is another deity equated with Mars who lost a hand. Sabazios is another Indo-European deity associated with a sacred hand.

Preceded by Bres	High King of Ireland; AFM 1890–1870 BC; FFE 1470–1447 BC	Succeeded by Lug
