= Nad Crantail =

Figure in Irish legends

Nad Crantail is one of the warriors that Cú Chulainn fights with in single combat to delay Medb's army in attacking Ulster in the Táin Bó Cuailnge (Cattle Raid of Cooley). In looking for someone who might be a match for Cú Chulainn, Medb sends for Nad Crantail. He will only agree to fight if promised Medb's daughter Findabair, which Medb agrees to. Cú Chulainn is warned of his impending fight by Lugaid, but is unconcerned. Cú Chulainn is hunting birds when Nad Crantail comes to fight him wielding nine holly stakes. Nad Crantail throws all nine stakes at Cú Chulainn, but Cú Chulainn manages to jump up onto the point of each stake. While the last of the nine stakes is being fired at Cú Chulainn, the birds he is hunting fly away. He chases after the birds, but appeared to everyone else to be fleeing from the fight. When confronted with this, Cú Chulainn claims that Nad Crantail had not come to fight him with a real weapon, and he would not kill someone who was not armed. He issues a challenge for Nad Crantail to come fight him the next day. When Nad Crantail meets Cú Chulainn for that fight, he sees that Cú Chulainn is just a “beardless boy” and refuses to fight him. In response to this, Cú Chulainn claims not to be himself, lures Nad Craintail away, and dons a fake beard made from blackberries. Now that Cú Chulainn has a beard Nad Crantail is willing to fight him. They agree on a fight consisting of spear throwing, where only upward dodging is allowed. Nad Crantail takes the first shoot, but Cú Chulainn jumps over it. Next, Cú Chulainn throws a spear that hits Nad Crantail in the head. After this, Nad Crantail requests to be allowed to tell his sons about his hidden treasure before Cú Chulainn finishes him off. Cú Chulainn agrees, and after Nad Crantail goes back to his camp to speak to his sons, he comes back to finish the fight. He throws his sword at Cú Chulainn, which is dodged by jumping. Cú Chulainn then enters a torque state, landing on Nad Craintail’s shield before cutting off his head. Cú Chulainn further cuts up Nad Craintail’s body into four pieces before chanting a verse to mark the occasion.
