= Hounded (novel) =

Book by Kevin Hearne

- Author: Kevin Hearne
- Cover artist: Gene Mollica
- Language: English
- Series: The Iron Druid Chronicles
- Genre: Urban fantasy
- Publisher: Del Rey Books
- Publication date: May 3, 2011
- Publication place: United States
- Media type: Print
- Pages: 304
- ISBN: 978-0-345-52247-4
- Followed by: Hexed

Hounded is the first novel in Kevin Hearne's urban fantasy series, The Iron Druid Chronicles. It was released on May 3, 2011. The sequel, Hexed was released on June 7, 2011.

== Plot ==
Hounded introduces the character of Atticus O'Sullivan and his world, a secret history where magic, vampires, werewolves, gods, and other supernatural elements exist (albeit in hiding). O'Sullivan, the last Druid and proprietor of Third Eye Books and Herbs occult shop, comes into contact with many of the supernatural characters of his home city of Tempe, Arizona. He draws his power from the earth, possesses a sharp wit, and wields an even sharper magical sword known as Fragarach, the Answerer.

And for Hounded (book one), this particular sword sets off a series of godly events. The novel blends elements of mythology and urban fantasy.

== Characters ==
- Atticus O'Sullivan: The last of the Druids.
- Oberon: Atticus's Irish Wolfhound; he can communicate telepathically with Atticus.
- The Morrígan: Celtic Chooser of the Slain and goddess of art.
- Aenghus Óg: Celtic god of love who has been pursuing Atticus to retrieve Fragarach.
- Flidais: Goddess of the hunt.
- Radomila: Leader of the Tempe Coven
- Emily: The youngest of the thirteen witches in the Tempe Coven.
- Malina Sokolowski: Witch of the Tempe Coven, guardian of Emily.
- Gunner Magnusson: Alpha leader of the Tempe, Arizona werewolf pack.
- Hallbjörn “Hal” Hauk: Atticus' daytime lawyer, a werewolf.
- Leif Helgarson: Atticus' nighttime lawyer, a vampire.
- Widow MacDonagh: Atticus' neighbor and friend.
- Granuaile: Bartender at Rúla Búla who is possessed by an Indian witch.
- Brighid: Goddess of poetry, fire, and the forge; Aenghus Óg's sister and Bres' wife.
- Bres: Brighid's husband and former king of the Tuatha Dé Danann.
- Coyote: Native American trickster god.

== Reception ==
The book was received well by critics. Publishers Weekly called it, “a superb urban fantasy debut.”

Several other authors have also praised Hearne's first book. Nicole Peeler said that Kevin breathed “new life into old myths,” and created “a world both eerily familiar and startlingly original.” Ari Marmell called it “a page-turning and often laugh-out-loud funny caper through a mix of the modern and the mythic.”
