= Bebhionn (moon) =

Moon of Saturn

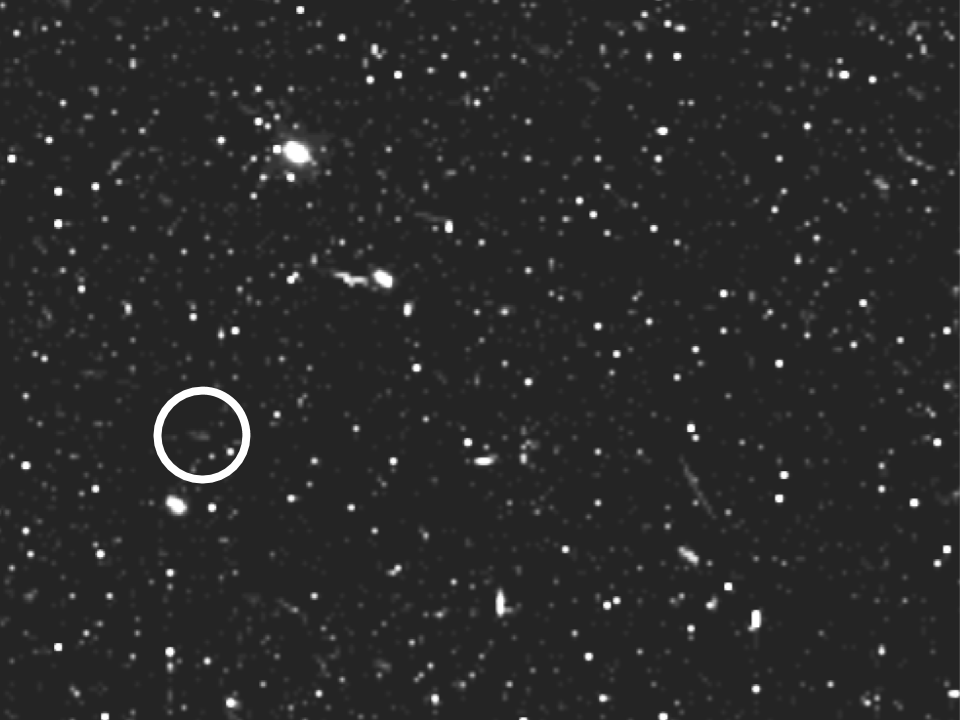
- Bebhionn imaged by the Cassini spacecraft in May 2017

Discovery
- Discovered by: Scott S. Sheppard; David C. Jewitt; Jan T. Kleyna; Brian G. Marsden
- Discovery date: 2004

Designations
- Designation: Saturn XXXVII
- Pronunciation: /ˈbeɪvɪn/ BAY-vin
- Named after: Béibhinn
- Alternative names: S/2004 S 11

Orbital characteristics
- Semi-major axis: 17119000 km
- Eccentricity: 0.469
- Orbital period (sidereal): −834.8 days
- Inclination: 35.01°
- Satellite of: Saturn
- Group: Gallic group

Physical characteristics
- Mean diameter: 6+50% −30% km
- Synodic rotation period: 16.33±0.03 h
- Albedo: 0.06 (assumed)
- Spectral type: B–V = 0.61 ± 0.10, V–R = 0.51 ± 0.13
- Apparent magnitude: 24.1
- Absolute magnitude (H): 15.0

Bebhionn (/ˈbeɪvɪn/), also known as Saturn XXXVII, is a small, irregular natural satellite of Saturn. Its discovery was announced by Scott S. Sheppard, David C. Jewitt, Jan Kleyna, and Brian G. Marsden on 4 May 2005 from observations taken between 12 December 2004 and 9 March 2005.

Bebhionn is about 6 kilometres in diameter and orbits Saturn at an average distance of 16,898 Mm in 820.130 days at an inclination of 41° to the ecliptic (18° to Saturn's equator) and with an eccentricity of 0.469. The rotation period of Bebhionn was measured at 16.33±0.03 hours by the ISS camera of the Cassini spacecraft. Bebhionn's light curve reflects an elongated shape with large variations in brightness, making it a leading candidate for a contact binary or binary moon.

== Name ==
The moon was named in April 2007 after Béibhinn (Béḃinn), an early Irish goddess of birth, who was renowned for her beauty. In Irish, Béibhinn/Béḃinn is pronounced [ˈbʲeːvʲiːn̠ʲ] (southern accents, English approximation /ˈbeɪviːn/ BAY-veen) or [ˈbʲeːvʲɪn̠ʲ] (northern accents, English approximation /ˈbeɪvɪn/ BAY-vin). The spelling "bh" (older "ḃ") indicates that the second consonant is softened to a "v" sound. The extra "o" in the unusual spelling Bebhionn suggests that the final "nn" should be broad [n̪ˠ], but is not itself pronounced. The name is still pronounced as a compound (and thus sometimes spelled Bé Binn etc.), so the unstressed vowel is not reduced to a schwa.
