= Midir =

Irish mythological figure

In the Mythological Cycle of early Irish literature, Midir (Old Irish), Midhir (Modern Irish) or Mider was a son of the Dagda of the Tuatha Dé Danann. After the Tuatha Dé were defeated by the Milesians, he lived in the sidh of Brí Léith (believed to be Ardagh Hill, Co. Longford). The name Midir may come from the old Irish word for a judge, midithir.

== Description ==
In Tochmarc Étaíne, Midir appears on a brown steed wearing a green mantle and red embroidered tunic with a golden brooch reaching from shoulder to shoulder, a silver shield with a rim of gold on his back with a silver strip and gold boss. He has bright yellow hair, a five pronged spear, and a fillet of gold on his head. When Midir appears suddenly in the midst of Eochaid Airem's court, the remark is made, “He was fair at all times, but on that night he was fairer.”

Elsewhere in Tochmarc Étaíne, the following description of Midir is provided:

A purple tunic about him, and golden yellow hair on him to the edge of his shoulders. A shining blue eye in his head. A five-pointed spear in one hand, a white-bossed shield in the other, with golden gems thereon. Eochaid was silent, for he was unaware of his being in Tara the night before, and the courts had not been opened at that hour.

== Family ==
Midir is traditionally the son of The Dagda. In the First Recension of the Lebor Gabála and in the Metrical Dindsenchas, Midir of Brí Léith is made the "son of Induí son of Échtach son of Etarlam". As a son of Induí, called "king of the north country, lord of horse breeding peoples," Midir would be brother or half-brother to the war-god Neit and nephew of Nuada, who is called the son of Échtach son of Etarlam.

Midir's wife is Fuamnach, who is either beheaded by Midir's foster-son Aengus or otherwise killed by Manannan Mac Lir. Midir's daughters included Bri Bruachbrecc and Ogniad (or Oicnis), who was the mother of Sigmall Cael. Midir's sons include Lir, the father of Manannan, and his foster-son is Aengus, who elsewhere is called the foster-son of Elcmar. According to the Dindsenchas (Cnogba), Midir abducts Elcmar's daughter Englec, to the dismay of Aengus, who is in love with her.

== Mythology ==
=== Tochmarc Étaíne ===
Midir is one of the leading characters in the Old Irish saga Tochmarc Étaíne ("The Wooing of Étaín"), which makes leaps through time from the age of the Túatha Dé Danann to the time of Eochaid Airem, High King of Ireland. Midir is the husband of Fúamnach but falls in love with Étaín, and receives the help of his foster-son Aengus (also Oengus) to make her his new bride. Fuamnach's vengeance is provoked against the young new wife, causing her a number of disgraces until after several transformations (including water, a worm, and a fly) Étaín fell into the drink of another woman and is reborn.

Étaín later marries Eochaid Airem, at that time the High King of Ireland. Far from giving up, Midir makes an attempt to bring his lover back home, going to see the king and challenging him to many games of fidchell or chess; Midir's chessboard is described as being silver with golden men and jeweled corners. Eochaid wins all but the last game, and Midir gives him fifty horses with red, spotted heads, fifty boars, a vat of blackthorn, fifty gold hilted swords, fifty ivory hilted swords, fifty red eared cows with white eared calves, and fifty red-headed rams with three horns and three heads each. However, Midir wins the final game and requests a kiss from Étaín as his prize.

After defending his home against Midir, who effortlessly enters, Eochaid reluctantly allows Midir his kiss, but Midir turns himself and Étaín into swans who fly out of the royal residence. Eochaid refuses to accept the loss of his wife and pursues Midir to the elfmounds. When Eochaid finally begins excavating Bri Leith, Midir confronts him and offers him another game. Midir uses his power to make fifty women look like Étaín and offers the king the opportunity to choose only one. Eochaid incorrectly chooses his own daughter and loses Étaín forever, also fathering a daughter upon his own daughter in the process.

=== Oidheadh Chlainne Lir ===
In the Fate of the Children of Lir, Midir is referred to as "Midhir the Proud" and is passed over for the kingship of the Tuatha Dé Danann along with Lir, Aengus Og, and Ilbhreach in favor of Bodb Derg, the Dagda's eldest son.

=== Aigidecht Aitherni ===
Midir figures in a brief anecdote about the stingy poet Athirne, son of Ferchertne, in the heroic age portrayed by the Ulster Cycle. The story, entitled Aigidecht Aitherni ("The Guesting of Athirne") in one manuscript, recounts that Athirne came to Midir's house in Brí Léith and fasted against him until he obtained Midir's three magical cranes which stood outside his house denying entry or hospitality to anyone who approached. Moreover, "[a]ny of the men of Ireland who saw them [the cranes] could not face equal combat on that day."

=== Yellow Book of Lecan ===
One of Midir's eyes was knocked out with a twig of hazel during a quarrel that broke out between two companies of youths at the Brug. It is unclear in the story who threw the hazel twig, although Midir intercepted among the youths so that Aengus could avoid getting too close to Elcmar. Midir's eye was healed by Dian Cecht, although elsewhere it is stated that Etain healed his eye from the well of Loch Da Lig.

=== Other references ===
Midir also interfered when Fráech attempted to woo Treblainne.

== In popular culture ==
The video game Dark Souls III features a hidden dragon boss by the name of Darkeater Midir in the game's 2nd DLC. The video game Fire Emblem: Genealogy of the Holy War has a minor playable character named Midir in the first generation. The videogame Final Fantasy 7 the village mideel is a reference to this god.
