= Mellbretha =

Early Irish legal text on sports

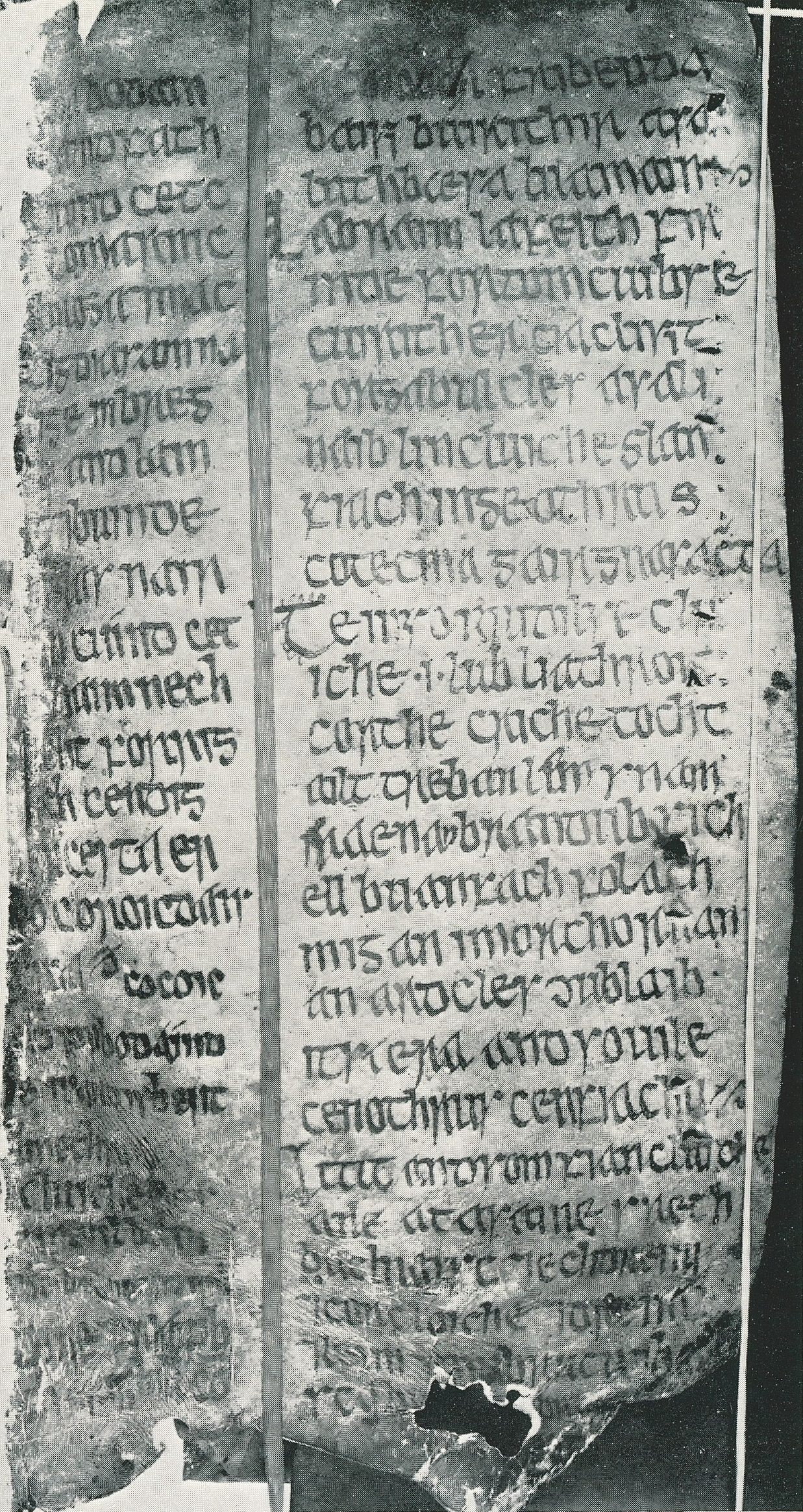
The fragment of Mellbretha found in the binding of Dublin, Trinity College, MS 1363

Mellbretha (Old Irish for "Sport-judgements") is a fragmentarily preserved early Irish legal text on the law of sports. The surviving fragment deals with accidental injuries, and the liability they incur, in various sports. It gives the names of twenty-five sports, some quite obscure, but including such games as hurling and fidchell.

== Manuscripts ==
A fragment of Mellbretha was discovered in 1968 by Anne and William O'Sullivan on a piece of scrap vellum used in the binding of Dublin, Trinity College, MS 1363. D. A. Binchy edited and translated this fragment, connecting it with some unattributed quotes in a legal commentary on liability for injuries caused by games, preserved in British Library, MS Egerton 88. Liam Breatnach disagrees with Binchy about which of these quotations belong to Mellbretha.

== Contents ==
Mellbretha begins with an accessus ad auctores schema, giving a pseudo-historical account of the place, time, author, and cause of the text. Binchy's translation of this foreword is as follows:

The place of this book was Tara, its time that of Conn Cétchathach, its author Bodainn, and the reason for composing it the confrontation or encounter of the two teams of boys on the plain of Bregia on November-day; and Patrick [subsequently] blessed (i.e. approved of it) and supplied what was lacking in it.

Saint Patrick frequently features in accounts of the origin of Irish law texts, as a generator and redactor of early Irish law, putting it in agreement with Christian teaching. The story about the encounter between teams of boys in the time of Conn Cétchathach appears nowhere else in Irish literature. Binchy conjectured that it was "an echo of a lost saga". The jurist Bodainn is also unknown outside this text. The title Mellbretha is revealed by several lines which give etymological variations on the meaning of Mellbretha. Binchy was unable to find any reference to the text's name in early Irish literature, although it is mentioned in John Lynch's Cambrensis Eversus (1662) (though Lynch misapprehended the nature of the work).

The preserved fragment of the Mellbretha deals with the liability for accidental injuries during games. (Note: According to William Sayers, it may "lay claim to be the earliest work in a European vernacular to treat of games and sports in a legal framework".) In Irish law, an injured party could demand payment of medical expenses, food, and rent (called "sick-maintenance") under certain circumstances. In delineating these circumstances, the Mellbretha divides games into three types: ruidilsi cluiche ("games with immunity"), for which there is no right to a fine or sick-maintenance after accidental injury; fianchluichi ("competitive games"), (Note: The translation of fianchluichi as "competitive games" is Binchy's. William Sayers disfavours this translation, insofar as it "downplay[s] the true para-military nature of these activities".) for which there is a right to sick-maintenance; and colchluichi ("guilty games"), about which the text is unclear, but presumably incurring a fine and sick-maintenance. This three-fold division is reproduced in the commentaries, but with more variance than is presented here.

In giving these categories, the Mellbretha gives twenty-five games as examples. Identifying these games comes with some difficulty, as they are described in a circumlocutory manner, and some of the technical terms are hapax legomena. Many of the "games with immunity" are childhood games (such as juggling). However, others are games of both adulthood and childhood, such as hurling, and moreover board-games such as Fidchell and Brandub are listed in this category, though they appear to have been exclusive to adults. The "competitive games" have a more paramilitary flavour (such as horse-riding and pelting). The "guilty games" are mostly quite obscure, but generally appear to be reckless activities, such as "throwing a spear into an assembly".
