= Durrow =

Durrow may refer to:

== Ireland ==
- Durrow, County Offaly, a village in County Offaly
  - Durrow Abbey, a historic monastery near the village
- Durrow, County Laois, a town in County Laois
  - Castle Durrow, 18th century country house in the town
- Durrow, County Kilkenny, a civil parish in the barony of Galmoy, Co. Kilkenny; transferred to Queen's County (Laois) in the 1840s
- Durrow, County Westmeath (civil parish), a civil parish in County Westmeath
- Book of Durrow, illuminated manuscript gospel book, c. 700 AD

== Other uses ==
- Heidi W. Durrow, American novelist (born 1969)
