= The Iron Druid Chronicles =

Series of novels by Kevin Hearne

- Author: Kevin Hearne
- Language: English
- Publisher: Del Ray Books
- Published: 2011

The Iron Druid Chronicles is a series of urban fantasy novels, novellas, novelettes and short stories, written by Kevin Hearne and published by Del Rey Books. All the books, including short stories, have recorded audiobooks narrated by Luke Daniels (for the US) and Christopher Ragland (for the UK market.)

== Background ==
The series is set in our world—the first two books are set in Tempe, Arizona—where supernatural creatures exist, including witches, vampires, werewolves, demons, elementals, and deities from various mythologies. The series is told in the first-person point of view. In the beginning, the narrative is described exclusively by ancient druid Atticus O'Sullivan (a.k.a. Siodhachan O Suileabhain), owner of the occult bookshop Third Eye Books and Herbs, as he becomes embroiled in the day-to-day struggle of gods, goddesses, and other supernatural creatures. Granuaile and Owen Kennedy (archdruid to Atticus) narrate later chapters after they become a larger part of the story.

== Novels ==
- 1. Hounded (May 2011)
- 2. Hexed (June 2011)
- 3. Hammered (July 2011)
- 4. Tricked (April 2012)
- 5. Trapped (November 2012)
- 6. Hunted (June 2013)
- 7. Shattered (June 2014) [First Hardcover Release]
- 8. Staked (January 26, 2016)
- 8.5 Besieged (July 11, 2017) - Nine short stories narrated by Atticus O'Sullivan (the main character), Owen Kennedy (Atticus's archdruid), Granuaile MacTiernan (Atticus's former apprentice), and Perun (the Slavic god of thunder). According to the official website, the collection is the length of a novel and should be considered 8.5 in the series. The novel was announced on Twitter in October 2016 by Owen Kennedy, the fictional character from the Iron Druid Chronicles who is Atticus's archdruid.
- 9. Scourged (April 5, 2018) - Final novel in the Iron Druid series.

== Short fiction ==
- "The Grimoire of the Lamb" (IDC, #0.4) (published May 2013) A novella that appears as its own ebook and in the Hexed ebook. A collector buys a rare tome from Atticus.
- "Clan Rathskeller" (IDC, #0.5) (2011) A bonus short story in the Hounded ebook. Some real gnomes serve as Santa's helpers at a shopping plaza.
- "Kaibab Unbound" (IDC, #0.6) (2011) A bonus short story in the Hounded ebook. This was later published in Two Tales of the Iron Druid Chronicles.
- "Test of Mettle" (IDC, #3.1) (2011) Available at https://kevinhearne.com/wp-content/uploads/2010/12/A-Test-of-Mettle.pdf on Hearne's website, and in the Hammered ebook. Granuaile works on her own desert project. This was later published in Two Tales of the Iron Druid Chronicles.
- "Eye of Horus" (IDC, #4.1), Besieged collection (2017). Atticus shares this story early on during Granuaile's training period, in between Tricked and the novella "Two Ravens and One Crow."
- "Goddess at the Crossroads" (IDC, #4.2) (2015) A novellette featured in the anthology, A Fantasy Medley 3. Also included in the Besieged collection. One night's dark encounter with the cult of Hecate serves as inspiration for Shakespeare's witches in Macbeth. Atticus shares this story during Granuaile's training period, after Tricked but before the novella "Two Ravens and One Crow."
- "Two Ravens and One Crow" (IDC, #4.5) (2012) This novella appears as its own titled ebook and in the Hunted ebook. It takes place 6 years after the events of Tricked and deals with important details between that book and Trapped.
- “The Demon Barker of Wheat Street” (IDC, #4.6) A novellette taking place a couple of weeks after the events of "Two Ravens and One Crow". It was featured in the anthology, Carniepunk (released in July 2013), and a "slightly revised and expanded version" appeared in the Besieged collection (2017). Granuaile, Atticus and Oberon go to a carnival while they wait to see her mother.
- "Gold Dust Druid" (IDC, #4.7), novelette included in the Besieged collection (2017).
- "The Chapel Perilous" (IDC #4.8) (2013) A short story published in the fantasy anthology, Unfettered, and edited by Shawn Speakman. While framed as a story being told by Atticus to his apprentice 8 years after the events of Tricked, it involves events that occurred in 6th century Wales. This was later released in First Dangle and Other Stories (2019).
- "A Prelude to War" (IDC #7.5) (Released May 2015) Featured in the anthology, Three Slices. Also featured as an appendix in the Orbit paperback of Staked (IDC #8.) The story takes place one week after the events of Shattered. Atticus seeks out a tyromancer, while Granuaile reevaluates her weapons.
- "The Bogeyman of Boora Bog" (IDC #8.1), in the Besieged collection. Narrated by Archdruid Owen Kennedy.
- "Cuddle Dungeon" (IDC #8.2), in the Besieged collection (2017). Narrated by Perun.
- "Oberon's Meaty Mysteries: The Purloined Poodle" (IDC #8.5) (Released September 2016) A story where Oberon solves a mystery with the help of Atticus.
- "Blood Pudding" (IDC #8.6), in the Besieged collection (2017). A Granuaile novellette.
- "Haunted Devils" (IDC #8.7), in the Besieged collection (2017). Narrated by Owen.
- "Oberon's Meaty Mysteries: The Squirrel on the Train" (IDC #8.8) (Released November 2017) A second story where Oberon solves a mystery with the help of Atticus.
- "The Naughtiest Cherub" (IDC #8.9), in First Dangle and Other Stories (2019). Narrated by Loki.
- "The End of Idylls" (IDC #8.9), in the Besieged collection (2017). "The events of this story, narrated by Atticus, take place immediately before the events of Scourged," (IDC #9).
- "Oberon's Meaty Mysteries: The Buzz Kill" (IDC #9.2) in the collection Death & Honey (2019). Oberon, Atticus, and Starbuck try to win a bet and solve a murder.
- "The Waters" (IDC #9.?), in First Dangle and Other Stories (2019). Narrated by Granuaile.
- "First Dangle" (IDC #9.?), in First Dangle and Other Stories (2019). An Owen and Slomo adventure.

== Reception ==
Literary reception for the series has been mostly positive with Publishers Weekly covering the first three books in the series.
