= Wells in the Irish Dindsenchas =

Fountainheads in Hibernian folk tales

The Dindsenchas of Irish mythology give the physical origins, and etymological source of several bodies of water – in these myth poems the sources of rivers and lakes is sometimes given as being from magical wells.

Connla's Well is one of a number of wells in the Irish "Celtic Otherworld". It is also termed "The Well of Wisdom", or "The Well of Knowledge", and is the mythical source of the River Shannon. The epithet Connla's Well is known from the Dindsenchas.

Another well is described in the dindsenchas about Boann, in the text as ("Secret Well") mythologically given as the origin of the River Boyne. This well has also been referred to as Nechtan's Well, or the Well of Segais.

Some writers conflate both Nechtan's and Connla's well, making it the source of both Shannon and Boyne.

Loch Garman's mythological origin is also given in the dindsenchas – in some translations or interpretations of the text the source of the water is given as the Well of Coelrind, though this has also been rendered as port of .., or even fountain of ...

== Connla's Well ==
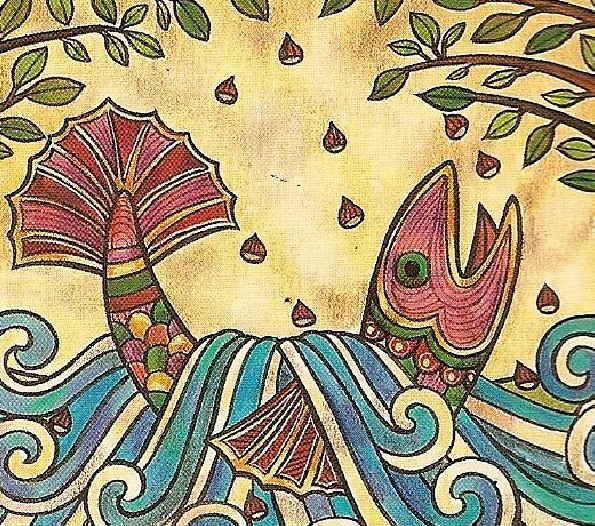
The Salmon of Knowledge in Connla's Well (Justin McCarthy, 1904)

In the Dindsenchas (Sinann I) refers to a "well with flow unfailing" as the source of the Sinann (Shannon). In (Sinann II) the well is referred to as Connla's well. In the poem the well is associated with the drowning of Sinend, daughter of Lodan Lucharglan, son of Ler, of the Tuatha Dé Danann – giving the river its name. Hazel trees, whose nuts fall into the water and feed salmon, are also mentioned in Sinann II.

Dindsenchas : Sinann II

Tipra Chonnlai, ba mór muirn,
bói fon aibeis eochar-guirm:
sé srotha, nárb inann blad,
eisti, Sinann in sechtmad.

Nói cuill Chrimaill, ind fhir glic,
dochuiret tall fon tiprait:
atát le doilbi smachta
fo cheó doirchi dráidechta.

Connla's well, loud was its sound,
was beneath the blue-skirted ocean:
six streams, unequal in fame,
rise from it, the seventh was Sinann.

The nine hazels of Crimall the sage
drop their fruits yonder under the well:
they stand by the power of magic spells
under a darksome mist of wizardry.

(Gwynn 1913, Sinann II, pp.292–293)

(Meyer & Nutt 1895) speculated that the name Connla's Well derived from some event (now lost) happening after Connla the Ruddy's journey to the land of the Aos Si.

(O'Curry 1883) states that there is a tradition that the seven streams flowing from the well formed the rivers including the River Boyne, River Suir, River Barrow, and River Slaney.

== Well of Segais ==
Another well is described in Dindsenchas refers to a topur diamair ("secret well") located in the Sid Nechtan. This poem tells of Boann wife of Nechtan, son of Labraid – the poem derives the origin of another river (River Boyne) from this magic well, and from the mutilation of Boann by the waters of the well.

Dindsenchas : Boand I

Nechtain mac Labrada laind,
diarbo ben Bóand, bágaimm,
topur diamair bói 'na dún,
assa maided cech mí-rún.

Ní fhail nodécced dia lár
nach maided a dá rosc rán:
dia ngluased do chlí nó deis,
ní thargad úad cen athis.

Nechtain son of bold Labraid
whose wife was Boand, I aver;
a secret well there was in his stead,
from which gushed forth every kind of mysterious evil.

There was none that would look to its bottom
but his two bright eyes would burst:
if he should move to left or right,
he would not come from it without blemish.

(Gwynn 1913, Boand I, pp.28–29)

This well is sometimes known as the Well of Segais (Segais means "forest"), from Boann's name in the otherwold, and the Boyne is also known as the Sruth Segsa. Other sources also refer to this well as Nechtan's Well.

In the Dictionary of Celtic Mythology (ed. James MacKillop) this well, as well as the Well of Connla are conflated, as Well of Segais, which is stated to be the source of both the River Shannon and River Boyne.

== Well of Coelrind ==
The term Well of Coelrind has been used with reference to the formation of Loch Garman as described in the dindsenchas.

In the tale Garman mac Bomma Licce (Garman, son of Bomma Licce) steals the queen's crown at Temair during the drinking during the feast of Samain. He is pursued to the mouth of the River Slaney where the waters burst forth drowning him – hence giving the name of Loch Garman. In (Gwynn 1913) there is no mention of a well, the place is rendered as port Cóelrenna ("port Coelrenna"). In (Stokes 1894) the place of drowning is translated as the "well of Port Coelrenna", and the water is said to have burst forth as Garman was being drowned. Elsewhere the place is translated "fountain [of] Caelrind".

== Legacy ==
Connla's Well is a common motif in Irish poetry, appearing, for example, in George William Russell's poem "The Nuts of Knowledge" or "Connla's Well":

And when the sun sets dimmed in eve, and purple fills the air,
I think the sacred hazel-tree is dropping berries there,
From starry fruitage, waved aloft where Connla's Well o'erflows;
For sure, the immortal waters run through every wind that blows.

Yeats described the well, which he encountered in a trance, as being full of the "waters of emotion and passion, in which all purified souls are entangled".

== See also ==
- Well of Wyrd
- Mímisbrunnr
