= Caer Ibormeith =

Irish mythological figure

In Irish mythology, Caer Ibormeith was the daughter of Prince Ethal Anbuail of Sid Uamuin in Connacht. In Óengus’s dream, which lasted over a year, Caer Ibormeith stood beside his bed. However, when he reached out for her, she would disappear. Every alternate Samhain she would turn to human form for one day, which begins at sunset, and after that, she would revert into being a swan, in which form she would remain for a year before becoming human again the following Samhain.

Óengus went in search for this girl in his dreams at the lake of the Dragon's Mouth and found 150 girls chained in pairs, his lady Caer Ibormeith, among them. Óengus was told he could marry Caer if he could identify her in her swan form. He chose correctly and with that Óengus turned himself into a swan and they flew away together, to the Brú na Bóinne/palace on the River Boyne near Slane, which was his long standing place of residence. The pair sang beautiful music as they went, that put all listeners throughout Ireland asleep for three days and nights. Caer would marry with Óengus of the Tuatha de Dannan, and, amongst other things, become foster-mother of Diarmuid.

In another version of the story, Caer is covered in 130 chains on her own rather than being chained to 149 other swans.

The story of Fionnuala and the other children of Lir shares the motif of transformation into swans, as swans and the associated cranes ("grús") share Irish mythological reverence due to, especially in the latter case, being equally at home in flight, on land, and in water, which made it an especially magical creature able to transition to other worlds. Moreover, as the tall Crane stands upright when on land, it was associated with shape-shifting, back into human form.

This tale inspired W.B. Yeats to write his poem The Song of the Wandering Aegnus.
