= Fráech =

Fráech (Fróech, Fraích, Fraoch) is a Connacht hero and demigod in the Ulster Cycle of Irish mythology. He is the nephew of Boann, goddess of the river Boyne, and son of Idath of the men of Connaught and Bébinn (sister of Boann of the sidhe), and is renowned for his handsomeness and exploits. He belongs to the Fir Domnann.

== Irish mythology ==
=== The Cattle-Raid of Fráech ===
In "The Cattle-Raid of Fráech" Fráech travels to the court of Ailill and Medb in pursuit of their daughter Findabair, after it becomes known that she is in love with him. Findabair falls in love with Fráech because of the great stories being told about him, Fráech's household convince him to visit his maternal aunt Boand to obtain wondrous gifts from her. Boand gives Fráech fifty intricately worked mantles and tunics with animal details, fifty jeweled spears that lit the night like the sun, fifty dark horses with gold bells, fifty swords with golden hilts, seven hounds in silver chains, seven trumpeters, three jesters, and three harpists. Fráech is warmly welcomed into Ailill and Medb's home, where he and his company are entertained feasted for a fortnight. After biding his time Fráech follows Findabair and her maid to the river while they are bathing one night, and Fráech explains his true purpose in coming to Cruachan - to elope with Findabair. Findabair says that she cannot elope, that being below her station, but she is happy Fráech has come to marry her and gives him a gold ring that her mother Medb gave her. Fráech goes to Ailill and Medb to ask for Findabair's hand in marriage, and they request in compensation an exorbitant bride-price consisting of sixty horses with gold bits, twelve white cattle with red ears with twelve calves, and Fráech's support in the Cattle raid of Cooley. Fráech refuses the dowry, saying he would not give it for Medb herself. Ailill and Medb fear that Fráech will elope with Findabair so they plot to murder him in such a way that they cannot be blamed. They tell Fráech that he has a reputation as a good swimmer and take him to a river where they will watch him bathe. When Fráech removes his clothes and enters the water, Ailill opens Fráech's purse and finds Findabair's ring; Ailill throws the ring into the water, and Fráech watches as a salmon leaps from the water to swallow it. Fráech catches the fish and brings it to shore, at which point Medb asks him to stay in the water and retrieve a branch of beautiful rowan berries on the other side of the river.). Fráech retrieves a branch of the rowan tree, so Medb asks for another branch, and when Fráech returns to the water he is attacked by a water monster (sometimes referred to as a dragon or serpent). Fráech begs for his sword from the company, but none of Ailill's men dare to help him, so Findabair strips off her clothes and dives into the water with Fráech's sword. Ailill attempts to spear his own daughter, but Fráech catches the spear and throws it back at Ailill. Findabair gives Fráech his sword and he beheads the water serpent but is badly wounded. Ailill and Medb take him back to their palace and prepare a bath for Fráech from bacon and the fresh meat of a heifer; they then place him in a bed to die, but a hundred and fifty maidens of the Sidhe, all dressed in green, hear the lamentations for Fráech and carry him off to the burial caverns of Cruachan. To the astonishment of all, the following morning Fráech returns to the court of Medb and Ailill without a single blemish, and the two companies make peace. In secret, Fráech immediately tells his servant to retrieve the salmon that he left on the shore the previous day, to cook it for Findabair and to remove the ring from its belly. The two parties then proceed to feast and become drunk, and Ailill demands that all of his jewels be displayed before the court. He asks Findabair what became of the ring he gave her and tells her that if it is not found, he will put her to death, but if she can produce it, she may choose her own husband. Findabair then sends her maid to retrieve the cooked fish with the ring prominently displayed on its top, and Ailill demands that Fráech explain how the ring was retrieved. Fráech tells Ailill that he found the ring when he first came to visit and heard at the water's edge that Findabair had lost the ring and was looking for it; Fráech then said he offered to return it to Findabair in exchange for her love for one year. Ailill and Medb then tell Fráech to retrieve his cattle and that when he returns to them, they shall give him Findabair in marriage.

Fráech then departs from Ailill and Medb and finds that his cattle have been stolen along with his wife and three sons while he was away. Fráech joins up with Conall Cernach and the two track the cattle and his family to the Alps; they are warned that the thieves' hideout is guarded by two dangerous serpents, but when they arrive, the serpents jump into Conall's girdle and the two heroes raid and destroy the dun, regaining Fráech's cattle and family. Fráech then returns to Medb and Ailill and agrees to fight for them against the Ulstermen in the Táin Bó Cuailnge (Cattle Raid of Cooley). Finally Fráech returns to Ailill and Medb to join them for the Táin Bó Cuailnge.

These two discontinuous parts of Fráech's story are contained in the narrative Táin Bó Fraích –The Raid of Fráech's Cattle. Although orally transmitted since antiquity, the earliest manuscript that contains the tale is the 12th-century Book of Leinster which has a complete version of the story. Besides subject matter, A.H. Leahy identifies stylistic and other differences between the two parts. The first part is set before the Táin Bó Cuailnge while the second part contains a reference to the Lombards ``who do not appear in Italy until the end of the sixth century". Leahy concludes there were two writers, one of whom ``embellished the love-story part of the original legend’’, while the other added ``geographical and historical knowledge of the time." Corroborative evidence comes from network science which identified quantifiable differences between the two parts of Fraích's story. The society depicted in the first part has many similar network properties to that of Táin Bó Cuailnge while the second part is different both to the first part and to Táin Bó Cuailnge.

=== The Death of Fráech ===
"The Death of Fráech" is a poem from The Book of the Dean of Lismore in which Fráech, who is described as the bravest, friendliest, and best of knights, is sent by Medb to retrieve the berries from a rowan tree on an island in Loch Medb. The berries from the rowan tree could cure disease and prolong life for a year, but the tree itself was guarded by a dragon or monster that dwelt in the loch among its roots. Fráech first went to the island and found the dragon asleep and was able to retrieve its berries unperceived. However Medb was not satisfied with the berries and requested that Fráech retrieve a branch from the tree. Fráech returned to the island and attempted to uproot the tree, but this act disturbed the dragon. The dragon bites Fráech in the side and tears off his arm, but Findabair provides a sword, which Fráech uses to behead the monster. Fráech finally comes ashore but dies of his wounds in Findabair's lap.

=== Táin Bó Cuailnge ===
In the Táin Bó Cuailnge, Medb sends for Fráech to fight against Cú Chulainn. Fráech finds Cú Chulainn bathing in a river and Cú Chulainn warns Fráech that if he enters the water, he will kill him. Fráech removes his clothes and enters the water to wrestle with Cú Chulainn. Cú Chulainn partially drowns Fráech and asks him to yield, but Fráech refuses, so Cú Chulainn submerges him a second time until he dies. Fráech's body is borne away to Sid Fraich by a troop of maidens of the Sidhe, all dressed in green.

== Placenames ==
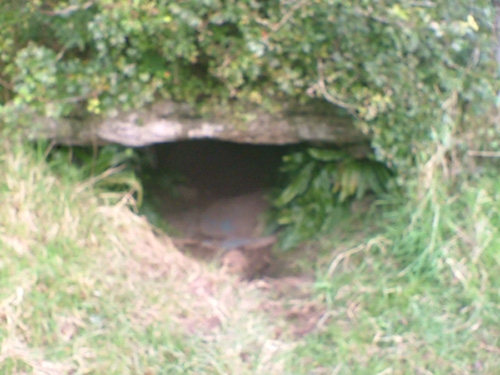
Entrance into the souterain Oweynagcat - the cave of Cruachan. The inside of the lintel stone has the ogham inscription

The mound of Carnfree (Irish Carn Fraoich, Fráech's Cairn) near Tulsk in County Roscommon, which was used for the inauguration of the O'Conor Kings of Connacht, preserves his name. The cave of Cruachan (Oweynagat meaning "cave of the cats") nearby contains an ogham inscription in primitive Irish reading VRACCI MAQI MEDVVI, (the cave) of Fráech son of Medb.

Fraoch is also the Celtic name of heather.
