= Boann =

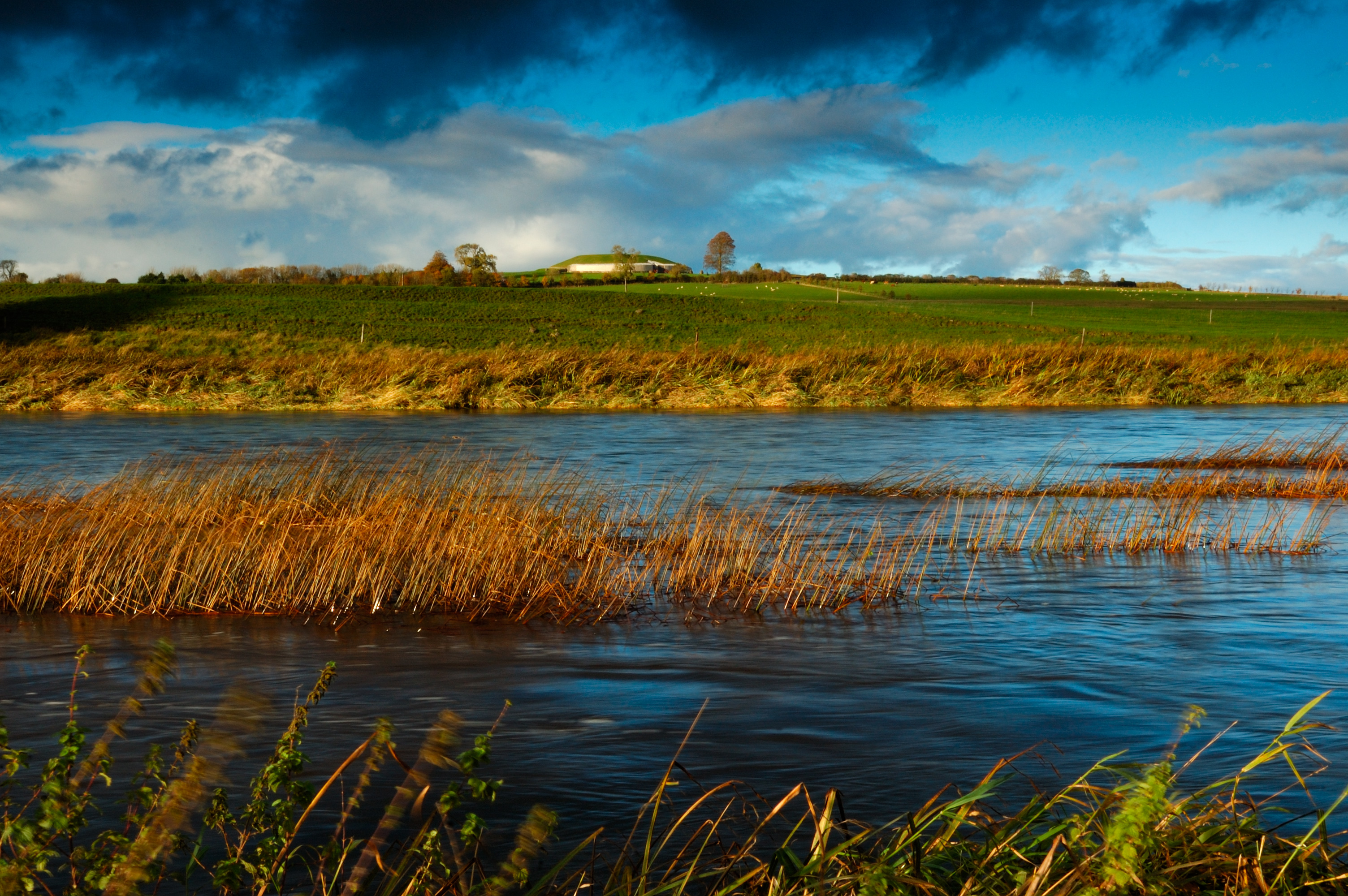
The River Boyne with Newgrange in the background.

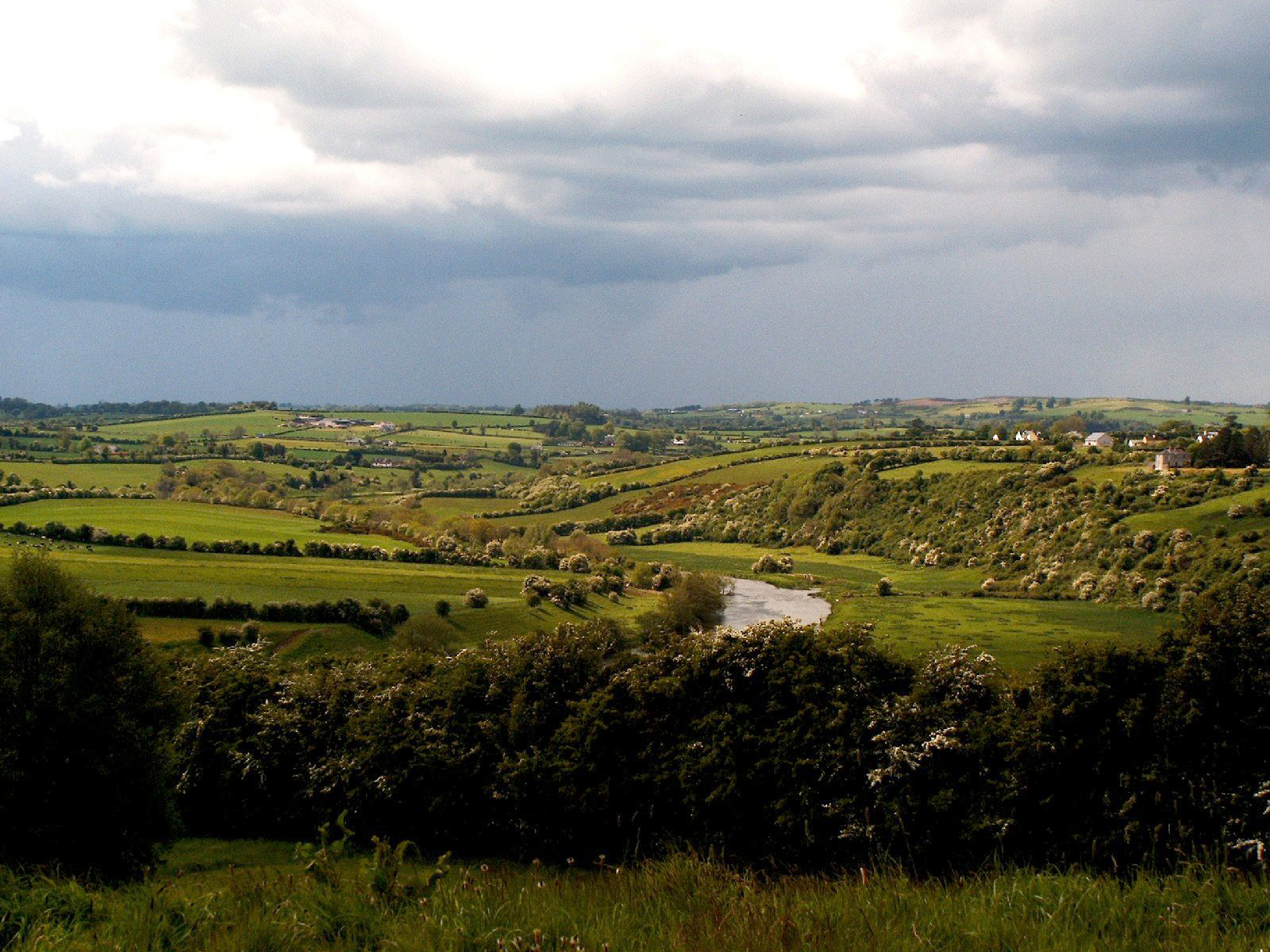
The River Boyne as seen from Brú na Bóinne.

Boann or Boand is the Irish goddess of the River Boyne (Bóinn), an important river in Ireland's historical province of Meath. According to the Lebor Gabála Érenn and Táin Bó Fraích she was the sister of Befind and daughter of Delbáeth, son of Elada, of the Tuatha Dé Danann. Her husband is variously Nechtan or Elcmar. With her lover the Dagda, she is the mother of Aengus.

== Etymology ==
Her name is interpreted as "white cow" (Irish: bó fhionn; Old Irish: bó find) in the dinsenchas, where she is also called "White Boand". Ptolemy's 2nd century Geography shows that in antiquity the river's name was Bouvinda [Βουουίνδα], which may derive from Proto-Celtic *Bou-vindā, "white cow". An alternate version of her name is given as Segais, hence Well of Segais. We are also told that Eithne was the wife of Elcmar and that another name for Eithne was Boand.

== Mythology ==
In the tale of Aengus's birth, Boann lives at Brú na Bóinne with her husband Elcmar. She has an affair with the Dagda, who impregnates her after sending Elcmar away on a one-day errand. To hide the pregnancy from Elcmar, the Dagda casts a spell on him, making "the sun stand still" so he will not notice the passing of time. Meanwhile, nine months pass and Boann gives birth to Aengus. The Dindsenchas explains the name Aengus as meaning "one desire", because the Dagda had been Boann's one true desire. It has been suggested that this tale represents the winter solstice illumination of Newgrange at Brú na Bóinne, during which the sunbeam (the Dagda) enters the inner chamber (the womb of Boann) when the sun's path stands still. The word solstice (Irish grianstad) means sun-standstill. The conception of Aengus may represent the 'rebirth' of the sun at the winter solstice.

As told in the Dindsenchas, Boann created the Boyne. Though forbidden to by her husband, Nechtan, Boann approached the magical Well of Segais (also known as the Connla's Well), which was surrounded, according to the legend, by nine magic hazel-trees. Hazelnuts were known to fall into the Well, where they were eaten by the speckled salmon (who, along with hazelnuts, also embody and represent wisdom in Irish mythology). Boann challenged the power of the well by walking around it tuathal; this caused the waters to surge up violently and rush down to the sea, creating the Boyne. In this catastrophe, she was swept along in the rushing waters, and lost an arm, leg and eye, and ultimately her life, in the flood. The poem equates her with famous rivers in other countries, including the River Severn, Tiber, Jordan River, Tigris and Euphrates. Additionally, it mentions alternate names for various parts of the Boyne, including River of Segais, the Arm and Leg of Nuada's wife, the Great Silver Yoke, White Marrow of Fedlimid, the River of the White Hazel, Banna, Roof of the Ocean, Lunnand, and Torrand.

In a variant of the same story as told in the Dindsenchas, Boand tried to hide her infidelity with the Dagda by washing herself in Nechtan's well, but when she approaches it, it overcomes her, and she drowns.

She had a lapdog, Dabilla, which was swept out to sea. Torn into pieces by the water, the two halves became the rocks known as Cnoc Dabilla, or Hill of Dabilla.

She also appears in Táin Bó Fraích as the maternal aunt and protector of the mortal Fráech. In that story, Fráech's people tell him to go visit his mother's sister Boand to receive the raiment of the Sídhe. Boand then gives Fráech fifty intricately worked mantles and tunics with animal details, fifty jeweled spears that lit the night like the sun, fifty dark horses with gold bells, fifty swords with golden hilts, seven hounds in silver chains, seven trumpeters, three jesters, and three harpists, which Fráech uses to dazzle Medb and Ailill.

=== Buan ===
According to the story "Cormac's Adventure in the Land of Promise", there is a well in Tír na nÓg surrounded by nine purple hazel trees. Called the Well of Knowledge, it yields five streams that Manannán mac Lir later explains are the five senses from which knowledge is apprehended. The hazels, which drop nuts into a pool of five salmon, are called the hazels of Buan. The combination of the well, hazels, salmon and the name Buan (meaning "enduring" or "persevering") likely points to a common origin with the story of Boand and the Well of Segais.

Another tale relates the fate of the only son of "White Buan," here identified as a male. Buan's son is named as Baile, loved by both men and women, who falls in love with Ailinn, daughter of Lugaid, son of Fergus of the Sea. The two lovers arrange a tryst, but before they can meet, Baile rests his chariot and releases his horses to graze. There he is intercepted by an unnamed character (likely Manannán in his trickster guise), described as a horrible apparition, approaching fitfully with the speed of a hawk or the wind from the green sea. When Baile asks the trickster from whence he comes and the reason for his haste, the trickster lies and tells Baile that he brings news of the death of Ailinn, who was killed by the warriors of Leinster and that she and her lover will only be reunited in death. With that news Baile drops dead on the spot, and a yew grows on his grave with the form of Baile's head at its top. The trickster moves on to intercept Ailinn, whom he tells of the death of Baile. With that news, Ailinn drops dead on the spot, and an apple tree grows on her grave with the form of her head at its top. The two trees are eventually cut down, turned into tablets, and inscribed with poems. On Halloween there was a poet's competition in Cormac's court, and the two tablets were brought together. When they met, they sprang together and intertwined as woodbine around a branch.

Another Buan, named the wife of the one-armed King Mesgegra of Leinster, dies of grief after Conall Cernach beheads her husband. A hazel tree then grows through her grave.

== In Neopaganism ==
Modern-day commentators and Modern Paganism sometimes identify Boann with the goddess Brigid or believe Boann to be Brigid's mother; however there are no Celtic sources that describe her as such. It is also speculated by some modern writers that, as the more well-known goddess, and later saint, the legends of numerous "minor" goddesses with similar associations may have over time been incorporated into the symbology, worship and tales of Brigid.

== See also ==
- Glas Gaibhnenn
