= Nechtan (mythology) =

Figure in Irish mythology

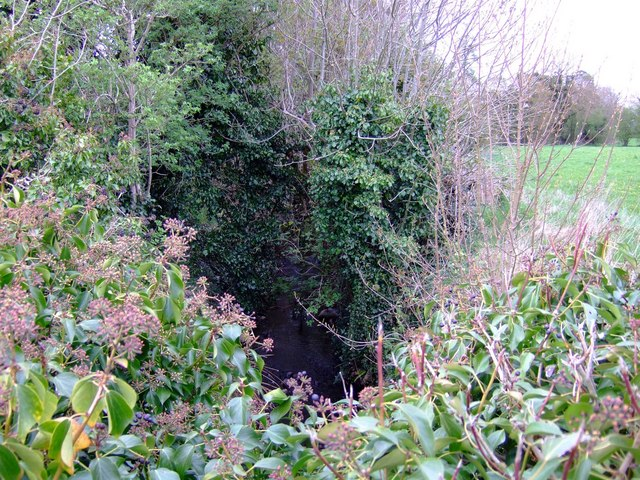
Nechtan is associated with the source of the River Boyne (pictured)

Nechtan is a figure in Irish mythology who is associated with a spring marking the source of the River Boyne, known as Nechtan's Well or the Well of Wisdom. He was the husband of Boann, eponymous goddess of the Boyne. Nechtan is believed to be another name for Nuada.

== Etymology ==
According to Georges Dumézil the name Nechtan is perhaps cognate with that of the Romano-British god Nodens or the Roman god called Neptunus and the Persian and Vedic gods sharing the name Apam Napat.

The name could ultimately be derived from the Proto-Indo-European root *nepot- "descendant, sister's son", or, alternatively, from nebh- "damp, wet". Another etymology suggests that Nechtan is derived from Old-Irish necht "clean, pure and white", with a root -neg "to wash", from IE neig^{u}̯- "to wash" As such, the name would be closely related mythological beings, who were dwelling near wells and springs: English neck (from Anglo-Saxon nicor), Swedish Näck, German Nixe and Dutch nikker, meaning "river monster, water spirit", hence Old-Norse nykr "water spirit in the form of a horse". Nechtan is often associated with horses. In Irish his name is used interchangeably with Elcmar -Lord of horses. Cognate imagery of Neptune riding foaming white horses rolling in from the sea and Norse spirits Nykr.

== Description ==
He inhabited the otherworldly Síd Nechtain, the mythological form of Carbury Hill. In the Dindsenchas Nechtan is described as the husband of Boann and the son of Nuadu. Elsewhere in the Dindsenchas Nechtan is said to be the son of Labraid or called "mac Namat". Similarly in the Book of Invasions Nechtan is named along with his brother Caicher as the sons of Nama, sons of Eochu Garb, but Caicher is elsewhere in the same text named as the son of Nuada.

Only Nechtan and his three cup-bearers named Flesc, Lam, and Luam were permitted to visit the Tobar Segais or "Well of Wisdom" into which nine sacred hazel trees dropped their wisdom-bearing nuts. In that well swam the Salmon of Wisdom, which ate the hazelnuts. Eating one of the salmon could in turn imbue a person with knowledge of all things.

In the Book of Invasions Nechtan killed Cairpre and was in turn killed by Sigmall, the grandson of Midir.

== Legacy ==
Nechtan or Nectan became a common Celtic name and a number of historical or legendary figures bear it. Nechtan was a frequent name for Pictish kings. Nectan of Hartland, said to have lived in the 5th century AD, is the patron saint of Hartland, Devon. Some however argue that St. Nectan never existed as a historical person, but was instead a Christianized form of the god Nechtan.

St Nectan's Kieve in St Nectan's Glen near Tintagel, Cornwall is said to be named for St. Nectan - though this is a Victorian invention. The place was called Nathan's Cave in 1799. and was named after a local landowner.

The name MacNaughton derives from "MacNeachdainn", meaning "Son of Nechtan."

== See also ==
- Mímir
