= Apples in mythology =

Symbol in various mythologies and religions

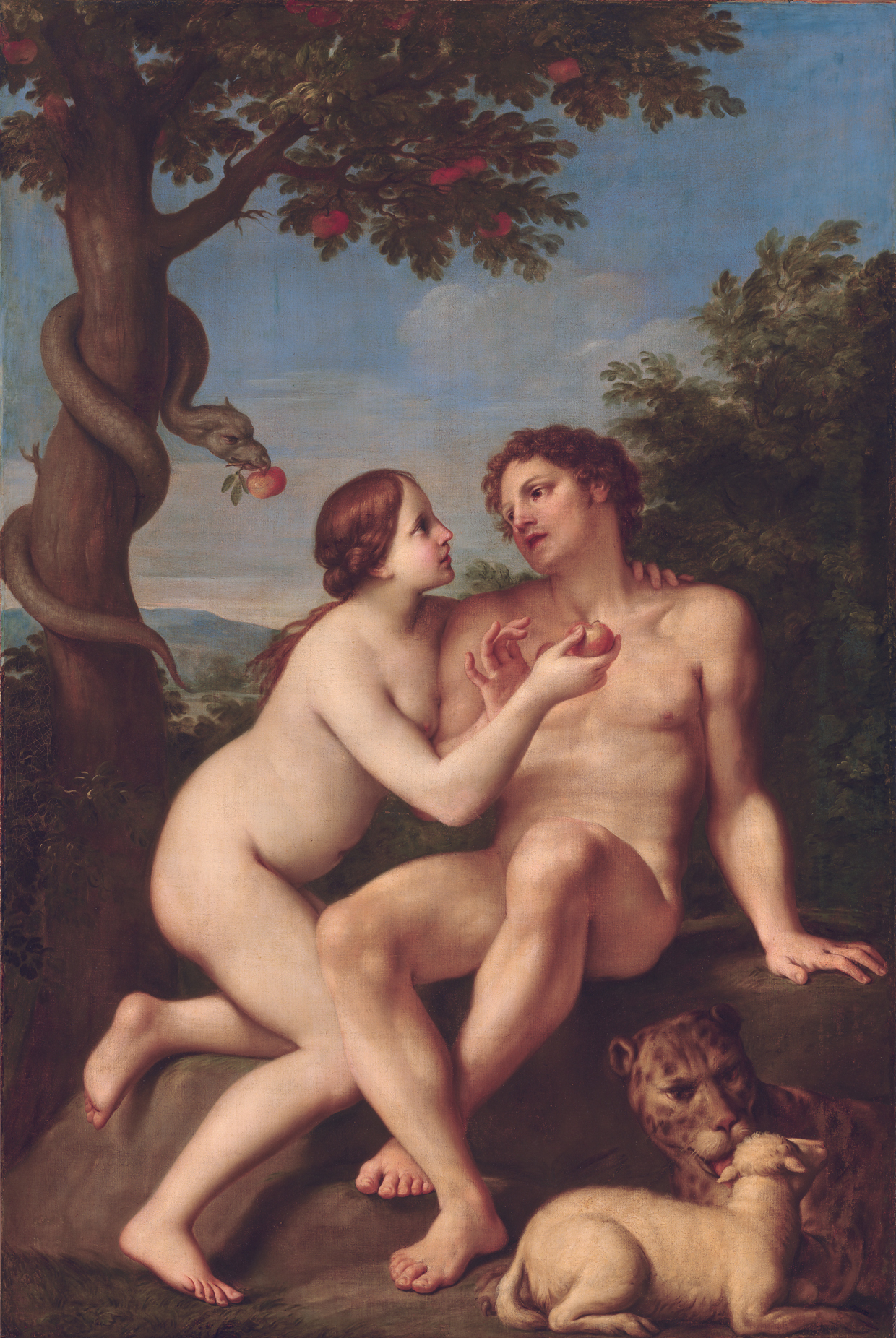
Adam and Eve, Marcantonio Franceschini. The forbidden fruit is often depicted as an apple.

Apples appear in many religious traditions, often as a mystical or forbidden fruit. One of the problems identifying apples in religion, mythology and folktales is that as late as the 17th century, the word "apple" was used as a generic term for all (foreign) fruit other than berries, but including nuts. This term may have extended to plant galls such as oak apples, as they were thought to be of plant origin. When tomatoes were introduced into Europe, they were called "love apples". In one Old English work, cucumbers are called eorþæppla (lit. "earth-apples"), just as in French, Dutch, Greek, Hebrew, Afrikaans, Persian and Swiss German as well as several other German dialects, the words for potatoes mean "earth-apples". In some languages, oranges are called "golden apples" or "Chinese apples". Datura is called "thorn-apple".

At times artists co-opted the apple, whether for ironic effect or as a stock element of symbolic vocabulary. Thus, secular art as well made use of the apple as symbol of love and sexuality. It is often an attribute associated with Venus who is shown holding it.

== Mythology and religion ==
=== Christianity ===
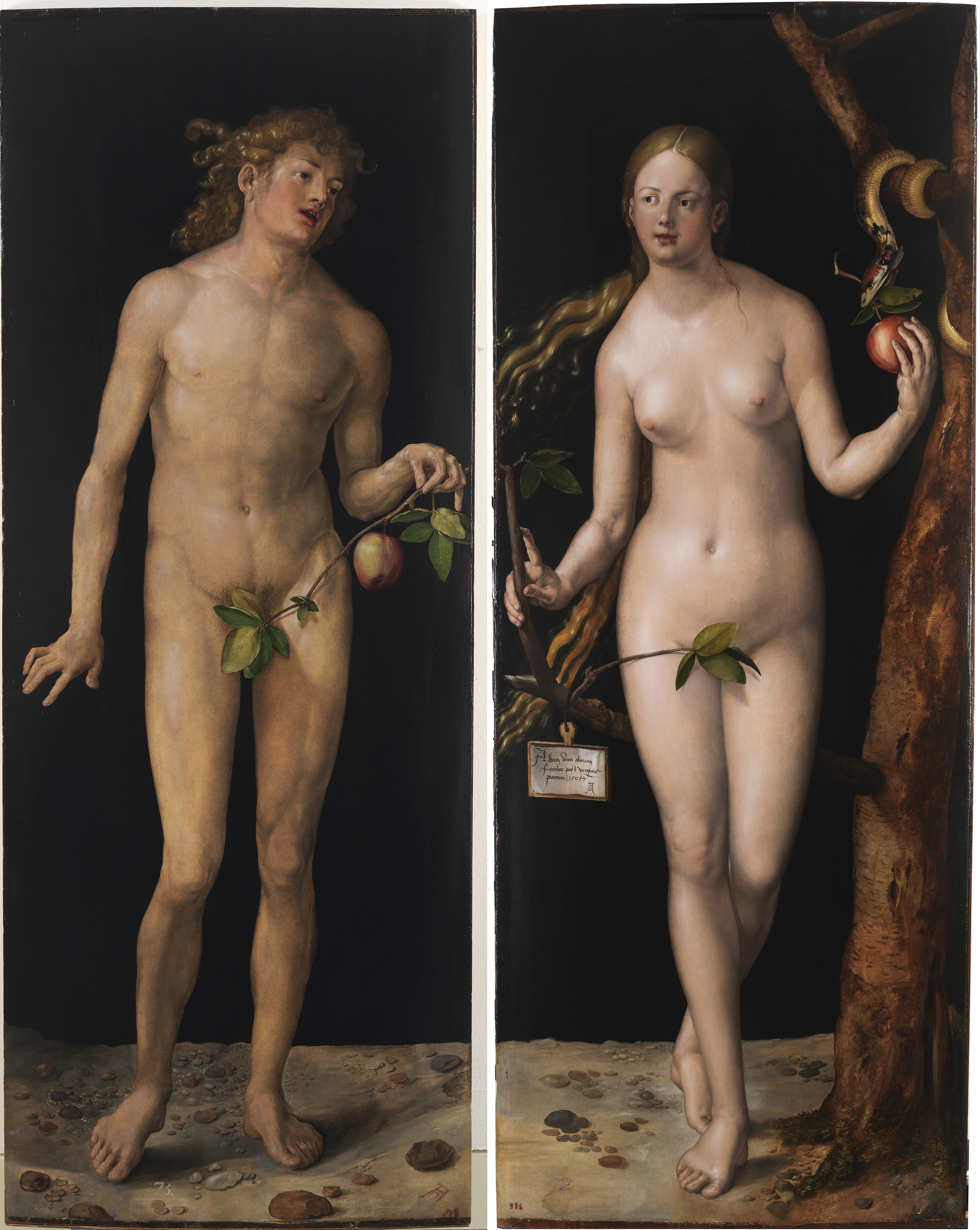
Adam and Eve: a classic depiction of the biblical tale showcasing the apple as a symbol of sin. Albrecht Dürer, 1507; oil on panel.

Though the forbidden fruit in the Book of Genesis is not identified, popular Western Christian tradition holds that Adam and Eve ate an apple from the forbidden tree in the Garden of Eden. The unnamed fruit of Eden thus became an apple under the influence of the story of the golden apples in the Garden of Hesperides. As a result, the apple became a symbol for knowledge, immortality, temptation, the fall of man and sin. There is nothing in the Bible to show the forbidden fruit of the tree of knowledge was necessarily an apple.

The larynx in the human throat has been called Adam's apple because of the folk tale, recorded in the 17th century, that the bulge was caused by the forbidden fruit sticking in the throat of Adam.

=== Greek ===
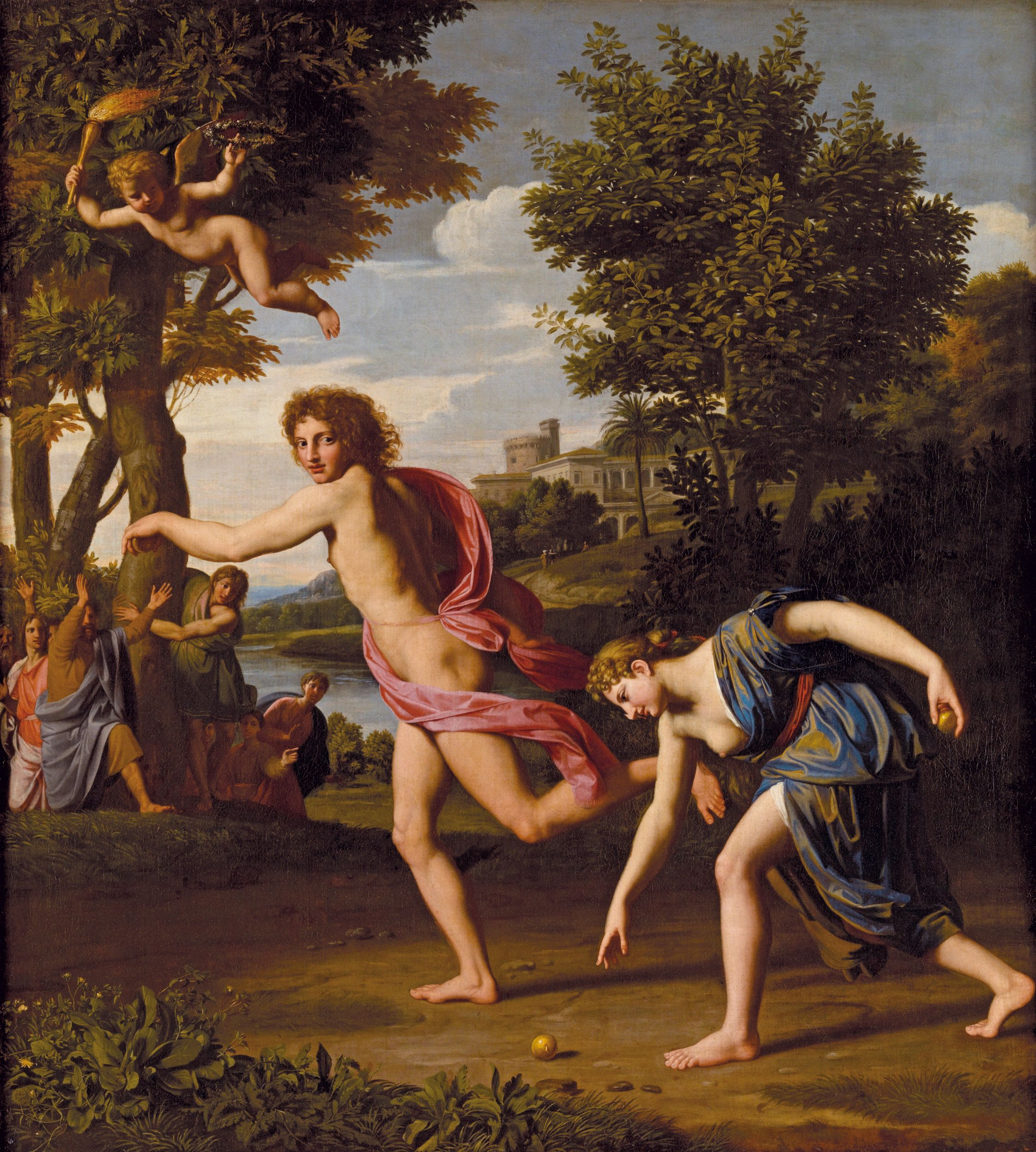
Atalanta and Hippomenes by Nicolas Colombel

The Garden of the Hesperides is Hera's orchard in the west, where either a single apple plant or a grove grows, producing golden apples. According to legend, when the marriage of Zeus and Hera took place, the different deities came with nuptial presents for the latter, and among them Gaia, with branches bearing golden apples upon them as a wedding gift. The Hesperides were given the task of tending to the grove, but occasionally picked apples from it themselves. Not trusting them, Hera also placed in the garden an immortal, never-sleeping, hundred-headed dragon named Ladon as an additional safeguard.

In the myth of the Judgement of Paris, it was from the Garden that Eris, the goddess of discord, obtained the Apple of Discord. Eris became disgruntled after she was excluded from the wedding of Peleus and Thetis. In retaliation, she tossed a golden apple inscribed Kallistēi ('For the most beautiful one'), into the wedding party. Three goddesses claimed the apple: Hera, Athena, and Aphrodite. Paris of Troy was appointed to select the recipient. After being bribed by both Hera and Athena, Aphrodite tempted him with the most beautiful woman in the world, Helen of Sparta. He awarded the apple to Aphrodite, thus indirectly causing the Trojan War.

The Greek hero Heracles, as a part of his Twelve Labours, was required to travel to the Garden of the Hesperides and pick the golden apples off the Tree of Life growing at its center.

Atalanta, also of Greek mythology, raced all her suitors in an attempt to avoid marriage. She outran all but Hippomenes (a.k.a. Melanion, a name possibly derived from melon the Greek word for both "apple" and fruit in general), who defeated her by cunning, not speed. Hippomenes knew that he could not win in a fair race, so he used three golden apples (gifts of Aphrodite, the goddess of love) to distract Atalanta. It took all three apples and all of his speed, but Hippomenes was finally successful, winning the race and Atalanta's hand.

=== Norse ===
In Norse mythology, Iðunn, the goddess of eternal youth, is the keeper of an eski (a wooden box made of ash wood and often used for carrying personal possessions) full of apples eaten by the gods when they begin to grow old, rendering them young again. This is described as recurring until Ragnarök. Gangleri (described as King Gylfi in disguise) states that it seems to him that the gods depend greatly upon Iðunn's good faith and care. Iðunn was once abducted by Þjazi the giant, who used Loki to lure Iðunn and her apples out of Ásgarðr. After borrowing Freyja's falcon skin, Loki liberated Iðunn from Þjazi by transforming her into a nut for the flight back. Þjazi gave chase in the form of an eagle, whereupon reaching Ásgarðr he was set aflame by a bonfire lit by the Æsir.

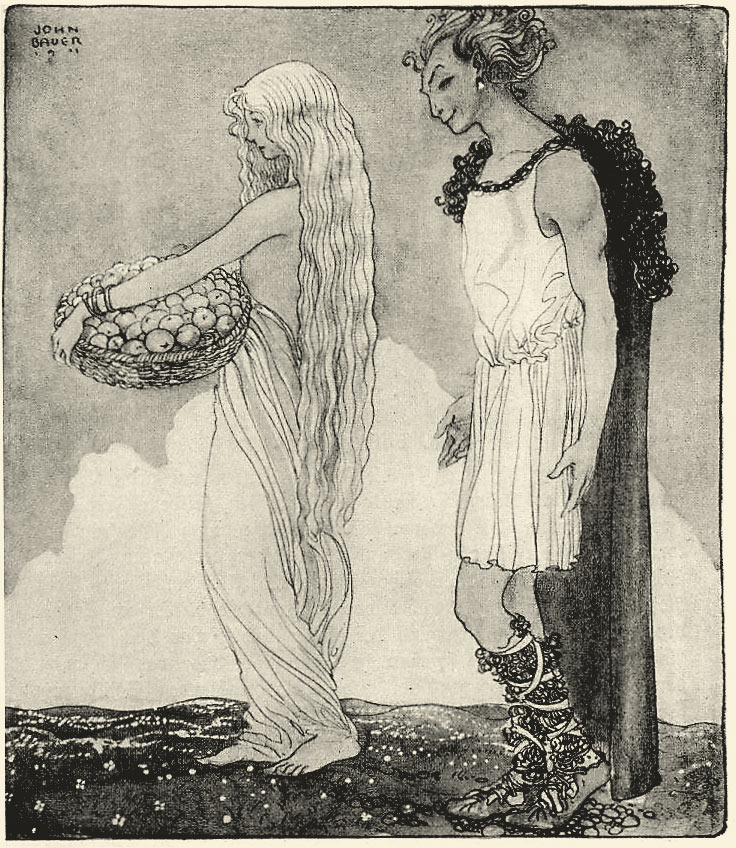
Loki and Idun (1911) by John Bauer

English scholar Hilda Ellis Davidson notes a connection between apples and the Vanir, a group of gods associated with fertility in Norse mythology, citing an instance of eleven "golden apples" being given to woo the beautiful Gerðr by Skírnir, who was acting as messenger for the major Vanir god Freyr in stanzas 19 and 20 of the poem Skírnismál. Davidson also notes a further connection between fertility and apples in Norse mythology; in chapter 2 of the Völsunga saga when the major goddess Frigg sends King Rerir an apple after he prays to Odin for a child, Frigg's messenger (in the guise of a crow) drops the apple in his lap as he sits atop a mound.

The Norse kenning apples of Hel (epli Heljar) occurs in a piece by the skald Þórbjörn Brúnason embedded in the Heiðarvíga saga. The phrase appears to refer to death itself as a subversion of Iðunn's apples. The skald says that his wife desires his death, and that she wants him to live under the earth and to give apples of Hel to him. Davidson believes this may specifically imply that the apple was thought of by the skald as the food of the dead.

=== Celtic ===
The fruit and tree of the apple is celebrated in numerous functions in Celtic mythology, legend, and folklore; it is an emblem of fruitfulness and sometimes a means to immortality. Wands of druids were made from wood either of the yew or of the apple.

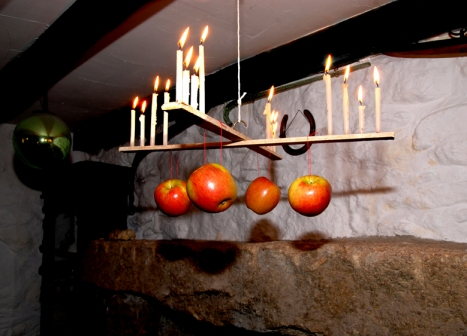
The Allantide game

Allantide (Cornish: Kalan Gwav, meaning first day of winter) is a Cornish festival that was traditionally celebrated on the night of 31 October, as well as the following day time. One of the most important parts of this festival was the giving of Allan apples, large glossy red apples that were highly polished, to family and friends as tokens of good luck. Allan apple markets used to be held throughout West Cornwall in the run up to the feast. and in the town of St Just it surpassed Christmas as a time for giving gifts until the late 20th century. A game was also recorded in which two pieces of wood were nailed together in the shape of a cross. It was then suspended, with 4 lit candles on each arm and Allan apples suspended underneath. The aim being to catch the apples with your mouth without getting molten wax on your face. For unmarried recipients the apples would be placed under their pillows in the hope that they would bring dreams of their future wife or husband.

The acquisition of the Silver Branch in The Voyage of Bran, a silver apple branch with white blossoms, is the incident which sends the eponymous hero Bran mac Febail on a journey to the Otherworld.

A magical silver branch with three golden apples belonged to the sea deity Manannán mac Lir and was given to the high king Cormac mac Airt in the narrative of the Echtra Cormaic. The branch created magical soporific music that assuaged those afflicted with injury or illness to sleep. In the Irish tale Echtra Condla, Conle the son of Conn is fed an apple by a fairy lover, which sustains him in terms of food and drink for a month without diminishing; but it also makes him long for the woman and the beautiful country of women to which his lover is enticing him.

In the Arthurian mythos, the island of Avalon is considered the Isle of Apples, and its very name, originally Welsh, refers to the fruit. Geoffrey of Monmouth's Vita Merlini describes the enchanted isle as being populated by many apple trees. Avalon from its first inception was considered the home of the magical Morgan le Fay, her sisters, and their mystical practices.

After being killed by brigands, the Breton pseudo-saint Konorin was transformed into a mysterious apple which, when eaten by a young virgin, causes her impregnation and his rebirth as the "son of the apple, the fruit of wisdom".

== Legends, folklore, and traditions ==
In North America a Native American is called an "apple" (a slur that stands for someone who is "red on the outside, white on the inside.") primarily by other Native Americans to indicate someone who has lost touch with their cultural identity. First used in the 1980s. During the Jewish New Year, Rosh Hashanah, it is customary to eat apples dipped in honey to evoke a "sweet new year". In the United States, teachers used to commonly receive gifts of apples, as the community was expected to both provide housing and food for them, because teachers were often unmarried women. The symbol of an apple is still strongly associated with teachers to this day, with apples being a popular theme for gifts and awards given to exemplary teachers. In North Caucasian mythology, the Narts possessed a tree which grew apples that would guarantee a child to the person who consumed them, based on which side of the apple was eaten.

Ethnobotanical and ethnomycological scholars such as R. Gordon Wasson, Carl Ruck and Clark Heinrich have theorized that the mythological apple is a symbolic substitution for the entheogenic fly agaric mushroom. Its association with knowledge is an allusion to the revelatory states described by some shamans and users of psychedelic mushrooms, though this is not a widely accepted idea.

== Gallery ==
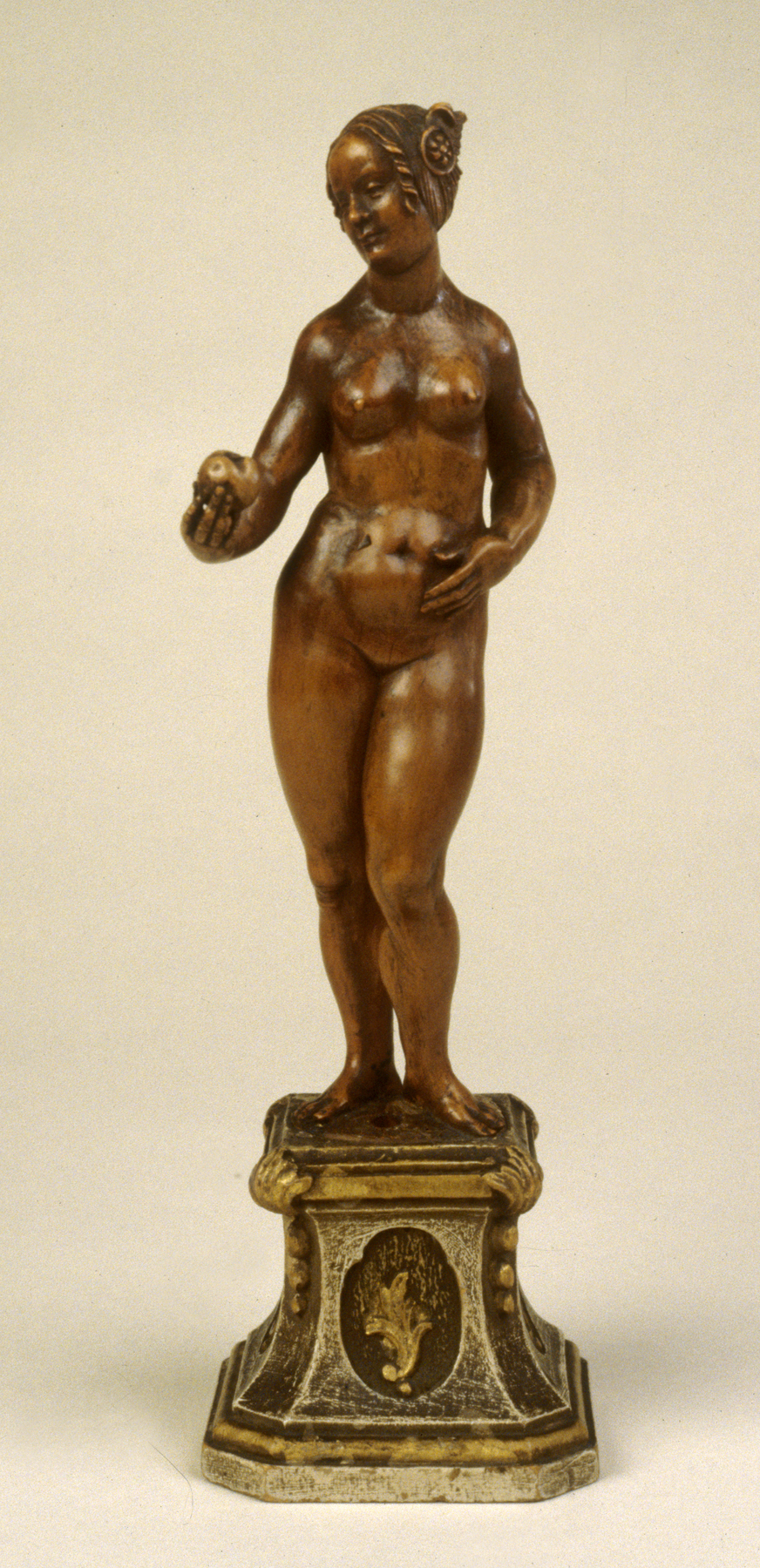
Venus Holding an Apple, Daniel Mauch, 1530s

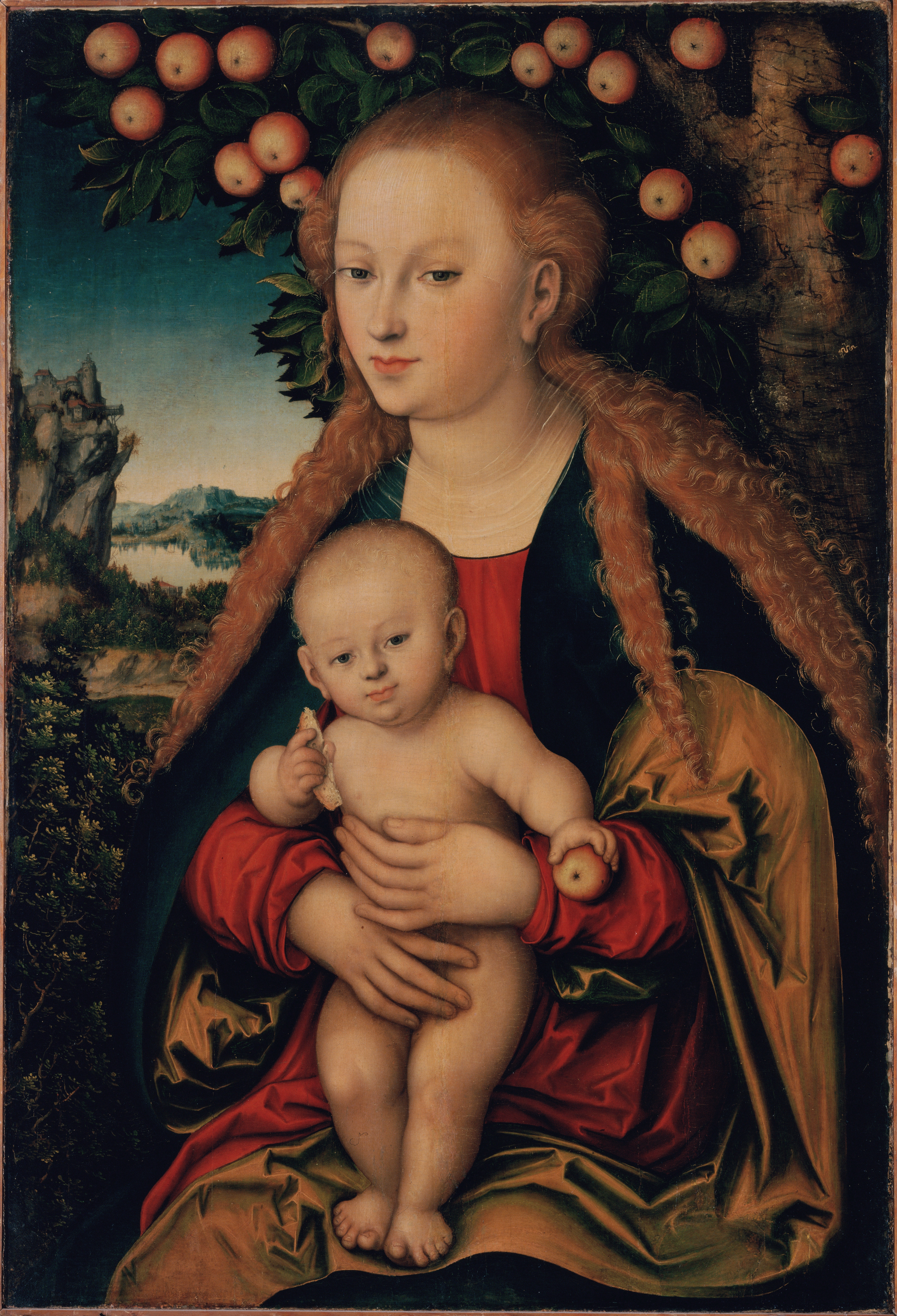
The Virgin and Child Under an Apple Tree, Lucas Cranach the elder, 1530s

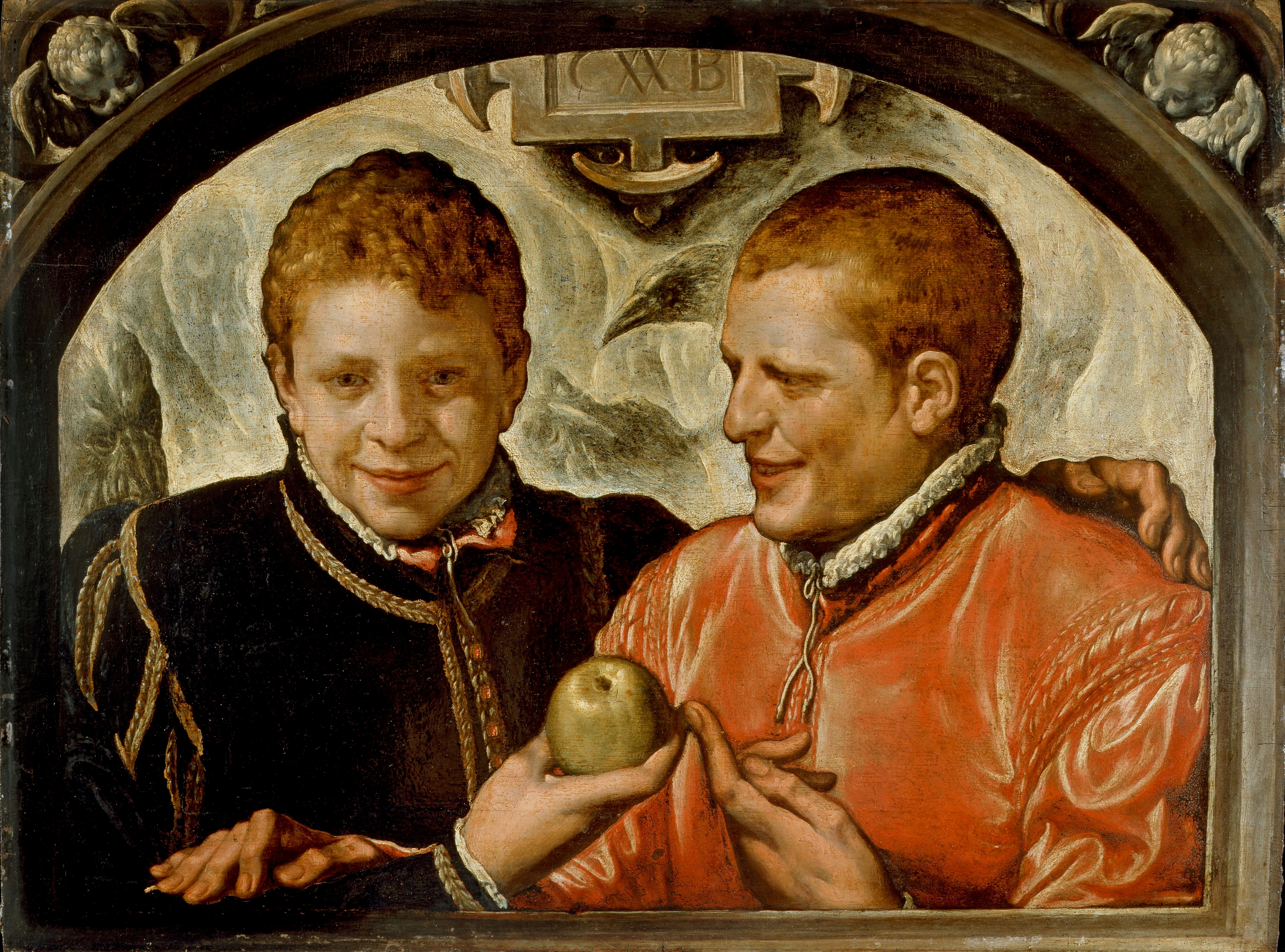
Two Young Men,
Crispin van den Broeck (Dutch), c. 1590; Oil on panel; Fitzwilliam Museum, Cambridge

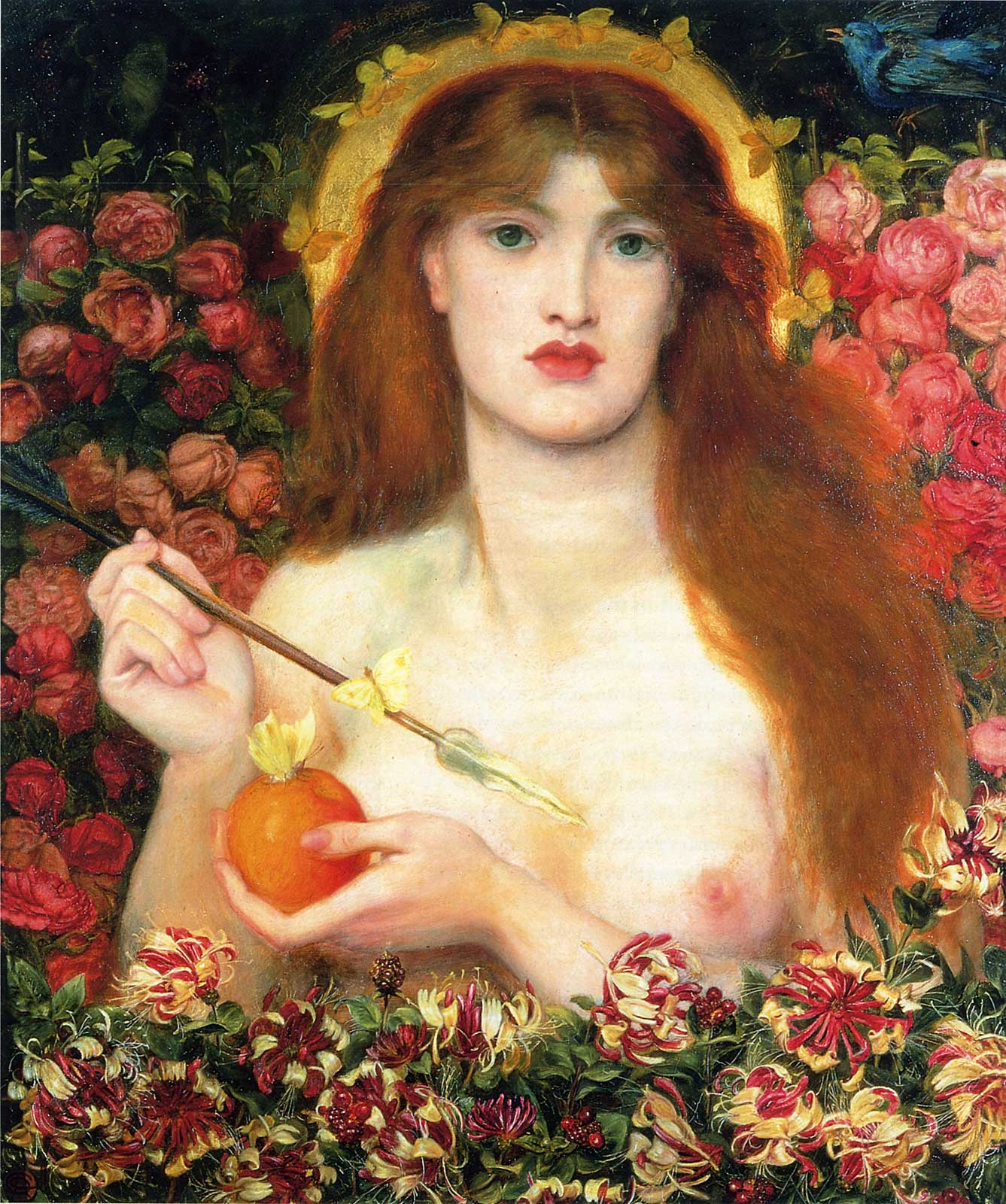
Venus Verticordia, Dante Gabriel Rossetti, c. 1866

== See also ==
- Apple Tree Man
- Shooting an apple off one's child's head
- The symbol in Psychoanalysis and archetypes
