= Golden apple =

Element in various national and ethnic folk legends or fairy tales

The golden apple is an element that appears in various legends that depict a hero (for example Hercules or Făt-Frumos) retrieving the golden apples hidden or stolen by an antagonist. Gold apples also appear on the Silver Branch of the Otherworld in Irish mythology.

== Greek mythology ==
Golden apples appear in three Greek myths:

=== Atalanta and Melanion ===
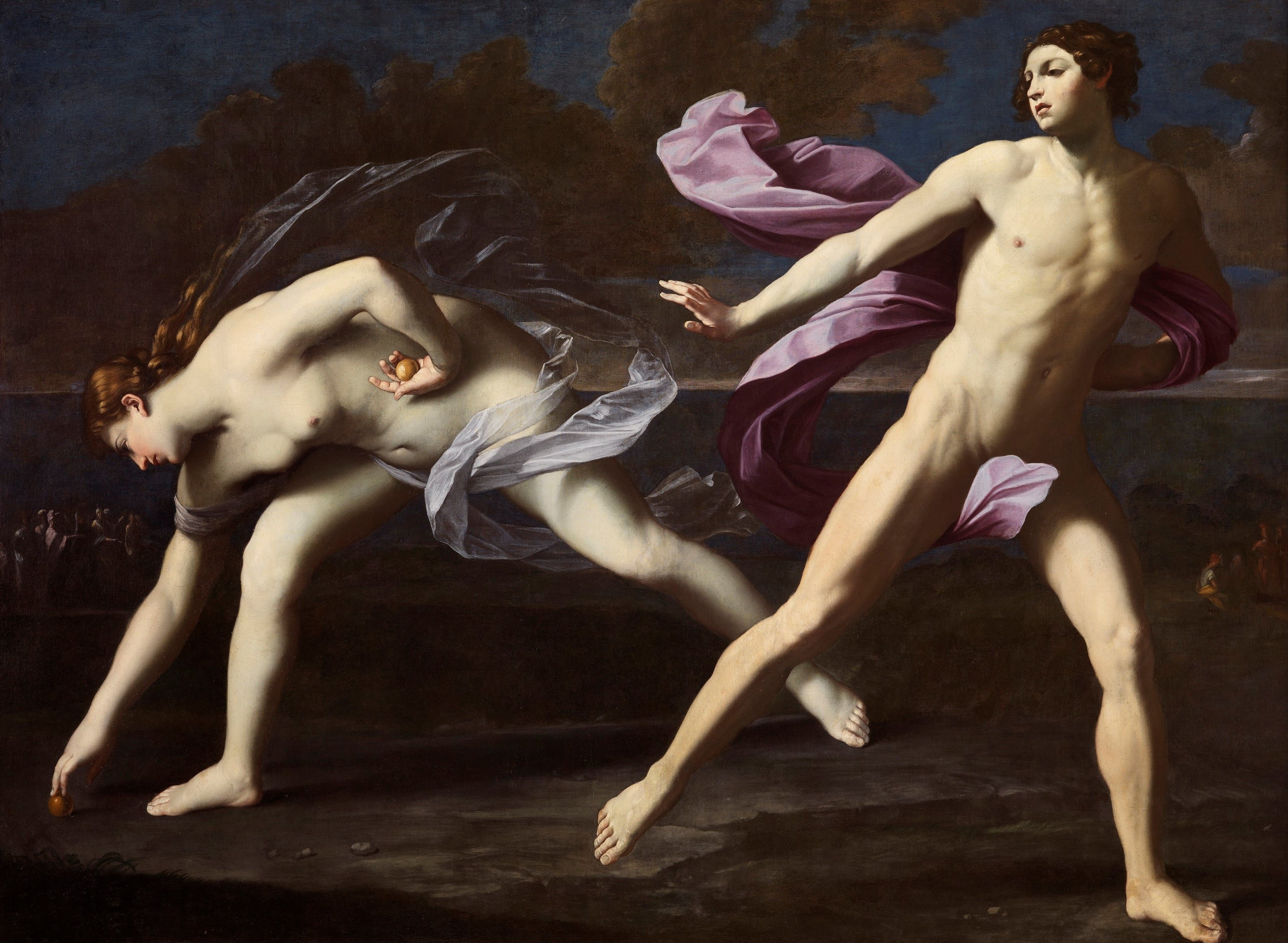
Atalanta and Melanion, Guido Reni, c. 1622–25

A huntress named Atalanta who raced against a suitor named Melanion, also known as Hippomenes. Melanion used golden apples to distract Atalanta so that he could win the race.

Though abandoned by her father as an infant, Atalanta became a skilled hunter and received acclaim for her role in the hunt for the Calydonian boar. Her father claimed her as his daughter and wished to marry her off. However, Atalanta was reluctant to marry due to a prophecy that marriage would be her downfall. Because of her beauty, she gained a number of suitors and finally agreed to marry, but under the condition that her suitor was obligated to beat her in a footrace. Competitors who failed to beat her would be put to death. As Atalanta could run extremely fast, all her suitors died.

Realizing that Atalanta could not be defeated in a fair race, Melanion prayed to Aphrodite for help. The goddess gave him three golden apples and told him to drop them one at a time to distract Atalanta. Sure enough, she quit running long enough to retrieve each golden apple. It took all three apples and all of his speed, but Melanion finally succeeded, winning the race and Atalanta's hand.

Eventually they had a son Parthenopeus, who was one of the Seven against Thebes. Their marriage ended in misfortune when they were transformed into lions (which the Greeks believed were unable to mate with their own species, only with leopards) for offending Zeus by having an affair in one of his shrines.

=== Paris and the Trojan War ===
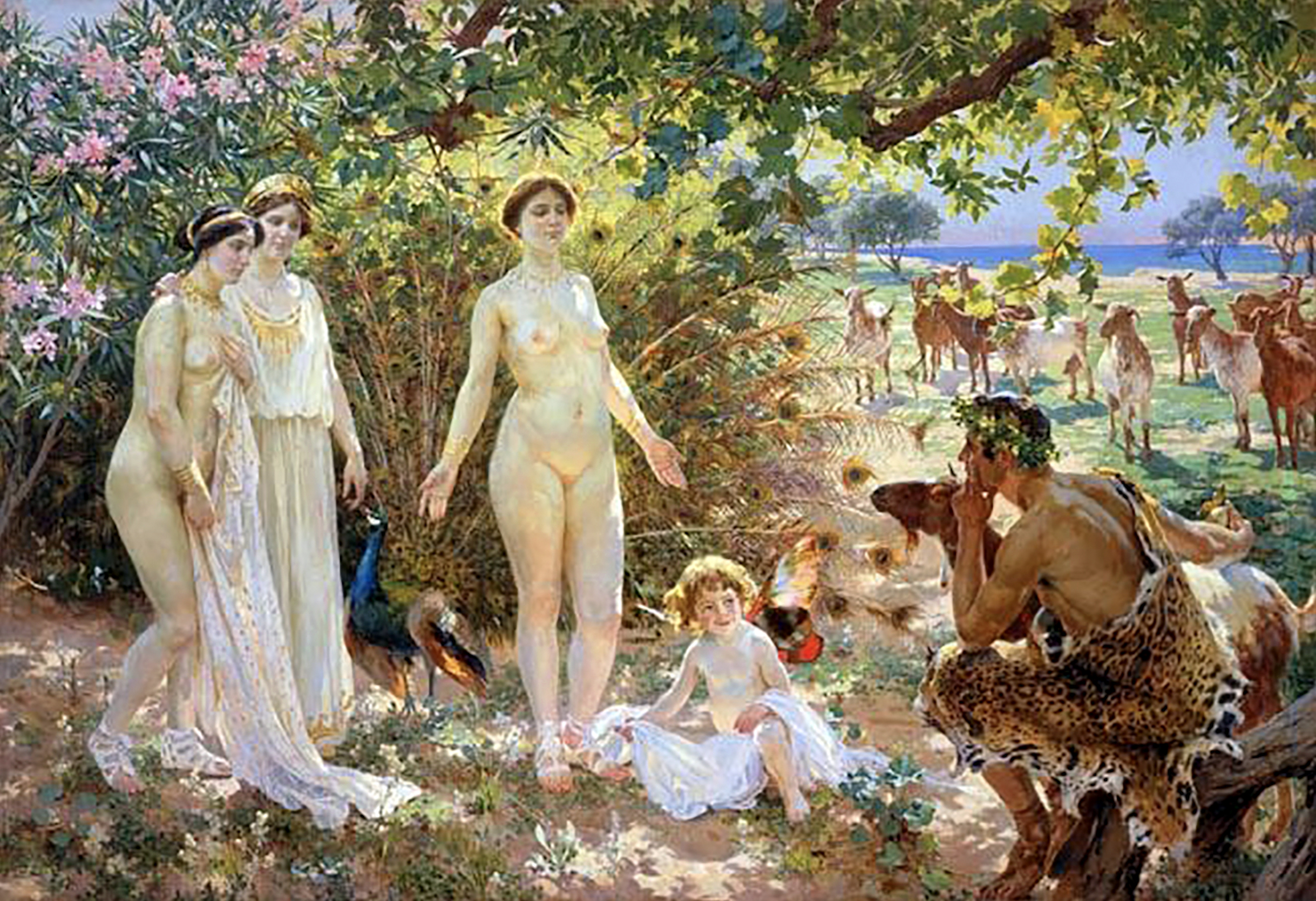
El Juicio de Paris by Enrique Simonet, 1904. Paris is holding the golden apple on his right hand while surveying the goddesses in a calculative manner.

Zeus held a banquet in celebration of the marriage of Peleus and Thetis. Eris, the goddess of discord, was not invited due to her troublesome nature, and upon turning up uninvited, she threw a golden apple into the ceremony, with an inscription that read: "ΤΗΙ ΚΑΛΛΙΣΤΗΙ" (Ancient Greek: τῇ καλλίστῃ, romanized: tē(i) kallistē(i), Modern Greek: τη καλλίστη ti kallisti; "for/to the most beautiful" – cf. Callisto).

Three goddesses claimed the apple: Hera, Athena, and Aphrodite. They brought the matter before Zeus. Not wanting to get involved, Zeus assigned the task to Paris of Troy. Paris had demonstrated his exemplary fairness previously when he awarded a prize unhesitatingly to Ares after the god, in bull form, had bested his own prize bull. Zeus gave the apple to Hermes and told him to deliver it to Paris and tell him that the goddesses would accept his decision without argument. As each goddess wanted to receive the apple, they each stripped off their own clothing and appeared naked before Paris.

Each of the goddesses also offered Paris a gift as a bribe in return for the apple. Hera offered to make him the king of Europe and Asia Minor, Athena offered him wisdom and skill in battle, and Aphrodite offered to give to him the love of the world's most beautiful woman, Helen of Sparta, who was already married to King Menelaus. Paris chose Aphrodite, a decision that caused the Trojan War, and ultimately the destruction of both Paris and his city, Troy.

=== Hera and the Hesperides ===
Hera's sacred tree, given to her as gift from Zeus, grows apples made entirely of gold. The dragon Ladon was sent to guard it from anyone who might try to steal the apples.

== Irish mythology ==
The role of the Golden Apple is far more minor and less specific in Irish lore, mostly because it is an element of the Silver Branch, or Silver Bough, symbol that is connected to the Celtic Otherworld.

=== Apple branch ===
The silver branch with golden apples is owned by the Irish sea deity and Otherworld guardian Manannán mac Lir in the tale Echtra Cormaic. (Note: This tale exists in several manuscripts of the fourteenth and fifteenth centuries; i. e. Book of Ballymote, and Yellow Book of Lecan, as edited and translated by Stokes, in Irische Texts, III. i. 183–229; cf. Voy. of Bran, i. 190 ff.; cf. Le Cycle Myth. Irl., pp. 326–33.) But these "apples" are actually "balls of red gold" hanging on a musical branch according to variant texts, (Note: Book of Fermoy version.) and hardly fruits at all. (Note: The "apples" are also of "red gold" in Standish H. O'Grady's version, also reprinted in condensed form by Jacobs, and in the retelling by Lady Gregory.) The Dictionary of the Irish Language concurs, by defining the "apples" in this instance as "musical balls", not "fruits".

There has been offered for comparison "silver branch of the sacred apple-tree bearing blossoms" encountered by Bran mac Febail in the narrative The Voyage of Bran, though golden apple fruits are not evident in this telling. This branch came from "Emain", construed to mean Emain Ablach associated with Manannán mac Lir by later commentators, though not recognized as anything other than Emain Macha of the Ulstermen in Eleanor Hull's monograph on the silver branch.

=== Oidheadh Chloinne Tuireann ===
In the Oidheadh Chloinne Tuireann version of the quest of Tuirenn's sons (Brian, Iuchar and Iucharba), the éric items demanded by Lugh Lamhfada included the Golden Apples of Hesperides. It is said to taste of honey, have curative powers, and not diminish though they are eaten. They could also be cast and perform tasks at will, and return to their owners.

== Music ==
In Richard Wagner's Der Ring des Nibelungen, the golden apples have their own leitmotif. It is first sung by Fafner, when he explains to his brother Fasolt why they must take Freia away from the gods.

In Stravinsky's ballet The Firebird (1910) which is based upon an amalgam of Russian folk-legends, the hero Prince Ivan enters a garden where he witnesses 13 young princesses playing with golden apples which grow there. (Tableaux VII Scherzo. Jeux des princesses avec les pommes d'or / The Princesses' Game with the Golden Apples).

== Fairy tales ==
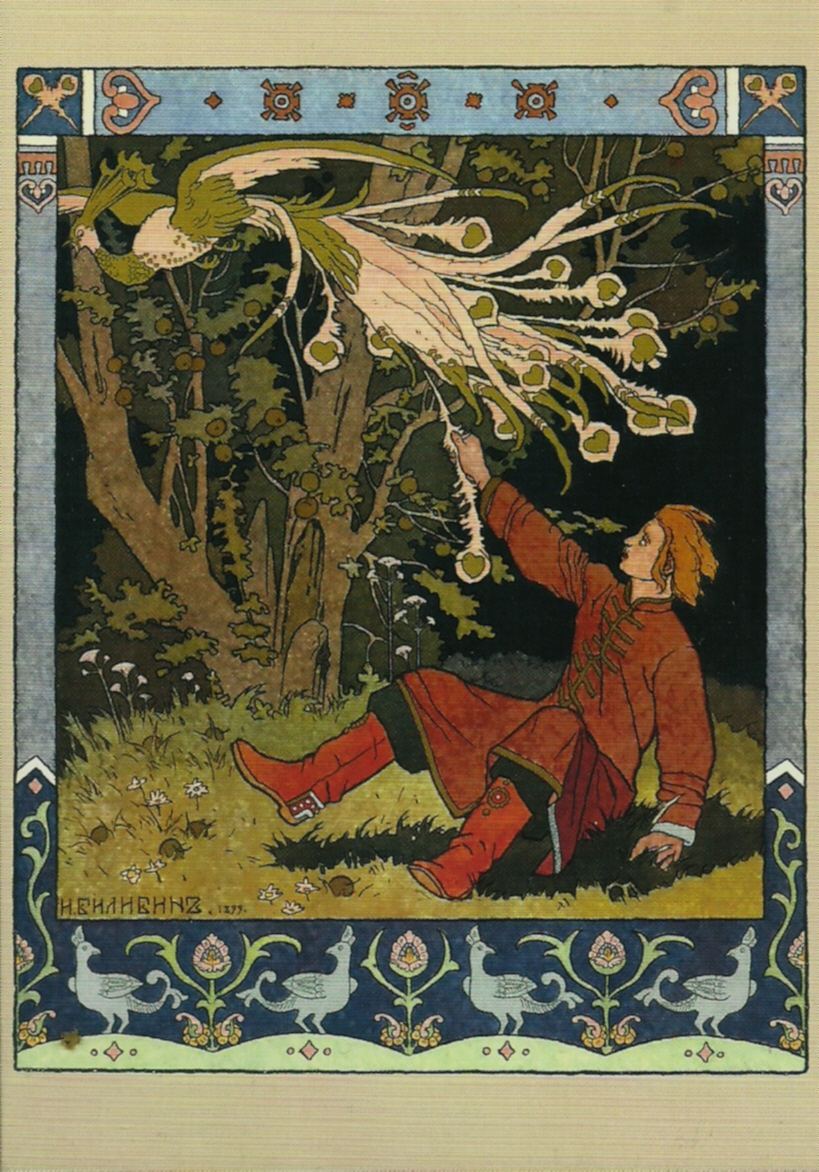
Ivan Tsarevich catches the Firebird who tries to steal golden apples in Tsarevitch Ivan, the Fire Bird and the Gray Wolf

Many European fairy tales begin when golden apples are stolen from a king, usually by a bird:

- "Tsarevitch Ivan, the Fire Bird and the Gray Wolf" (Russian)
- "The Golden Bird" (German)
- "The Golden Mermaid" (Romanian)
- "The Nine Peahens and the Golden Apples" (Serbian)
- "Prâslea the Brave and the Golden Apples" (Romanian, where the thief is not a bird but a zmeu)
- "The Three Brothers and the Golden Apple" (Bulgarian, where the thief is not a bird but a zmey)
- "The White Snake" (German)

== Modern literature ==
The William Butler Yeats poem "The Song of the Wandering Aengus", has the lines:

I will find out where she has gone
And kiss her lips and take her hands;
And walk among long dappled grass,
And pluck till time and times are done
The silver apples of the moon,
The golden apples of the sun.

The Augusta, Lady Gregory play called The Golden Apple: A Play for Kiltartan Children is a fable in the invented Kiltartan dialect based on Irish mythology and folklore.

The Golden Apples is the name of Southern writer, Eudora Welty's, fourth short story collection, published in 1949. The stories are interrelated and center around the citizens of the fictional town of Morgana, Mississippi.

A golden apple plays a crucial role in the climax of David Mitchell's sixth novel The Bone Clocks, published by Random House in 2014.

== Discordianism ==
The contemporary religion Discordianism draws upon the Golden Apple of the goddess Eris, also known as the "Apple of Discord", which Eris used to set off the conflict among the goddesses of Olympus that led to the Trojan War because she was not invited to a party (the so-called "Original Snub"). Emblazoned upon the apple is the word "Kallisti" ("to the fairest"). The golden apple can be seen as a metaphor for a practical joke meant to cause cognitive dissonance in the target.

== Identity and use in other languages ==
=== Argan fruit ===
Michael Hübner has suggested that the fruit of the Argan tree, endemic to the Sous Valley in present-day Morocco, may be the golden apples of the Hesperides. Arguing that the location matches most closely the description given in classical texts of Atlantis and the garden of the Hesperides, he notes that the ripe fruits look like small golden apples and have an aroma like baked apples. He equates the fruit, the seeds of which produce Argan oil, with Plato's account of Atlantean fruits "which afford liquid and solid food and unguents", and proposes that the trees' almost reptilian-scale like bark and thorns may have inspired the mythical guardian dragon of the golden apples, Ladon.

=== Oranges ===
In many languages, the orange is referred to as a "golden apple". For example, the Latin pomum aurantium literally describes oranges as "golden apples". Other languages, like German, Finnish, Hebrew, and Russian, have more complex etymologies for the word "orange" that can be traced back to the same idea.

In later years it was thought that the "golden apples" of myth might have actually been oranges, a fruit unknown to Europe and the Mediterranean before the Middle Ages. Under this assumption, the Greek botanical name chosen for all citrus species was Hesperidoeidē (Ἑσπεριδοειδῆ, "hesperidoids"). It was also used by Carl Linnaeus, who gave the name Hesperides to an order containing the genus Citrus, in allusion to the golden apples of the Hesperides, and is preserved in the term Hesperidium for the fruits of citrus and some other plants.

=== Quinces ===
The term "golden apple" is used to refer to the quince, a fruit originating in the Middle East.

=== Tomatoes ===
The tomato, unknown to the ancient world of the Greeks, is known as the pomodoro in Italian, meaning "golden apple" (from pomo d'oro).

== Popular culture ==
Golden apples are also items that are featured in video games such as Minecraft, Pokémon Mystery Dungeon, Assassin's Creed, and Hello Neighbor. In the TV-series Animated Tales of the World, the episode "The Tree with the Golden Apples" revolves around the golden apple-tree on an island. An old man asks three brothers to sail to the island and whoever brings him a golden apple gets his daughter's hand in marriage.

== See also ==
- Apples and oranges
- Forbidden fruit
- Front Deutscher Äpfel
- Golden delicious
- The Golden Apples of the Sun
- Hesperidium
- Iðunn
- Jambudvīpa
