= Silver Branch =

Symbol in Irish mythology and literature

The Silver Branch or Silver Bough (Irish: An Craobh Airgid) is a symbol found in Irish mythology and literature.

Featured in the Irish poem The Voyage of Bran and the narrative Cormac's Adventure in the Land of Promise, it represents entry into the Celtic Otherworld or Tír na nÓg.

== Literary examples ==
=== Voyage of Bran ===
In Imram Brain ("Voyage of Bran"), the silver apple branch with white apple blossoms was brought to Bran mac Febail by a mysterious woman, who disclosed that the branch of white silver (Irish: findargat) was from Emain (or Emne), presumably the land where she hailed from. After singing verses describing her land as the place of delight (with poetic names such as the "Plain of White Silver"); thereafter she slipped away, and the branch sprang back to her, with Bran having no power to keep it in his grasp. Bran then mounted on a voyage and reached the Land of Women (Tír inna m-Ban), which is Emain, at least according to some commentators. (Note: Kuno Meyer who edited the text merely footnoted the gloss in the manuscript ".i. nomen regionis", which imparts no further information beyond this being a place name, and noting that the variant Emne in the text is the nominative form.) Some other commentators venture the silver branch Bran saw originated in Emain Ablach, even though that extended form does not appear in the text of the Imram Brain. (Note: Emain Ablach is one of the names of Manannán's dominion in Altram Tige Dá Medar: "Manannan’s house at Emain Ablach"Emain Ablach".)

The land of the branch turned out to be some sort of "Otherworld", for even though Bran and his crew believed they tarried at the Land of Women for a year, it turned out to be many years, even centuries, so that when they approached Ireland, they learned that they had become ancient history, and a member who tried to set foot on land turned into ashes.

Eleanor Hull wrote a paper drawing parallel between this silver branch and the golden bough of Roman legend which was required for entry into the Underworld (Pluto). In like manner, the branch (silver or otherwise) is an object given to a human invited by a denizen of the Otherworld to visit his/her realm, offering "a clue binding the desired one to enter". One of the paralleling examples was the branch seen by Bran.

W. H. Evans-Wentz offered a similar opinion, saying, "the silver branch of the sacred apple-tree bearing blossoms.. borne by the Fairy Woman is a passport to Tír n-aill (the Celtic Otherworld)".

=== Cormac's adventure ===
A magical silver branch with three golden apples belonged to the sea deity Manannán mac Lir and was given to the high king Cormac mac Airt in the narrative Echtra Cormaic or "Cormac's Adventure in the Land of Promise". The sea god initially visited Cormac's ramparts (at Tara) as an unidentified warrior from a land "wherein there is nought save truth, and there is neither age nor decay nor gloom", etc., later identified as the Land of Promise (Tír Tairngire). The branch created magical soporific music that assuaged those afflicted with injury or illness to sleep, including "women in child-bed". (Note: This tale exists in several manuscripts of the fourteenth and fifteenth centuries; i. e. Book of Ballymote, and Yellow Book of Lecan, as edited and translated by Stokes, in Irische Texts, III. i. 183–229; cf. Voy. of Bran, i. 190 ff.; cf. Le Cycle Myth. Irl., pp. 326–33.)

In a variant text under the title "How Cormac mac Airt Got his Branch", (Note: Irish: Fághail Chraoibhe Cormai, cross-referenced to (equated with) Echtra Cormaic.) the same object is not described as a silver branch, but rather a "glittering fairy branch with nine apples of red gold". (Note: The manuscript source is unclear for this variant edited and translated by O'Grady's and published by the Ossianic Society.) (Note: Jacob's version is a condensation of the O'Grady translation. Lady Gregory describes Manannán's gift as a "shining branch having nine apples of red gold.")

Here, the branch possessed the additional ability make people forget their woes. (Note: The branch also has the property that "no sorrow or depression could rest upon the person who heard it" in the Book of Fermoy version of "The Finding of Cormac's Branch".) Cormac bargained his wife and children away to obtain the branch, and when the wife and daughter learn of this to their utter disheartening, Cormac jiggles the branch to cause their sorrows to depart. This ability is reminiscent of the grief-soothing lapdog Petit Crû and its jingling bell in Tristan and Isolde, as pointed out by Gertrude Schoepperle.

=== Dialogue of the Two Sages ===
Also, in Immacallam in dá Thuarad, or The Dialogue of the Two Sages, the mystic symbol used by gods, fairies, magicians, and by all initiates who know the mystery of life and death, is thus described as a Druid symbol:–'Neidhe' (a young bard who aspired to succeed his father as chief poet of Ulster), "made his journey with a silver branch over him. (Note: Among the early ecclesiastical manuscripts of the so-called Prophecies.) The Anradhs, or poets of the second order, carried a silver branch, but the Ollamhs, or chief poets, carried a branch of gold; all other poets bore a branch of bronze."

== In popular culture ==
- The Silver Bough is a work on Celtic folklore by Florence Marian McNeill, a Scottish folklorist.
- The Silver Branch is the title of the second book in Rosemary Sutcliff's children's book series The Roman Britain Trilogy.
- The Silver Bough is also the title of a 1948 novel by Scottish novelist Neil M. Gunn. He references frequently the Silver Bough song sung by the protagonist's landlady and the protagonist has a musical silver bough with gold apples crafted for the landlady's granddaughter
- The Silver Branch documentary (Katrina Costello) is a celebration of the people and place of the mythical landscape of the Burren. The protagonist (Patrick McCormack) references the Silver Branch myth, in his search for unity, in being part of nature and letting nature work on us to find our place in the world.
