= The Voyage of Bran =

Medieval Irish narrative

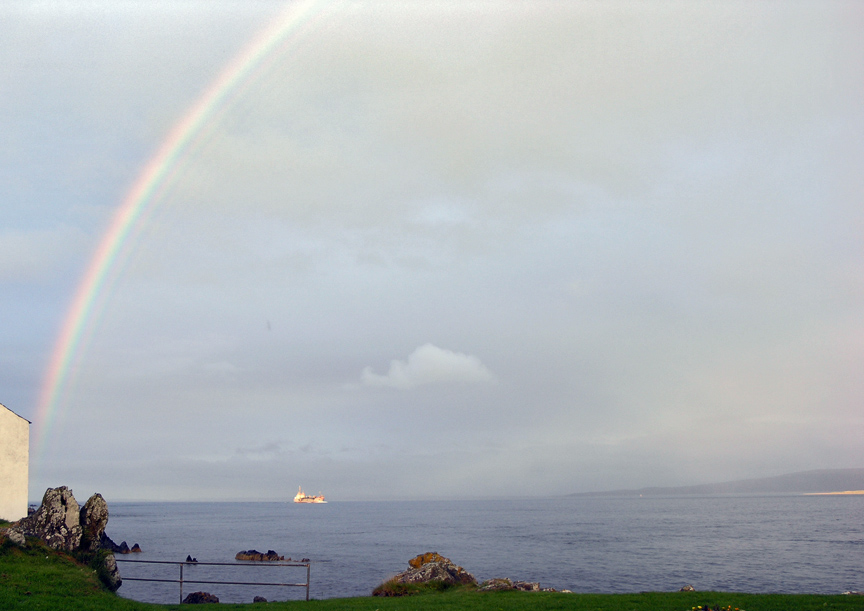
Ship approaching Greencastle on Lough Foyle

The Voyage of Bran (Old Irish: Immram Brain [maic Febail], meaning "The Voyage of Bran [son of Febail]") is a medieval seventh- or eighth-century Irish language narrative.

== Sources ==
The date of composition has been assigned to the late 7th or early 8th century, and the text is known to have been included in the lost 8th century codex Cín Dromma Snechtai.

Although the conventional title Immram Brain identifies the tale-type as an immram (‘voyage’ tale), some scholars argue the work does not count among the genuine immrama, but should rather be considered an echtra (‘adventure’ tale) and the title Echtrae Brain should be adopted, for indeed Echtra Bran maic Febail is the title (and categorisation) that occurs in the 11th century tale-list. (Note: "List B", embedded in the story Airec menman Uraird maic Coisse. The story is preserved in the manuscripts RIA 23 N. 10, Rawlinson B 512,and Harleian 5280.) The constructed title Echtrae Brain ocus Tomaidm Locha Febuil has also been suggested.

The tale may derive from the "otherworldly journey" material from Irish mythology, possibly of pan-Celtic origin (Note: Commonality with acquisition of otherworldly treasures, named in Welsh triads, as according to Carney.) However there is a dissenting camp of scholars who hold that "these tales [echtrai] are literary compositions written within the Christian period".

The concept of "voyage" has been widely used across the world in that time. While this specific set comes from Ireland, it can be compared with Classical sources such as the Odyssey and the Aeneid, some Scandinavian tales as well as some Brittonic tales told on what is now the United Kingdom, particularly those preserved from Wales (Y Mabinogion) and Brittany including Tristan and Yseult. The most recent translation is by Séamus Mac Mathúna (1985).

== Synopsis ==
Structurally, The Voyage of Bran is a combination of poetry and prose, with many short stanzas punctuated by longer, prose narration. These prose narrations are known as Narrative Envelopes.

The tale can be summarised as follows:

Bran mac Febail (modern spelling: Bran mac Feabhail) embarks upon a quest to the Otherworld. One day while Bran is walking, he hears beautiful music, so beautiful, in fact, that it lulls him to sleep. Upon awakening, he sees a beautiful silver branch in white bloom in front of him. He returns to his royal house, and among his retinue he spots a strangely dressed Otherworld woman, who identifies the branch to be from an apple tree (or tree of some fruit) growing in land of Emain (or Emne), (Note: The land is initially called Emain (¶3, ¶10) bu later given as Emne(¶19, ¶60).) and proceeds to sing a poem describing this Otherworld.

Emain is a place of "lasting weather" (perpetually like spring or summer), without want of food or water, free from sickness or despair; it is otherwise called (or has a place called) Aircthech (‘Bountiful Land’) where "dragonstones" and crystals fall. (Note: Dragonstone, or dragontia in Latin, is written of by Pliny, and supposedly occurs in brains of dragons. Since its mentioned in Immram Brain ¶12 seems to suggest it washes up in the sea, one theory is that the Irish apparently associated it with amber.) She instructs Bran to embark on a sea voyage to Emain, which she reveals to be a Land of Women, and disappears with the branch. Bran gathers three companies of nine men apiece for the voyage, and his foster brothers were put in charge of each company.

After traveling by boat for two days and nights, the group encounters the ocean deity Manannán mac Lir riding a chariot over the sea towards them. Manannán explains that while this may seem like a body of water to Bran and his crew rowing the coracle, it appears as an otherworldly flowery plain to the god. Manannán also foretells the birth of his son as Mongán mac Fiachnai in Ireland. Manannán then informs Bran that he will reach his goal by sundown.

After parting ways with Manannán mac Lir, Bran's voyagers make a stop at the Isle of Joy, where the inhabitants just laugh and stare, and will not answer to calls. When Bran sends a scout ashore, he starts to laugh and gape just like the others. Bran abandons this crewman and sails on.

He now approaches the Land of Women but is hesitant to go ashore. The leader of the land casts a magical clew (ball of yarn) at him, which sticks to his hand. She then tugs the boat ashore, and each man pairs off with a woman, Bran with the leader. There are three times nine "couches" available for all of them.

During what seems to be one year's span, many more years have elapsed, while the men feast happily in the Land of Women, until Nechtán mac Collbrain feels homesickness stir within him. The leader of the women is reluctant to let them go, and cautions them not to step upon the shores of Ireland, and counsels them to retrieve the man left abandoned on the Island of Joy. The group nears the shores of Ireland, and Bran shouts his own name to the people gathered on shore, but they do not recognize the name except as ancient legend. Nechtán cannot restrain himself and jumps off the boat, but the moment he sets foot ashore he turns into ashes.

Bran and his company relate the rest of their story to the gathered people, and also hands over a written record of their voyage inscribed in ogam letters, and then sail across the sea, never to be seen again.

== Parallels ==
The poem shares similar themes and elements with other Irish immrama, such as The Voyage of Brendan and The Voyage of Máel Dúin, both written in early to mid-900.

For example, both Bran's and Máel Dúin's voyagers reach an island of laughter or laughing people, and in each case a crew member is left abandoned. And the material may possibly have been borrowed by the Navigatio sancti Brendani abbatis, the Latin work on St. Brendan's voyage. Heinrich Zimmer contended that it led to the episode of the third latecomer being abducted by the demons (Navigatio 24), though Walter Haug did not see this as an obvious parallel. A different episode open to comparison is Brendan's abandonment of one of the monks to the psalm-singing choirs (Navigatio 17), although the situation in Brendan's case is a happy one and contrastive to Bran.

Elsewhere, Bran is told of a tree with holy birds that all sing at the same time, similar to what Brendan encounters in his voyage, and Mael Duin encounters trees full of birds as well.

However, some scholars emphasise that commonality of the voyage is only a superficial similarity, since the true immrama are "exclusively ecclesiastical in inspiration" in contrast to the echtrae (including Bran's Voyage) whose central theme is the voyage to the Celtic Otherworld. However, there are also specific points of close similarity, because the immrama do "draw to a limited extent on the motifs of the native secular literate" (including the echtrae).

=== Saint Brendan ===
The Voyage of Bran may have influenced the later story of Saint Brendan's voyage, owing perhaps to the similarity of the names of the leading figures. The Navigatio Sancti Brendani Abbatis stands out among other immrama since it mentions the terra repromissionis, which translates into Irish as Tír Tairngire ("Land of Promise"), which is the term for the Otherworld in the non-Christian tales.

The stories are also similar in that at one point, one of the travellers is exorcised or left behind on an island, either by free will or as punishment for a sin.

=== Voyage of Máel Dúin ===
The Voyage of Bran has many parallels to The Voyage of Máel Dúin.

- The island of laughter is a common theme. Bran and company visit the "Island of Joy." After being sent by Bran to investigate the island, one of Bran's men will not speak to the crew, only gaping at them, just like the inhabitants of the island. The man is then abandoned and left on the island. Similarly in The Voyage of Máel Dúin, one of Máel Dúin's men is sent to investigate, cannot stop laughing, loses the ability to recognize his crew and is eventually left behind.
- The motif of the magical pulling yarn is another motif found in both works. Bran and company reach the "Island of Women", where they are welcomed by many women, fed well, and one of the women uses a ball of yarn in order to magically ensnare Bran. In The Voyage of Máel Dúin, the crew reaches an island that is home to seventeen women, who are hospitable to them. When they try to leave, one of the women throws a ball of yarn that magically clings to Diurán's hand. But this motif occurs additionally in other works, e.g. the Irish account of the Argonauts prefixed to Togail Troí.
- At the end of the tale, one of Bran's men jumps from the coracle after having been magically at sea for hundreds of years. Upon touching dry soil, he is turned into ash. In The Voyage of Máel Dúin, one of the foster brothers tries to steal a necklet and is burnt to ash by a magical cat.

=== Mabinogion ===
The Voyage of Bran may also be compared to the Welsh text Branwen Daughter of Llŷr from the Mabinogi. The parallels are not along the lines of plot, as with The Voyage of Brendan and The Voyage of Máel Dúin, but rather in similarity in the names of characters (Brân son of Febal vs. Bran son of Llŷr). (Note: Carney (2007a), pp. 168ff and Carney (2007b) Ireland and the Grail, pp. 60–64 apud Sims-Williams.)

But the parallel between the two figures is another point on which Celticists are of divided opinion. (Note: Patrick Sims-Williams states that he himself is less persuaded than Carney about deriving the Welsh Brân from the Irish voyager. He also names Proinsias Mac Cana and Glyn E. Jones among skeptics, and Rachel Bromwich as proponent.) It is pointed out that if Manawydan fab Llŷr has an exact counterpart in Manannan mac Lir, then Brân has an Irish counterpart named Brón, though the latter is quite obscure.

=== Classical sources ===
It has been pointed out that certain episodes in the Irish immrama bear striking resemblance to passages in classical works, such as the Odyssey or the Aeneid. Zimmer argued that The Voyage of Máel Dúin derived from the Aeneid, but this hypothesis was dismantled by William Flint Thrall.

The mention of the sea god Manannán producing a human scion (Mongan) is analogous to Poseidon having ten sons begotten on human mothers residing on Atlantis as described by Plato, according to Thomas Johnson Westropp. There is also a close resemblance between Atlantis being surrounded by concentric ringed walls made of metal (including orichalcum) and brazen ramparts around islands described in the immrama (Máel Dúin; Uí Corra), and some resemblance to the findruine or white bronze "feet" or pillars underpinning the land of Emain, which the mysterious woman sings of in the Voyage of Bran.

Alfred Nutt expressed scepticism over the notion that the Celtic Otherworld was founded on the Classical Greek Elysium, and contrasts the free-love milieu of the Land of Women in Bran's Voyage with Virgil's Elysium of chastity.

== Manuscript sources ==
- Dublin, RIA, Lebor na hUidre, pp. 121a-24 (originally, f. 78). Diplomatic edition: 10088-10112.
- Oxford, Bodleian Library, MS Rawlinson B 512, f. 119al-120b2 (originally, f. 71–72).
- Dublin, RIA MS 23 N 10, pp. 56–61.
- London, British Library, Egerton MS 88, f. 11b (col. 2) – 12a and f. 13a (cols. 1–2).
- London, British Library, Harley MS 5280, f. 43a-44b.
- Stockholm, Royal Library, MS Vitterhet Engelsk II, f. 1b-4.
- London, British Library, Add MS 35090.
- Dublin, TCD, MS H 4.22, f. 48b17-50a6 and f. 40–53. Incomplete.
- Dublin, TCD, Yellow Book of Lecan (=H 2.16, MS 1318). Cols. 395–398.

== Editions and translations ==
- Mac Mathúna, Séamus, ed. (1985). Immram Brain - Bran's Journey into the Land of the Women. Tübingen: Max Niemeyer Verlag. Irish Text @CELT.
- Murphy, Gerard, ed. (1956). "Manannán, God of the Sea, Describes his Kingdom to Bran and Predicts the Birth of Mongán." In Early Irish lyrics, eighth to twelfth century, ed. Gerard Murphy. Oxford: Clarendon Press, pp. 92–100.

The poem "Caíni amra laisin m-Bran" as preserved in MS 23 N 10. Irish Text @CELT.

- Hamel, A.G. van, ed. (1941), Immrama, Mediaeval and Modern Irish 10, Dublin: Dublin Institute for Advanced Studies
- Meyer, Kuno (1895), Voyage of Bran son of Febal to the land of the living, vol. 2 vols., Alfred Nutt (summary), London: D. Nutt; Nutt (1897), vol. 2.

== See also ==
- Aeneid
- Gulliver's Travels
- Odyssey
- Sinbad the Sailor
- Ranka (legend)
- Urashima Tarō
