= Mongán mac Fíachnai =

Mongán mac Fíachnai (died c. 625) was an Irish prince of the Cruthin, a son of Fíachnae mac Báetáin. Little is certainly known of Mongán's life as only his death is recorded in the Irish annals. He appears as a character in the Cycles of the Kings where he is said to have been the son of Manannán mac Lir and perhaps a reincarnation of the legendary hero Finn mac Cumaill of the Fenian Cycle.

His origin story is told in the Compert Mongáin found in the Yellow Book of Lecan and the Lebor na hUidre.

== Compert Mongáin ==
The tale Compert Mongáin (the Conception of Mongán), which survives in three variants, has Mongán fathered on Fiachnae's wife Cáintigern by the sea-god Manannán mac Lir while Fíachnae campaigned alongside Áedán mac Gabráin of Dál Riata. The versions have different accounts of how this came about, all of which agree that some form of bargain was struck whereby Fiachnae's life was saved by Manannán in return for a night with Cáintigern. An early version of this tale is found in the Immram Brain where Manannán prophecies Mongán's birth and near divine nature to Bran. Although the surviving versions of the tale are from the 10th or 11th century, earlier versions are believed to have been included in the lost Cín Dromma Snechtai manuscript. The verses in which the claims of Mongán's divine parentage and tutoring are made are described by Charles-Edwards are "literary conceit" and by Carney as "poetic hyperbole", the presumed original intent being to vaunt Mongán's seamanship.

Manannán takes Mongán away with him to Tír Tairngire—the land of promise, an otherworld similar to Tír na nÓg—where he learned shapeshifting and other esoteric knowledge. While Mongán is in the otherworld, his father is killed by Fiachnae mac Demmáin, an event which the Irish annals place after Mongán's death. Mongán's ability to change his shape is alluded to in the 9th century tale De Chophur in dá Muccado (The quarrel of the two swineherds), found in the Book of Leinster, which is one of the stories setting the scene for the Táin Bó Cuailnge.

The Ulstermen ask Manannán to send Mongán to rule over them, but he remains in the otherworld for a further ten years, returning to Ulster when he is sixteen. An agreement is made that Ulster will be divided between Fiachnae mac Demmáin and Mongán, and that Mongán will marry Fiachnae's daughter Dub Lacha. Mongán later kills his father-in-law in revenge for his father's death, again chronologically at odds with the surviving record which has Fiachnae mac Demmáin killed several years after Mongán.

== Finn reborn ==
One tale recounts a dispute between Mongán and the poet Forgoll, Forgoll being perhaps based on traditions about the historical poet Dallan Forgaill. Forgoll claims to know how Fothad Airgthech, a legendary High King of Ireland died, but Mongán says he is wrong. Forgoll threatens to curse and satirise Mongán for this insult to his knowledge and will settle for nothing less than Mongán's wife Breothigernd in reparation. A mysterious stranger appears who claims that Mongán was with him when he slew Fothad, and proves Forgall wrong. The story ends by revealing that the stranger was the legendary fianna hero Caílte mac Rónáin and that Mongán was the reincarnation of Finn mac Cumhaill.

== Otherworld ==
Two short tales survive which associate Mongán with the otherworld, both dating from the late 10th or early 11th century.

One is Scél Mongáin, a story concerning Mongán and the poet Forgoll. This has the two meet a poor student whom Mongán takes pity on and sends to the otherworld to bring back gold, silver and a precious stone, the silver which the student is to keep for himself. Little occurs in the tale which concentrates on the magnificence of the otherworld.

The second, Tucait Baili Mongáin ("What caused Mongán's Frenzy"), is said to take place in the year in which Ciarán of Clonmacnoise died and Diarmait mac Cerbaill became King of Tara following the death of Túathal Máelgarb, events dated to the year AD 549. Mongán's wife Findtigernd asks him to recount his journey to the otherworld. When they are at the hill of Uisnech, a supernatural hailstorm comes on. When it ends Mongán, his wife, his poet, and seven companions, find a hall ringed by trees. They enter, are greeted by the inhabitants, and Mongán is given to drink, after which he recounts his journey. Although it seems as though they are in the house for only a short time, when they leave a year has passed, and they are now at Rath Mor, Mongán's home near modern Larne, 150 miles away.

== Wives and children and poets ==
In the tale of Forgoll and Fothad, Mongán is said to be married to Breothigernd. Tucait Baili Mongáin names his wife Findtigernd. The Banshenchas or Lore of Women contained in the Book of Leinster, attributed to a Leinster poet named Gilla Mo-Dutu (died 1147), also names Dub Lacha as Mongán's wife.

An alternative version of the Compert Mongáin, Compert Mongáin ocus Serc Duibe Lacha do Mongán (The conception of Mongán and Mongán's love for Dub Lacha), contains a lengthy romance concerning Mongán and another wife, Dub Lacha, daughter of Fiachnae mac Demmáin, in which Brandub mac Echach is a major character. This story makes frequent use of Mongán's otherworldly shapeshifting and magical powers. Austin Clarke's play The plot succeeds; a poetic pantomime (1950) is a comedy based on the tale of Mongán and Dub Lacha.

A third tale concerning Mongán and a poet, this time Eochaid Rígéiges, again perhaps based on the historical poet Dallan Forgaill, purports to explain why he had no children. The tale recounts a journey by Mongán and Eochaid where they are asked to explain the meaning of various place names—a branch of poetical learning called dindshenchas—and on each occasion Eochaid is shown up by Mongán. As a result, Eochaid curses Mongán so that he will have no noble-born children and that his descendants will be peasants.

Yeats took Mongán as a subject in his writings, including the poems "Mongan laments the Change that has come upon him and his Beloved" and "Mongan thinks of his past Greatness" (The Wind Among the Reeds, 1899).

== Death ==
- Mionannála from Egerton 1782: 615–643 (Suibne Menn, Fíachna mac Báetáin, Mongán) http://www.ucc.ie/celt/published/G100027/text002.html

The record of Mongán's death in the Annals of Tigernach has him killed by a stone thrown by one Artúr son of Bicior, described as a Briton or perhaps, following Kuno Meyer's reading, a Pict. It is accompanied by a poem attributed to Bécc Bairrche mac Blathmaic, king of Ulaid. Whitley Stokes translated it as follows:

The wind blows cold over Islay;
there are youths approaching in Kintyre:
they will do a cruel deed thereby,
they will slay Mongán, son of Fíachnae.

== Bibliography ==
- Annals of Ulster AD 431–1201, CELT: Corpus of Electronic Texts, 2003
- Annals of Tigernach, CELT: Corpus of Electronic Texts, 1996
- Anderson, Alan Orr (1922), Early Sources of Scottish History A.D. 500 to 1286, vol. I (1990 revised & corrected ed.), Stamford: Paul Watkins, ISBN 1-871615-03-8
- Byrne, Francis John (1973), Irish Kings and High-Kings, London: Batsford, ISBN 0-7134-5882-8
- Carney, James (2005), "Language and literature to 1169", in Ó Cróinín, Daibhí (ed.), Prehistoric and early Ireland, A New History of Ireland, vol. I, Oxford: Oxford University Press, pp. 451–510, ISBN 978-0-19-922665-8
- Charles-Edwards, T. M., Early Christian Ireland, Cambridge: Cambridge University Press, ISBN 0-521-36395-0
- Kinsella, Thomas (1970), The Tain. Translated from the Irish epic Táin Bó Cuailnge, Oxford: Oxford University Press, ISBN 0-19-281090-1
- Mac Cana, Proinsias (2007), "Ireland and Wales in the Middle Ages: an overview", in Jankulak, Karen; Wooding, Jonathan M. (eds.), Ireland and Wales in the Middle Ages, Dublin: Four Courts Press, pp. 17–45, ISBN 978-1-85182-748-0
- MacKillop, James (1998), Oxford Dictionary of Celtic Mythology, Oxford: Oxford University Press, ISBN 0-19-860967-1
- Meyer, Kuno (1895), The Voyage of Bran son of Febal to the Land of the Living, London: D. Nutt
- White, Nora (2006), Compert Mongáin and three other early Mongán tales, Maynooth Medieval Irish Texts, vol. 5, Maynooth: Department of Old and Middle Irish, National University of Ireland, ISSN 1393-970X
- Wiley, Dan (2004), The Cycles of the Kings, archived from the original on 27 December 2008
