= Manannán mac Lir =

Sea god in Irish mythology

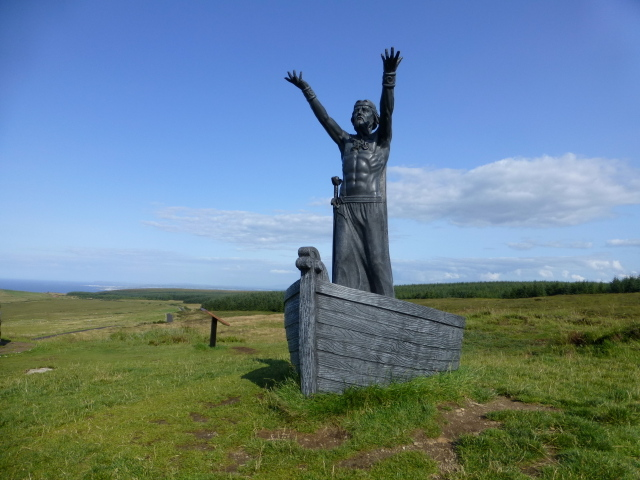
Manannán mac Lir, sculpture by John Sutton at Gortmore, Magilligan, County Londonderry, Northern Ireland.

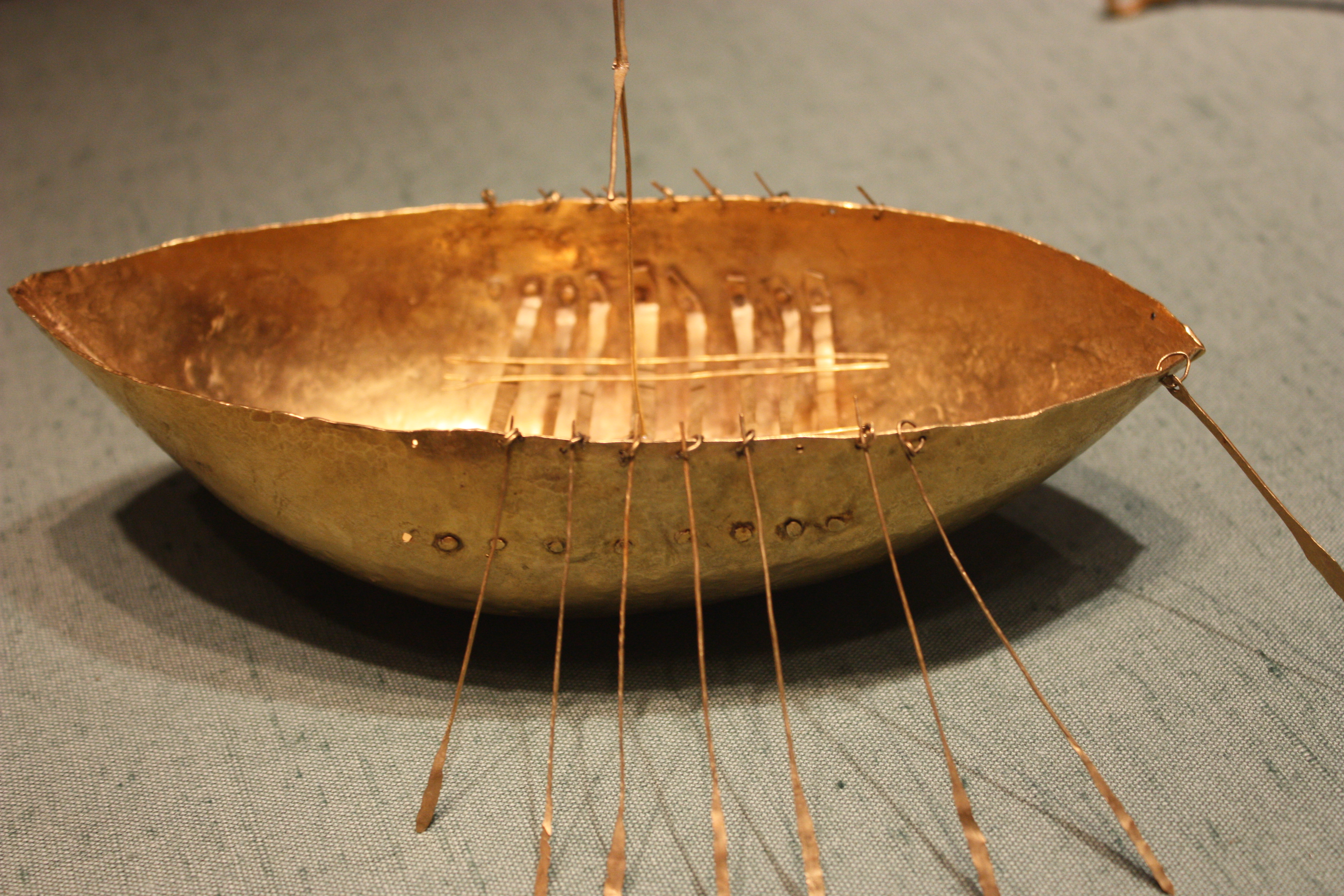
The boat from the 1st century BC Broighter Hoard, which was found near Magilligan and may be a votive offering to Manannán

Manannán or Manann, also known as Manannán mac Lir ('son of the Sea'), is a sea god, warrior and king of the otherworld in Gaelic (Irish, Manx and Scottish) mythology who is one of the Tuatha Dé Danann.

He is seen as a ruler and guardian of the otherworld and his dominion is referred by such names as Emain Ablach (or Emhain Abhlach, 'Isle of Apple Trees'), Mag Mell ('Plain of Delights'), or Tír Tairngire ('Land of Promise'). He is described as over-king of the surviving Tuatha Dé after the advent of humans (Milesians) and uses the mist of invisibility (féth fíada) to cloak the whereabouts of his home as well as the sidhe dwellings of the others.

He is said to own a self-navigating boat named Sguaba Tuinne ('Wave-sweeper'), a horse Aonbharr which can course over water as well as land and a deadly strength-sapping sword named Fragarach, though the list does not end there.

Manannán appears also in Scottish and Manx legend, where he is known as Manannan beg mac y Leir ('little Manannan, son of the Sea'). The Isle of Man (Mannin) is generally thought to be named after him, though some have said he is named after the island. He is cognate with the Welsh figure Manawydan fab Llŷr.

== Names ==
Manannán is given several names, bynames, epithets and surnames or patronymics. His name is spelt Manandán in Old Irish, Manannán in Modern Irish, Manannàn in Scottish Gaelic and Mannan in Manx Gaelic.

Some of the names equated with Manannán include:

- Oirbsiu, Oirbsen or Orbsen
- Duartaine Ó Duartaine
- Cathal Ó Cein (Cathal means 'great warrior')
- Gilla de ('Boyservant')
- Gilla Decair ('Troublesome Boyservant')

=== Etymology ===
According to some, his name is derived from the Isle of Man with the -an suffix indicating 'one who is from' the named place. The island's name itself may come from a Celtic word for 'mountain' or 'rise', as the Isle of Man rises from the sea on the horizon. Alternatively, it may come from an earlier Proto-Indo-European root for 'water' or 'wetness'. In medieval Irish tradition, it appears that Manannán came to be considered eponymous to the island (rather than vice versa).

=== Surname and Epithets ===
The most common epithets for Manannán reinforce his association with war and the sea. Mac Lir means 'son of the Sea' or 'son of Ler', a sea god whose name means 'Sea'.

It has been suggested that his mythological father Ler's role as sea god was taken over by Manannán. Manannán's other surname mac Alloit or mac Alloid means 'son of the Soil/Land', so that Manannán is effectively son of the sea and land.

== In Irish mythology ==
Manannán appears in all of the cycles of Irish mythology, although he only plays a prominent role in a limited number of tales.

- In the Ulster Cycle: Tochmarc Étaíne ('The Wooing of Étaín'), Serglige Con Culainn ('The Wasting Sickness of Cúchulainn' or 'The Sickbed of Cúchulainn'), Tochmarc Luaine ('The Wooing of Luan')
- In the Cycles of the Kings: Immram Brain maic Febail ('The Voyage of Bran son of Febal'), Echtra Cormaic maic Airt ('The Adventure of Cormac mac Airt'), Compert Mongáin ('The Birth of Mongán')
- In the Mythological Cycle: Lebor Gabála Érenn ('The Book of Invasions'), First Recension; Altram Tige Dá Medar ('The Nourishment of the Houses of Two Milk-vessels')
- other Old Irish texts: Sanas Cormaic ('Cormac's Glossary')

In the Ulster Cycle tale "The Wasting Sickness of Cúchulainn", Manannán's wife, Fand, has an ill-fated affair with the warrior Cúchulainn. When Fand sees that Cúchulainn's jealous wife, Emer, is worthy of him (and accompanied by a troop of armed women), she decides to return to Manannán, who then shakes his cloak (brat[t]) of forgetfulness between Fand and Cúchulainn which causes them to not be able to remember each other.

=== Characteristics ===
Manannán rode his chariot over the sea, meeting with Bran and his crew sailing by ship, in the tale "The Voyage of Bran son of Febal", considered an early work. In this story, he told Bran that the sea was not actually water to him but rather "a happy plain with profusion of flowers." He goes on to tell Bran about how he is heading to Ireland to have relations with Caintigern who would go on to bear Mongán.

In late sources, Manannán visits the land of the living. His movement is compared to the wind, a hawk or swallow and sometimes takes the form of a thundering wheel rolling across the landscape, such as in the "Pursuit of the Gilla Decair", a 16th-century comic tale. There is also the local lore that Manannán moved like a wheel turning on his three legs, a tradition widespread on the Isle of Man, but also found in some eastern counties of Leinster according to John O'Donovan, though this folklore was unfamiliar to Whitley Stokes.

==== Abode ====
Manannán is lord and guardian of the Blessed Isles, Emhain Abhlach ('Isle of Apple-trees', cognate with the Avalon of the Welsh Arthurian cycle) and Mag Mell or Magh Meall ('Plain of Delights'). Manannán sings a verse describing his sea as Mag Mell, in "The Voyage of Bran", stating that the steeds on the plain cannot be seen, thus alluding to his concealment of his dwelling using the shroud of invisibility (féth fíada). (Note: "In Mag Mell of many flowers / There are many steeds on its surface / Though them thou seest not".) Emhain Abhlach was the place of origin of the Silver Branch brought to Bran.

Manannán is also said to dwell in the Land of Promise (Tír Tairngire), as in the tale "The Adventure of Cormac mac Airt".

==== Over-king ====
An over-king's role for Manannán among the Tuatha Dé Danann is described in the narrative Altram Tige Dá Medar ('The Nourishment of the Houses of Two Milk-vessels') in the 14th to the 15th century manuscript, the Book of Fermoy. Máire MacNeill gave a summary of the work. (Note: Manx writer Arthur William Moore gave a crude paraphrase from the Book of Fermoy as follows: "he was a pagan, a lawgiver among the Tuatha Dé Danann, and a necromancer possessed of power to envelope himself and others in a mist, so that they could not be seen by their enemies".)

After the Tuatha Dé Danann were defeated by Érimón of the Milesians (humans), Bodb Derg was chosen as king of the Tuatha Dé Danann and Manannán as co-king or perhaps the king's overseer. (Note: "Bodb Derg was made king by the men and Manannán ... over them" (Duncan tr., p. 207)) In one passage Manannán declares he has assumed over-kingship above the petty kings of the Tuatha Dé Danann.

Manannán was tasked with allotting which sídhe or fairy mounds the surviving members of the Tuatha Dé Danann were to be settled. Manannán's own dwelling was at Emain Ablach, in the city of Cruithin na Cuan, as the tale later reveals. Manannán ensured the welfare of the Tuatha Dé Danann by concealing in the féth fíada or a mist of invisibility, (Note: Cf. Manannan's poem re Mag Mell in Imram Brain, below.) (Note: Cf. also O'Curry's copious notes for Feth Fiadha (n15), Fleagh Ghoibhneann or "Goibhneann's Banquet" and "Manannan's Pigs" (n17), in his recapitualation of this portion of the tale (which he calls the "Tale of Curchóg").) holding the Feast of Goibniu (Fleadh Goibhneann) which conferred eternal youth, (Note: A. C. L. Brown considered this to be the "ale of Góibniu the Smith".) and feeding them Manannan's Swine (Mucca Mhannanain) which gave an inexhaustible supply of food. (Note: Such a revivifying pig is also mentioned in Echtra Chormaic, and in the modern version, seven such pigs belong to the youth who is Manannan in disguise.) Arbois de Jubainville stated that these seven pigs here and Manannán's swine of the ancient text parallel each other. The routine for reviving the seven pigs was to put the bones in the sty (or manger). (Note: See § Parallels, below, for similar swine in other mythologies.)

==== Gifts to Cormac mac Airt ====
Manannán in the tale "Echtra Cormaic" owned two magical items which he gave away to Cormac mac Airt, high king of Tara: a soothing musical silver branch with apples made of gold, and the Goblet of Truth. (Note: This tale exists in several manuscripts of the fourteenth and fifteenth centuries; i. e. Book of Ballymote, and Yellow Book of Lecan, as edited and translated by Stokes. There are also other recensions, edited from the Book of Fermoy by Vernam Hall, and from an unknown modern manuscript by Standish H. O'Grady.)

Manannán initially appeared in the guise of a warrior. He described, without naming, his homeland as a place where old age, sickness, death, decay and falsehood were unknown. He eventually coaxed the king to arrive as guest to this Land of Promise (Tír Tairngire).

==== Gifts and Loans to Lugh ====
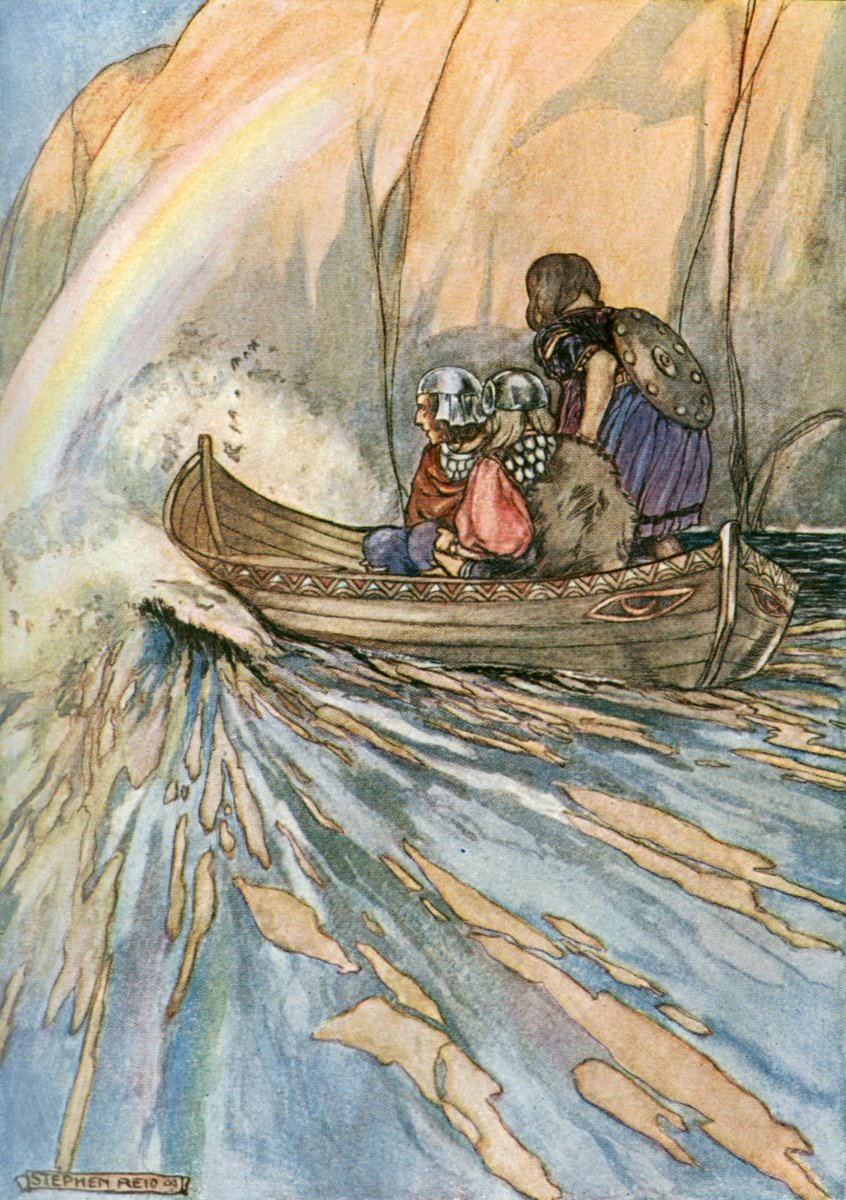
Stephen Reid's illustration of the Sons of Tuireann in Manannán's boat

Manannán had other magical items according to the Oidheadh Chloinne Tuireann, a romance that only survives in early Modern Irish recensions.

He had a self-navigating boat called "Manannán's currach" (coracle), Sguaba Tuinne (Scuab-tuinne) or 'Wave-sweeper' was self-navigating, as well as a horse that could travel over land or sea called Aonbharr of Manannan, translated in popular re-telling as "Enbarr of the Flowing Mane". (Note: Note that Scuab-tuinné is not in O'Curry's Irish text and is interpolated by him. He glosses Scuab-tuinné as the 'besom or the sweeper of the waves'.) Both the horse and boat were on loan to Lugh Lamhfada, but the Sons of Tuireann managed to borrow the boat.

Manannán also supplied Lugh with a full array of armor and weapon as the Tuatha Dé gathered their host to battle the Fomorians. Lugh rode Manannán's steed Aonbharr and was girt with Manannán's sword Fragarach ("Retaliator" or "The Answerer"). (Note: Only rendered into English as "Freagarthach" by O'Duffy.) Any wound this sword gave proved fatal and its opponent was reduced to the weakness of a woman in childbirth.

Lug also wore Manannán's helmet Cathbarr, which O'Curry amends to Cennbhearr, which he regards as a common noun and not a proper name. (Note: "Canbarr" in Joyce's retelling.) This helm was set with two precious gems on the front and one in the rear. Manannán's lúirech or body armour (Note: O'Curry (1863), pp. 162–163: "Manannan's Lorica"; O'Duffy (1888), p. 71 "armour of Manannain" (note genitive).) and Manannán's scabal (neck-piece or breastplate) were also part of Lugh's panoply.

==== Gifts to the Fíana ====
(Crane-bag)

Manannán was also the owner of the "crane-bag" (Irish: corrbolg) full of treasures, according to the Middle-Irish Fenian lay "The Crane-Bag" (Duanaire Finn Poem VIII) datable to the 13th century, (Note: Duanaire Finn was copied by Aodh Ó Dochartaigh (O'Doherty) dated 12 February 1627.)

To Manannán was sent a woman transformed into the shape of a crane. She was Aoife, daughter of Dealbhaoth (Irish: Áiffe ingen Dealbhaoíth), and mistress of Ilbhreac of many beauties (Irish: Ilbric Iolchrothaigh). Ilbhreac here may have been Ilbhreac son of Manannán. (Note: Although he does not directly address Ilbhreac "of many beauties" of this crane-bag episode, George Lyman Kittredge remarks that Ilbhreac son of Manannán is mentioned in the Tóraigheacht Dhiarmada, and that his name meaning "the variously spotted one" is connected with shape-shifting. Ilbrec's nickname in the crane-bag lay is shared by the protagonist of the werewolf tale, Eachtra Iollainn iolchrothaigh. Kittredge also says another name mentioned alongside in the Tóraigheacht Dhiarmada Ábartach mac Alchaid Ioldathach (whose nickname means "of the Many-Colored Raiment"), also to be connected with shape-shifting. It is Iuchra daughter of Ábartach, the rival, who transforms Aoife into the crane. Ábartach also figures prominently in the Gilla Decair story (cf. infra).) Aoife was transformed by the druidery of her jealous love-rival (Iuchra daughter of Ábartach), whose spell was to last 200 years.

When Aoife died, Manannán crafted her crane's skin into a magical treasure bag, whose contents were only visible when flooded during full tide, and would seem empty when the tide had ebbed. The bag was in the possession of Lugh Lamhfada, then taken by Lugh's killers, the three sons of Cermait. Later Manannán endowed it to Conaire Mór the high king at Tara. The crane-bag was eventually owned by Cumhall mac Trénmhóir, as told at the outset of this lay.Macgnímartha Finn. This is assumed to be the "treasure-bag" that was lost to Cumhall's "servant-turned-traitor", Liath Luachra, who treacherously wounded Cumall in the Cath Cnucha, but recovered later by Cumhall's son, Finn when he grew up.

(Shield of Finn)

Manannán also commissioned the craftsman Lucra (recté Luchta) to make him a shield to be made of wood, and this later passed on to Finn, according to the lay (duan) "Shield of Fionn". The wood came from a withered hazel tree, on the fork which Lugh had set the severed head of Balor. The venom had penetrated this tree, killing or blinding workers trying uprooting or handling it. Various owners are named, such as Tadg mac Nuadat, but was given by Manannán to Crimall mac Trenmor, Finn's uncle, after the death of Finn's father.

==== Parallels ====
Manannán is furthermore identified with several trickster figures including the Gilla Decair and the Bodach an Chóta Lachtna ('the Churl in the Drab Coat').

The similarity of Manannan's inexhaustible swine to Odin's boar Sæhrímnir in Scandinavian myth has been noticed. Mannanán also owned a speckled cow that he and Aengus retrieved from India along with a dun cow, two golden goblets and two spancels of silk.

=== Familial relations ===
Manannán's father is the sea-god Ler ('Sea; Ocean'; Lir is the genitive form), whose role he seems to take over. As Oirbsen, his father is named as Elloth, son of Elatha. In the Altram Tige Dá Medar, Manannán calls himself the foster-son of the Dagda.

According to Táin Bó Cúailnge ('The Cattle-raid of Cooley'), his wife is the beautiful goddess Fand ('Pearl of Beauty' or 'A Tear' – later remembered as a "fairy queen", though earlier mentions point to her also being a sea deity). Other sources say his wife was the goddess Áine, though she is at other times said to be his daughter. Manannán had a daughter, whose name was Niamh of the Golden Hair. It is also probable that another daughter was Clíodhna, but early sources do not treat her consistently. Either way, she is a young woman from Manannán's lands, whose epithet is "of the Fair Hair". Manannán also had a yellow-haired daughter given also the name Curcog (meaning 'Beehive' or 'Bushy-tuft') who was given up to be fostered by Aengus.

Manannán is also given sons named Eachdond Mór (Note: Eachdonn the Great, son of Manannán.) and Gaidiar, who raped Becuma Cneisgel.

Another daughter of Manannán was said to be Saint Athrachta; according to oral legend, she tried to build a causeway across Lough Gara by carrying large stones in her petticoat but was prevented by modesty. In another legend of Athractha, she was said to live at the bottom of Lough Gara and only emerged every seven years to visit her sister Cé. Athractha cured a woman, and once a dragon with the roar of a lion emerged from the sludge and was vanquished by the Holy Virgin. There is also folklore that Cé (or Céibh) the daughter of Manannan lost her beauty and wits due to an incantation, but recovered her beauty after Oisín provided her hospices after others all shunned her.

In "The Voyage of Bran", Manannán prophesied to Bran that a great warrior would be descended from him. Thus Mongán mac Fiachnai becomes a late addition to the mac Lir family tree. The historical Mongán was a son of Fiachnae mac Báetáin, born towards the end of the 6th century. According to legend, Fiachnae came home with a victory from a war in what is today Scotland because of a bargain made with Manannán (either by him, or by his wife) to let Manannán have a child by his wife. This child, Mongán, was supposedly taken to the Otherworld when he was very young, to be raised there by Manannán. The 8th-century saga Compert Mongáin tells recounts the deeds of a legendary son, In the Dinsenchas, Manannán is also described as the father of Ibel, after whose death Manannán cast draughts of grief from his heart that became Loch Ruidi, Loch Cuan and Loch Dacaech.

Manannán is often seen in the traditional role of foster father, raising a number of foster children including Lugh of the great hand and the children of Deirdre.

Two brothers of Manannán are named, after whom cleared plains were named: Bron, who it is implied was slain by Fergus and Ceite. Similarly, in Welsh folklore Brân the Blessed is the brother of Manawydan.

== Folklore ==
=== County Monaghan ===
There are many oral folktales about conflicts between Manannán and St. Patrick in County Monaghan. In many of them Manannán invites St. Patrick to his castle for a feast; however, Patrick is warned by a butler or servant not to eat the food because it is poisoned. In retaliation for the crime, Patrick turns Manannán into a giant eel or salmon, and in some stories he is placed in a bottle and sent to the bottom of a lake to guard his iron treasure chest (or barrel) until the end of time. The treasure is chained to a team of white horses, and the chain can be seen at the top of the lake. In one story from County Monaghan, Manannán's castle was built with mortar from the blood of slaughtered animals, which allowed it to resist weathering for centuries. When the top of the castle toppled over, the bottom part sank into the ground, but the ruins could still be seen owing to the power of Manannán. In some stories, Manann was said to ride a flying white steed and could transform himself into a dove and could be heard crying every seven years.

In another story, Manann was a druid who challenged St. Patrick over whose god was more powerful. Manann covered the land in darkness, but St. Patrick placed his crozier in the ground, prayed to God and dispelled the darkness. At the spot where St. Patrick placed his crozier, a well called Tobar Lasar sprang from the ground.

In another story, villagers searching for Manann's treasure attempt to drain his lake, but just before they complete their task, a man on a white steed appears before them to send them on an errand. When they return a large rock is placed in the spot where they were digging, and no chisel or hammer can break it. In a variant of this story, all the men's horses are killed, and the work they had completed to dig the channel was filled with silt.

In another story, Manann was said to live in a castle and own a fabulous cow and calf that gave milk to everyone in the parish who wanted it. Some of the older people were jealous of the cow's abundance, and an old Protestant woman went to milk the cow into a sieve. When the cow saw what has happening, it was enraged and she and her calf ran to Dunany Point in County Louth, where they were turned to stone.

=== County Mayo ===
In County Mayo, a pot of treasure was supposed to be buried in Manann's wood, and this treasure was guarded by a serpent.

In a variant to the story about the formation of Lough Cullin and Lough Conn, Manann was said to have a huntsman named Cullen who had two hunting dogs. The dogs chased after a ferocious boar, and when they overtook the boar, the boar turned and killed the dogs in Lough Conn. Cullen was then drowned at Lough Cullin.

=== County Donegal ===
In a folktale from Donegal, St. Colum Cille broke his golden chalice and sent a servant to the mainland to have it repaired. While returning to the mainland in his currach, the servant met a stranger in a currach (later identified as Manannán), who blew his breath on the chalice, which then became whole again. Manannán then asked for a response from Colum Cille, who relayed that there would be no forgiveness for the man responsible for such works. When Manannán heard this, he said he would provide no more help to the Irish until they are "as weak as water", and then retired to the gray waves in the Highlands of Scotland. In a variant of this story, Manann was said to live in a castle near a lake, and at night, he would draw the lake around the castle like a moat, but each morning he would return the lake to its proper place. A boy gathering water from a well ran into Manann and accidentally broke his Delft pitcher. Manann offered to put the Dellft pitcher back together using witchcraft if the boy would ask Colum Cille what sort of people go to hell. Colum Cille told the boy that people such as Manann go to hell, and when he returned to report this to Manann, Manann was so enraged that he packed up his gold in a barrel and enchanted both the gold and himself. A diver from Dublin later went down into the lake and found Manann's barrel of gold with a monstrous serpent chained to it. Men from the village then tried to drain the lake, but the morning after drilling the drain, they found it all closed up with grass growing over it.

Manann was king of the faeries and coveted a beautiful meadow in Carndonagh owned by Neill na hAirde (in some versions another faery king). Manann bought the land from Neill with pearls from the ocean and built a beautiful castle there. Neill's wife grew jealous, and she compelled her husband to go to war over the castle. Neill's army was defeated Manann's, but in retribution, Neill (or in a variant, Manann) rode out to Bar Mouth; there he removed three enchanted rods that held back the ocean. The castle and land were subsequently submerged, but the gardens and castle can still be seen beneath the waves in Straghbregagh.

According to Donegal folklore, Manannán is said to be buried in the Tonn Banks off the coast of Inishowen, which form part of a Triad called the Three Waves of Erin. When Cú Chulainn struck his shield, the three waves of Erin echoed the sound and roared across the ocean. Manannán's spirit is believed to ride the storms that occur when ships are wrecked. The three legs of Manannán "paradoxically" make up the heraldic arms of Man and are said to represent the "storm-god careering over land and sea with whirling motion".

=== Merchant Orbsen ===
The 9th century Sanas Cormaic ('Cormac's Glossary') euhemerizes Manannán as "a famous merchant" of the Isle of Man and the best sailor in western Europe, who knew by "studying the heavens" when the weather would be good and bad. O'Donovan's annotation remarks that this merchant went by another name, Orbsen, son of Allot, and it is stated thus in Roderick O'Flaherty's Ogygia (1685).

However, the Yellow Book of Lecan (written c. 1400) separates these figures, stating there were four individuals called Manandán who lived at different times. They were: Manandán mac Alloit, a "druid of the Tuath Dé Danann" whose "proper name was Oirbsen"; Manandán mac Lir, a great sailor, merchant and druid; Manandán mac Cirp, king of the Isles and Mann; and Manandán mac Atgnai, who took in the sons of Uisnech and sailed to Ireland to avenge their deaths.

Tradition has it that Orbsen engaged in the Battle of Moycullen in Co. Galway, and fell on the brink of Lake Orbsen; the lake, named after him, is the present-day Lough Corrib. The conflict in which Manannan mac Alloid was slain by Ullinn was recorded in verse by 11th century poet Flann Mainistrech. There is a great stone pillar erected in the field of Moycullin, possibly marking the battle location. (Note: group-lower-alpha)

Oirbsen is also mentioned in the Lebor Gabala Erenn, where it gives his genealogy as follows: Galia s. Oirbsen s. Elloth s. Elada s. Delbaeth s. Net.

It goes on to state: "Orbsen was the name of Manannan at first, and from him is named Loch Orbsen in Connachta. When Manannan was being buried, it is then the lake burst over the land, [through the burial]."

=== O'Neill's Horse Race ===
There is a folk tale that an English horse racer challenges one of the O'Neills to a horse race. Manannán wants to defend the character of the Irish and knows that none of O'Neill's horses stands a chance against the Englishman's, so he appears in the form of a beggar and challenges the Englishman to a race that he himself runs from Shane's Castle to Dublin. By his enchantments, he wins the race and defends the pride of Ireland and the O'Neill clan. The tale bears some resemblance to the horse race of Macha and also the Roman tradition in which Neptune Equester oversaw horse races.

=== O'Donnell's Kern ===
In the story "O'Donnell's Kern", Manannan appears as a kern or serving man at the courts of various historical personages from 16th Century Ireland. As a kern, Manannan is repeatedly described as wearing thinly striped clothing and leather brogues (shoes) soaking with water, having ears and half his sword protruding from his mantle and carrying three scorched holly javelins (elsewhere described as a single javelin) in his right hand. In this guise, he again appears as a trickster, walking into his hosts' homes uninvited and undetected by the guardsmen.

At Black Hugh O'Donnell's home in Ballyshannon, Manannan challenges the court musicians to a competition, and with a harp plays music so sweetly melodious that it can put anyone to sleep – including the suffering and dying. O'Donnell declares he has never heard such beautiful music and offers the kern new clothing; the kern refuses O'Donnell's gift and also refuses to stay in his court (indicating he must go to Cnoc Aine the next day), so O'Donnell has his men surround the kern to prevent his departure. Manannan again plays music, but this time the strain causes O'Donnell's men to hack each other to pieces with axes. When he leaves O'Donnell, Manannan extracts a fine of twenty cattle and land, and in exchange, rubs a magic herb on the gums of O'Donnell's slaughtered men that revives them to life.

At the kern's next stop near Limerick, Shane Mac an Iarla invites the kern into his home, having heard of Manannan's reputation with reading and music, to which Manannan declares he is not impotent. However, when Shane brings the kern an instrument and a book, the kern is unable to read or play until Shane lampoons him. When Shane asks Manannan whether he has visited Desmond before, he declares that he was there with the Fianna, several millennia earlier.

Next, the kern travels to Leinster to visit MacEochaidh, who is incapacitated with a broken leg and blood poisoning. When asked about his art, the kern declares that he is a healer and tells MacEochaidh that if he will put his stingy, churlish behavior past him he would be healed. Manannan then dresses MacEochaidh's leg with a healing herb, who immediately recovers from his affliction. MacEochaidh then throws a feast for Manannan and offers him his buxom daughter along with three hundred each of cattle, horses, sheep and hogs. Before he can receive his reward, however, the kern flees MacEochaidh's house to his next destination.

He goes to Sligo where he encounters O'Conner, who is about to make war with Munster. After some ridicule from O'Conner's men, the kern offers his military services to O'Conner if he agrees that nothing unfair will be done to the kern. O'Conner's men engage in cattle raiding, and when the men of Munster attempt to steal them back, Manannan kills them with a bow and 24 arrows. He then drives all the cattle across the Shannon and back to O'Conner in Sligo. At a feast to celebrate the victory, O'Conner slights Manannan by drinking the first toast without a thought to the kern, so Manannan recites some verses indicating his displeasure and then vanishes from the company.

Then, the kern goes to Teigue O'Kelly's home and describes his art as conjuring. He bluffs O'Kelly with two spurious tricks (wagging an ear and making a reed disappear), then from a bag conjures a thread that he throws into the air and fixes to a cloud, a hare, a beagle and a dog boy. From another bag he pulls a woman, and all the characters go running up the thread into the clouds. The kern remarks that something bad will happen, such as the boy ending up with the woman and the dog eating the hare. When Manannán reels in his thread, this is indeed, exactly what the men discover has happened, and he, in anger, beheads the dogboy. At the king's behest, the kern replaces the dog boy's head backward, but after O'Kelly's complaints, turns it back to the right side.

Finally, the kern visits the King of Leinster, whose musicians he declares sound worse than the sledgehammer's thunder in the lowest regions of hell. The King's musicians and men then jump the kern, but each blow they make on the kern inflicts the same wound on themselves. In retaliation, the King has the kern taken out 3 times to the gallows to be hanged, but each time, they find in the kern's place one of the king's confidants at the end of the rope. The following day at sunrise, the kern returns to the king's castle and offers to heal all the men who were killed the previous day, which he revives with a healing herb.

It is only at the end of the tale that the kern is revealed as Manannan, who is offered a dish of crabapples and bonnyclabber at Shane O'Donnellan's house in Meath. As the kern, Manannan repeatedly calls himself sweet one day and bitter or sour the next and describes himself as a stroller or traveler who was born in "Ellach of the kings". He also gives the following names for himself "Duartaine O'Duartaine", "Cathal O'Cein", "Gilla de" and "Gilla Decair" during his travels. O'Donnell's Kern is an example of the folk memory of the Irish gods long after Christianization.

=== The Pursuit of the Gilla Decair and His Horse ===
As the Gilla Decair, a name also referenced in "O'Donnell's Kern", Manannán appears in the Fenian story "The Pursuit of the Gilla Decair and his Horse". In this tale the Fianna encounter the Gilla on Samhain while pursuing the hunt through the forests of Ballachgowan in Munster. The Gilla is described as a gigantic, virile ruffian with black limbs, devilish, misshapen and ugly, leading a gaunt horse with grey hindquarters and thin legs with an iron chain. Additionally, the Gilla is dressed as a warrior with a convex, black shield hanging from his back, a wide grooved sword at his left thigh, two long javelins at his shoulder and a limp mantle about him, all reminiscent of Manannan's description in "O'Donnell's Kern". After greeting Finn with a lay that begins, "May the gods bless thee, Finn, O man of affable discourse ...", the Gilla tells Finn that he is a Fomorian who visits the kings of Christendom to earn a wage, and that his name was given because of the great personal sacrifices he makes on behalf of his retainers. The Gilla then asks Finn if he will hire him as a horseman, to which Finn assents, and then asks to release his horse to graze with those of the Fianna. When Finn grants his permission, the Gilla unbridles his horse to graze with the others and proceeds to mutilate and kill all the horses of the Fianna.

After seeking the Fianna's counsel, Finn tells Conán mac Morna to mount the Gilla's horse and ride him to death, but though he tries violently to make the horse move, he won't budge. Thirteen other Fianna then mount the horse in an attempt to weigh the horse down as much as the Gilla, but still the horse refuses to budge. The Gilla then tells Finn and the Fianna that were he to serve the rest of his term under Finn's contemptuous frivolity, he would be pitied and mocked, so he tells them that he will be parting and leaves the Fianna with such a fierce, thundering rapidity that it is compared to the speed of a swallow and noise of a March wind over a mountain. As soon as the Gilla's horse loses sight of his master, he speeds off after him with fourteen of the Fianna on his back. Finn and the remaining Fianna then track the Gilla and his horse until they arrive at the sea, where another of the Fianna grabs the horse's tail as it alights over the water with the fifteen men.

Finn then travels to Ben-Adar, where the Tuatha Dé Danann promised the children of the Gael that should they ever need to leave Ireland, they would encounter a ship outfit for them. As the Fianna approach the sea, Finn encounters a pair of men, described as "bulkiest of heroes, most powerful of fighting men, hardiest of champions". Both men bear shields with lions, leopards and griffins, "terrible" swords, crimson cloaks with gold fibulae, gold sandals and gold bands on their heads. They bow to Finn and tell him they are the sons of the King of India, who have the ability to create ships with three fells of the axe and can carry the ships over land and sea. One of the brothers tells Finn that his name is Feradach.

After three days on Feradach's ships without seeing any land or coastline, the Fianna reach a craggy island where they spot the Gilla's tracks. Here it is determined that Diarmuid, who was fostered by Manannan and Aengus Og, is shamed into vaulting onto the island using the javelins of Manannan, which he possessed. Diarmuid leaves the Fianna behind and ventures a beautiful forested land, filled with buzzing bees and birds. In the midst of the forested plain, Diarmuid beholds a massive tree with interlacing branches, beneath which is a well of pure water with an ornamented drinking horn suspended above it. Diarmuid lusts after the water in the well, pursues it and is confronted with a loud rumbling noise indicating that none should drink of its waters. Diarmuid drinks the water, and a hostile wizard appears who upbraids Diarmuid for roaming his forests and drinking his water. Diarmuid and the wizard battle each other, and the wizard jumps into the well, leaving Diarmuid behind. Diarmuid then kills a stag with his javelin, cooks it, and falls asleep. The next day, he finds the wizard and the two continue their fight for three days with the wizard jumping into his well at the end of each day. On the third day, Diarmuid follows the wizard into the well and finds upon his emergence, a wide open flowery plain with a regal city. He follows the wizard into the city where he fights the host until he is bleeding, injured, and on the ground. When Diarmuid awakens, a burly wizard kicks him in the back and explains that he is not there to do Diarmuid harm but to explain that he is in a dangerous place of enemies. The wizard then takes Diarmuid on a long journey to a towering fortress, where his wounds are healed with herbs, and he is taken to feasting with the wizard's men.

When Diarmuid asks where he is and whom he is, the wizard tells him he is in Tir fo Thuinn, that he is the Wizard of Chivalry who is an enemy of the Wizard of the Well, with whom Diarmuid had fought, and that he was hired o work under Finn for a year. While Diarmuid is detained with the Wizard of Chivalry, Finn and the Fianna craft rope ladders and also scale the cliffs onto the island. There they encounter a king on horseback who takes them to his kingdom where they enjoy feasting. The Fianna wage war with the king against the King of Greece, who is attempting to invade the island. After winning the war, there is a great celebration with the kings of other lands, and there Finn is reunited with Diarmuid. Diarmuid explains that the Gilla's true name is Abartach son of Allchad, and he lives in the Land of Promise.

The daughter of the King of Greece promised herself to Finn prior to the King's defeat, so the Fianna split into groups again, one to pursue Abartach, and the other to Greece. The Fianna retrieve the King of Greece's daughter Taise for Finn, and return to the Land of Promise. There they reunite with Finn, who has found Abartach. Abartach challenges Finn to determine what debt is owed for the long journeys, adventures and victories of the Fianna, to which Conan demands payment in the form of fourteen women from the Land of Promise along with Abartach's own wife, who are to ride on his horse, as the Fianna had, back to Ireland. Abartach agrees to the terms, vanishes before the Fianna and the company returns to Ireland.

Although none of the characters in the story are explicitly called Manannan, the setting of the tale in Tir fo Thuinn, the use of the name Gilla Decair, which is explicitly one of Manannan's bynames in O'Donnell's Kern, and the description of the Gilla's behavior all clearly point to his being the central character on the island. Additionally, the name Abartach is used in the context of Manannan's family as the right-hand man of Manannan's son Eachdond Mor. In the Book of Lecan Abartach and Manannan are listed together as two celebrated chiefs of the Tuatha De known for being, respectively, a great musician and a great navigator. Elsewhere Abartach, whose name means dwarf, and who also goes by the name Averty, was a magician of dwarfish size that terrorized part of Ireland. Abartach was only vulnerable in one part of his body, and Fionn mac Cumhaill was able to slay him by sticking his thumb into his mouth to determine the vulnerable spot before spearing him. Abartach was then buried upside down in his grave to prevent his rising from the dead.

== In Manx mythology ==
=== Manx folklore ===
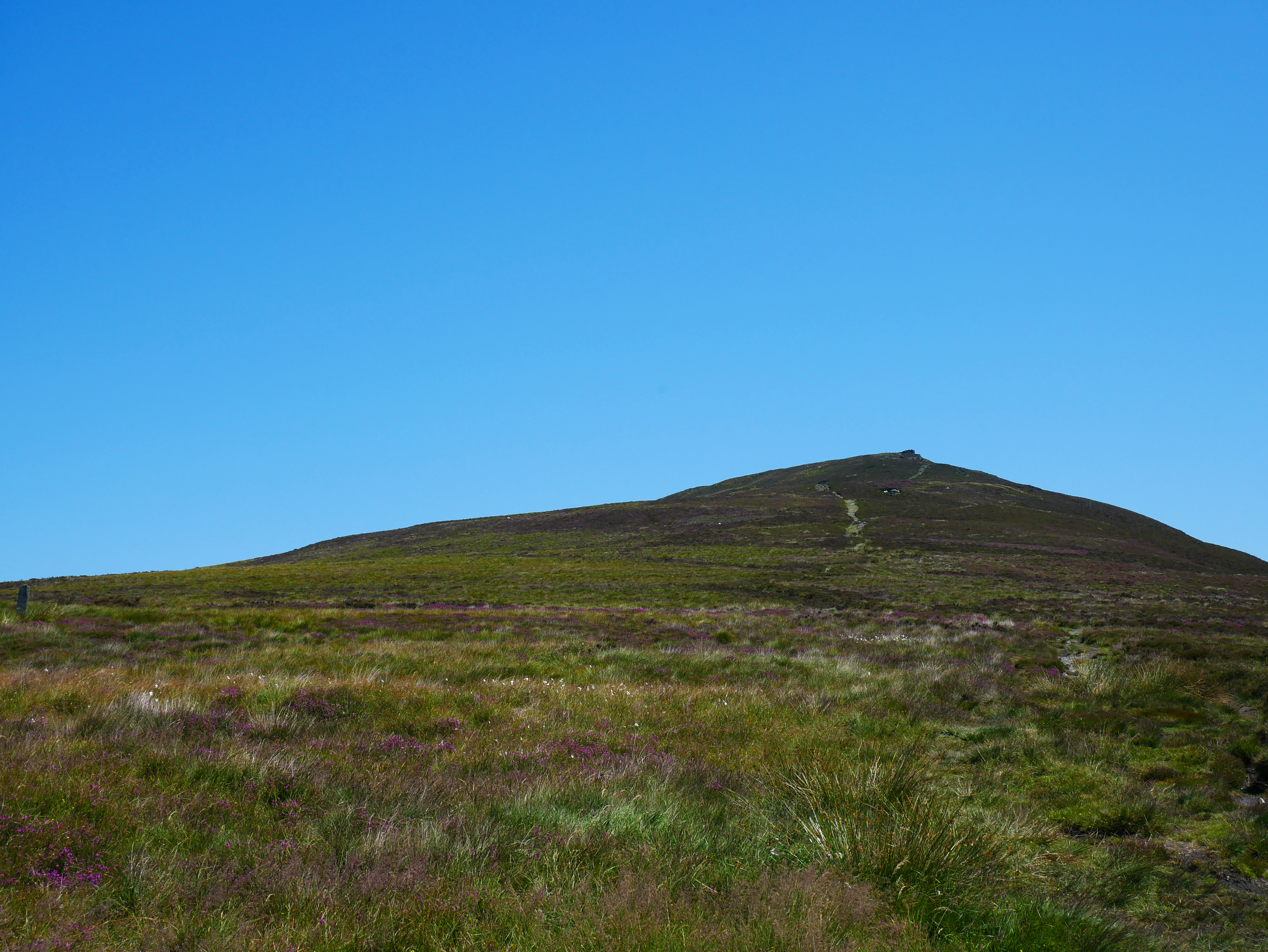
South Barrule, reputed home of Manannán on the Isle of Man

According to the local lore of the Isle of Man, Manannán was the island's first ruler.

First ruler

A document called the "Supposed True Chronicle of Man" (16th century) asserts that Manannan was the first "ruler of Mann", was "as paynim (pagan), and kept, by necromancy, the Land of Man under mists", and imposed as tax a bundle of green rushes, which was due every Midsummer Eve at a place called Warfield (the present-day South Barrule). More or less the same thing is stated in verse within "The Traditionary Ballad" aka "Manannan beg va Mac y Leirr" (1504), whose third quatrain ran: (Note: A. W. Moore edited and gave a different translation to 6 strophes relevant to Manannan. Sophia Morrison reprinted Moore's translation as old ballad.)

Manannan beg va Mac y Leirr
Shen yn chied er ec row rieau ee
Agh myr share oddym's cur-my-ner
Cha row eh hene agh An-chreestee

— Anonymous (1504). Train, Joseph ed. tr. (1864)
Translation:

Little Manannan was a son of Leirr;
he was the first that ever had it [the island];
but as I can best conceive,
he was himself a heathen.

— Translated by Joseph Train (1854), as modified with annotation in the Dublin Review (1865)

The poem thus identified the king of the island as one Manannan-beg-mac-y-Lheirr, 'little Manannan, son of the Sea' (or, 'son of Leir'). Manannan was later banished by Saint Patrick according to the poem. (Note: Sophia Morrison also prints a prayer invoking Manannan Beg that was known to her. W. Y. Evans-Wentz remarked this prayer was a product of substituting St. Patrick's name with Manannan's.)

As to the Manx offering rushes to Manannán, there is evidence these wild plants—which typically grow in wetlands—were sacred to him.

Illusory magic

According to tradition, Manannan once held Peel Castle and caused a single man guarding its battlements to appear as a force of a thousand, thus succeeding in driving out his enemies. Manx storyteller Sophia Morrison repeats this story except reducing the amplification to hundredfold men and referring to the rampart "a great stone fort on Peel Island". She also appends a story that Manannan once crafted makeshift boats out of sedges, creating an illusion of a larger fleet, causing the Viking invaders to flee in terror from the bay of Peel Island.

== Toponymy ==
There are places named after Manannán in Ireland, the Isle of Man and Scotland. In Ireland, most of them are on the coast or contain water features. They include Mannin Lake (Loch Mhanainn) in County Mayo, Mannin Bay (Cuan Mhanainn) in County Galway, Mannin Island (Manainn) in County Cork, Cashelmanannan (Caiseal Mhanannáin, 'Manannán's Ringfort') and Sheevannan (Sí Mhanannáin, 'Manannán's Fairy-mound') in County Roscommon, Derrymannin (Doire Mhanainn, 'Manann's Oak') in County Mayo, and Carrickmannon (Carraig Mhanainn, 'Manannán's Rock') in County Down. Also in Ireland, Lough Corrib takes its name from Manannán's alternate name Oirbsiu or Oirbsen. The placenames Clackmannan (Clach Mhanainn) and Slamannan (Sliabh Mhanainn) in Scotland may also refer to Manannàn.

== See also ==
- Manawydan fab Llŷr
- Irish mythology in popular culture: Manannán mac Lir
- Charon – Ferryman of the dead from Greek mythology.
- Fisher King

== Bibliography ==
- Arbois de Jubainville, Henri d' (1892). "Cúchulainn malade et alité; grande jalousie d'Émer". L'épopée celtique en Irlande [Serglige Con Culainn]. Vol. 1. Paris: E. Thorin. pp. 170–216.
- Arbois de Jubainville, Henry d' (1903). The Irish Mythological Cycle and Celtic Mythology. Translated by Best, R. I. Dublin: Hodges, Figgs & Co.
- Borlase, William Copeland (1897). The Dolmens of Ireland. Chapman & Hall.
- Brown, Arthur C. L. (1910). "The Bleeding Lance". Publications of the Modern Language Association. 25 (1): 1–59. doi:10.2307/456810. hdl:2027/mdp.39015014539368. JSTOR 456810. S2CID 163517936.
- Bruford, Alan (1966). "Gaelic Folk-tales and Mediæval Romances: A Study of the Early Modern Irish 'Romantic Tales' and Their Oral Derivatives". Béaloideas. 34: i–v, 1–165, 167–285. doi:10.2307/20521320. JSTOR 20521320.
- MacQuarrie, Charles W. (2004). The Biography of the Irish God of the Sea from 'The Voyage of Bran' (700 A.D.) to 'Finnegan's Wake' (1939): The Waves of Manannán. "Studies in Irish Literature" ser. Vol. 13. Lampeter, Wales: Edwin Mellen Press. ISBN 9780773463820. Excerpts, edited and illustrated for children, were reprinted under the title: Waves of Manannan mac Lir: The Irish God of the Sea. Lily Publications. 2013. ISBN 9781907945298. OCLC 925504286. The 471-page original book should not be confused with the 59-page children's book.
- MacNeill, Eoin (1908). Duanaire Finn: The Book of the Lays of Fionn. pt. 1. ITS 7. David Nutt, for Irish Texts Society.
- Moore, A. W. (1891). Folk-lore of the Isle of Man. Douglas, Isle of Man: Brown & Son.
- Moore, A. W. (1895). "Further Notes on Manx Folklore". The Antiquary. 31: 38–43.
- Murphy, Gerard (1953). Duanaire Finn: The book of the Lays of Fionn. pt. 3. ITS 43. index by Anna O'Sullivan. David Nutt, for Irish Texts Society.
- O'Curry, Eugene (1863). "The Fate of the Children of Tuireann ([A]oidhe Chloinne Tuireann)". Atlantis. IV: 157–240.
- O'Duffy, Richard J., ed. (1888). Oidhe Chloinne Tuireann: Fate of the Children of Tuireann. M. H. Gill & Son, for Society for the Preservation of the Irish Language. A second edition was produced from the same publisher in 1901, but some of the earlier edition's notes about the manuscript materials were omitted.
- Spaan, David B. (Autumn 1965). "The Place of Manannan Mac Lir in Irish Mythology". Folklore. 76 (3): 176–195. doi:10.1080/0015587X.1965.9717007. JSTOR 1258585.
