= Echtra Cormaic =

Irish mythic tale

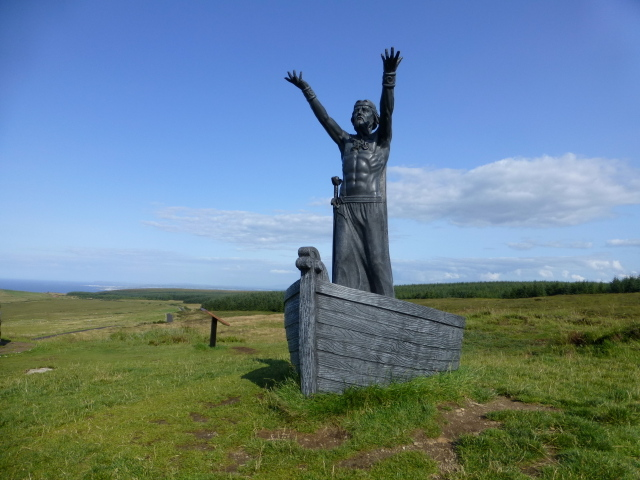
Manannán mac Lir sculpture by John Sutton at Gortmore, Magilligan, County Londonderry (2014).

Echtra Cormaic or Echtra Cormaic i Tir Tairngiri (Cormac's Adventure in the Land of Promise) is a tale in Irish mythology which recounts the journey of the high-king Cormac mac Airt to the Land of Promise resided by the sea-god Manannán mac Lir.

== Texts ==
The tale bears the full manuscript title "(Scel na Fir Flatha,) Echtra Cormaic i Tir Tairngiri ocus Ceart Claidib Cormaic in the text edited by Whitley Stokes, translated as "The Tale of the Ordeals, Cormac’s Adventure in the Land of Promise, and the Decision as to Cormac’s Sword". This edition uses the Book of Ballymote as base text, with readings from the Yellow Book of Lecan. The two texts exhibit only minor differences, and are together classed as the first recension, whose composition 1150–1200 on linguistic evidence, based on some earlier exemplar which is thought to have existed.

A second recension of the Echtra is found in the Book of Fermoy, edited and translated by Vernam Hall. Eugene O'Curry also translated an excerpt from it.

The story is also known as Fagháil Chraoibhe Cormaic, and has been edited by Standish H. O'Grady, and translated as "How Cormac mac Airt Got his Branch". This belongs in the third recension, in late Middle Irish. The manuscript used by O'Grady is unknown, but there are altogether 9 other paper MSS. in existence, none earlier than 1699.

O'Grady's translation was condensed and reprinted in one of Joseph Jacobs's anthologies. The chapter "His Three Calls to Cormac" is a retelling of the narrative by Lady Augusta Gregory in her book, Gods and Fighting Men.

== Summary ==
High King Cormac mac Airt meets a mysterious stranger at the Hill of Tara who bears a magical Silver Branch with three golden apples, which sends anyone to sleep if they hear its magic music. He takes the branch in exchange for three wishes of the stranger in exchange for three wishes to be redeemed at a later point in time. A year later, the stranger asks Cormac first for his daughter, then his son, and then his wife Eithne. Enraged, Cormac pursues the stranger across the countryside until he is lost in a magical fog. When the fog subsides, Cormac finds himself in a castle ruled by another stranger, who serves Cormac a pig which cannot be roasted until a true story is told for each of its quarters. Cormac relates how his wife and children were taken from him, allowing the pig to be fully roasted. When the meat is served, Cormac complains that he only dines in the company of fifty men; at this point the host recites a magical lullaby which puts Cormac to sleep.

When Cormac awakes, he finds himself in the company of fifty warriors, his wife, and his children. The host reveals himself to Manannán mac Lir, god of the sea and the true form of the stranger with the Silver Branch, who placed these trials for Cormac so that he may travel to his kingdom Tir na nÓg. He allows Cormac to return to Ireland with his family, the Silver Branch, and a magical cup which breaks if it detects a lie and reforms if it hears the truth, but warns Cormac that the treasures may only be his for his lifetime. After Cormac's death, the two artefacts are never again seen in Ireland.
