= Mythology of the Caucasus =

Mythology of the Caucasus is the mythologies and folklore of the various peoples of the Caucasus region.

Examples include:

- North Caucasus:
  - Nart saga
  - Ossetian mythology
  - Vainakh mythology, covers Chechen and Ingush mythology
- Southern Caucasus/Transcaucasia:
  - Georgian mythology
  - Armenian mythology
  - Azerbaijani mythology
