= Dragonstone =

Dragonstone may also refer to:

- dracontia - a precious stone reputed to be found in serpents, according to classical writers
- Dragonstone (A Song of Ice and Fire), a fictional fortress and island
- "Dragonstone" (Game of Thrones), an episode of the seventh season of Game of Thrones
- Dragonstone Software, developer of the 2002 video game Dragon's Lair 3D: Return to the Lair
- Dragon Stone of Dash Kasan Caves, a fourteenth-century temple in Iran
- Dragonstone (video game), 1994 role-playing video game
- Drakenstein (archaic Dutch for dragonstone), a range of mountains in the Western Cape province of South Africa
- The Dragonstone, a 1996 novel in the Mithras series by Dennis L. McKiernan
