= Emain Ablach =

Mythical island in Irish mythology

Emain Ablach (also Emne; Middle Irish Emhain Abhlach or Eamhna; meaning "Emhain of the Apples") is a mythical island paradise in Irish mythology. It is often regarded as the realm of the sea god Manannán Mac Lir and identified with either the Isle of Man or, less plausibly, the Isle of Arran. According to the medieval Irish poem Baile Suthain Sith Eamhna, the god Lug Lamfada was reared in Emain Ablach. In another poem from the 14th century, Emain Ablach is described as being filled with swans and yews.

== Etymology ==
"Emain/Emne" is of uncertain etymology, though it may be compared with the place name Emain Macha in Ireland, recorded as "Isamnion" in Ptolemy's 2nd-century AD Geography, which Celticist Heinrich Wagner would translate as "what is moving by itself rapidly, the stream", derived from the Proto-Indo-European root *eis- "to move rapidly". "Ablach" means "of the apples/fruits" in Old Irish.

== Influence ==
In medieval Arthurian literature, Geoffrey of Monmouth's island paradise Insula Avallonis (Avalon), where the sword Caliburnus (Excalibur) was forged, and where King Arthur was taken to be healed by the sorceress Morgen and her eight sisters after the Battle of Camlann, could have been influenced by Irish legends of Emain Ablach. The medieval Welsh equivalent of Avalon, Ynys Afallach ("Isle of Afallach"), may also be related to – if not derived from – Emain Ablach.

== Bibliography ==
- Bullock-Davies, Constance, "Lanval and Avalon," Bulletin of the Board of Celtic Studies 23, 1969, p. 128-42.
- Koch, John (ed.), Celtic Culture: A Historical Encyclopedia, ABC-CLIO, 2006, p. 146-147; p. 677; p. 691; p. 959; p. 1244; p. 1471; p. 1671.
- MacNeill, Máire, The festival of Lughnasa Comhair de Bhéaloideas Éireann, University College, 1982, p. 6.
- Maier, Bernhard (ed.), Dictionary of Celtic religion and culture, Boydell & Brewer, 1997, p. 3; p. 156;, p. 186.
- Ó hÓgáin, Dáithí, Myth, legend & romance: an encyclopaedia of the Irish folk tradition, Prentice Hall Press, 1991, p. 247.
- Skene, William Forbes, Celtic Scotland: a history of ancient Alban, Volume 3, Edmonston & Douglas, 1880, p. 410ff.
- Wagner, Heinrich, "The archaic Dind Ríg poem and related problems", Ériu, Vol. 28, 1977, p. 1-16.
