= Book of Fermoy =

Medieval Irish text dated to the 14th to 16th century AD

- Royal Irish Academy
- Also known as: Leabhar Fhear Maí, Book of Roche
- Date: 14th–16th century
- Place of origin: Ireland
- Language(s): Middle Irish, Early Modern Irish
- Scribe(s): Domhnall Ó Leighin, Uilliam Ó hIcedha, Dáibith Ó Duib, Torna Uí Mhaoil Chonaire
- Material: Vellum
- Size: 34.5cm x 26cm
- Format: Folio
- Script: coarse bookhand (pp 1-16) small neat upright hand (pp 147-51) cursive hand (pp 217-24)

The Book of Fermoy (Irish: Leabhar Fhear Maí, aka RIA MS 23 E 29 or the Book of Roche, leabhar de Róiste) is a medieval Irish text dated to the 14th to 16th century AD. The majority of the book consists of a compendium of poems, historical tracts and genealogies related to the medieval Roche family compiled in the 1450s and 1460s.

== History ==
The book was written in the Irish language in the fifteenth century by several scribes. The 238 pages contain numerous tales, histories, and biographies. James Henthorn Todd acquired the work in 1858 – he suggested the title "Book of Roche" would be equally applicable to the work on account of the large quantity of content relating to the history of the Roche family of Fermoy; one "David [Mór] son of Maurice son of John Roche" is mentioned in the text as a patron of one set of scribes.

== Contents ==
Summary based on Todd (1868). Folio numbering follows Eugene O'Curry's added pagination as in Todd. (a/b refer to each side of the page)

| Folio | Title or incipit | Content notes |
|---|---|---|
| 1-8 | Leabhar Gabhála | Part of the Leabhar Gabhála including the biblical beginnings to the history of Partholon and Nemed |
| 9-23 | "Book of Fermoy" (according to Todd (1868)) | Numbered from p. 22, suggesting loss of earlier content. Contents include "Legend of Mór Mumham", including "Elopement of Ruithcearna with Cuana mac Cailcin" |
| 24 | Bai Fingen mac Lucta aidchi Samna i nDruim Fingin | Story of fifty wonders witnessed when Conn of the Hundred Battles was born, as related to Fingen mac Luchta King of Munster |
| 25 | Cia so agras coir um Cruachain | Poem on the right of sovereignty of Connaught |
| 26 | Mor loites lucht an indluig | Poem "Much do slandering people destroy" |
| 27 | Baile suthach Sith Emhna | "The fairy hill of Sith Emhna", written in praise of Raghnall mac Gofraidh, King of the Isles |
| 28 | Gerr o dob inghill mna Mumhan | Thought to be an elegy to Siubhan daughter of Cormac Mac Carthy |
| 29-31 | Incipit Cath Crinda | "Here begins the battle of Criman" - relating to the rise of Cormac mac Airt as a king of Ireland |
| 32 | Bruíden Meic dareo annso sísana | "The court of the son of Daire" Rebellion of the Athech-Tuatha against the Milesians |
| 33a | Aní diaroibe in Ces for Ultaibh só sis | Account of the origin of the debility of the Ultonians |
| 33b | Cinaeth O'Hartigan cecinit | Poem describing the death and burials of the seven sons of Aedh Slaine (Áed Sláine) |
| 33b | Fothad na Canoine cecinit | Poem to Aedh Oirnighe on becoming King of Ireland 793 |
| 34b | Indarba Mochuda ar Raithin | Account of the banishment of St. Mochuda from Raithin |
| 38-42 | Betha Sain Seoirsí | Life of Saint George |
| 42b-43 | Scēl Saltrach na Muice | Story of the Pigs |
| 44-48 | | Destruction of Jerusalem under Vespasian and Titus |
| 48b | | Indescipherable poem |
| 49-50 | Tochmarc Treblainne | The courtship of Treblainn, daughter of Cairbre Niafar, King of Leinster, by Froech, son of Fidach, of the Firbolgs |
| 51 | | Tale of Cairbre Crom, King of Hy Maine, Connaught, his murder, and restoration by St. Ciaran of Clonnmacnois |
| 51b-55 | | Biography of Conn of the Hundred Battles |
| 56 | | Eulogy poem to David Mac Muiris Roche, Lord of Fermoy |
| 57a | Aroile duine truagh bocht | Tale of a poor man and King David |
| 57a | Ceitre hairdi an domain; toir, tiar, ter, tuaigh | Account of four people (corresponding to the points of a compass) who lived through the deluge |
| 57a | Dá mac amhra.. | Legend relating to King David |
| 57a-58a | Bo bí aroile urraíghi | Life and Martyrdom of St. Juliana |
| 58a | Tuaruscbail Iudáis Scairioth | Account of Judas Iscariot; relating to a legend of St. Brendan |
| 58b | Mearugud Clereach Coluimcille | Account of the journeys of two of St. Columcille's clerics |
| 59b | Beatha Bairre Corcaídhe annso sís | "The Life of Barre of Cork" |
| 60a-61b | Beata Molaga | Life of Saint Molaga |
| 61b | Ectra Cormaic macAirt | Adventures of Cormaic macAirt |
| 62b | Acso ant adhbhar fanabar Domnach Crom Dubh | Tale on origin of the name Crom Dubh Sunday |
| 63-72a | | Account of the life of Christ, and acts of successive Roman emperors to the destruction of the Temple under Titus |
| 72a | Aroile oglach do bí in abdaine Drumanaigh | Fool story |
| 72b-73a | Da bron flatha nime.. | Story of the biblical Elias and Enoch |
| 73a | | Extracts from the life of St. Ambrose |
| 73b | | blank |
| 74-74b | Gabum dechmadh ar ndana | 13th C.religious poem by Donnchadh Mór O'Daly, abbot of Boyle (incomplete) |
| 75a | Garb eirge idhna bhratha | Judgement day poem by Donnchadh Mór O'Daly |
| 75a | O Mhuire, a mathair ar nathar | Poem to the Virgin Mary |
| 76b | Mianna Cormaic mic Airt | Poem "The Desires of Cormac Mac Airt" |
| 76b | Gearoid Iarla dochum na Fuatha bega sosiis | Poem attributed to Gerald, fourth Earl of Desmond (d.1397) |
| 77a | O mnaib ainmnighther Eri | "From women Eri is named" Pangyric to the wife of David son of Morris Roche, daughter of O'Brien |
| 77b | Eogan mac Conchobair hi Dalaighe | "Rogan, son of Conchobhair O'Dalaighe" Pangyric to the wife of David son of Morris Roche, daughter of O'Brien |
| 78 | Cerball mac Conchobhair i Dhalaige | "Cearbhall, son of Conchobhair, mac conchobair" Elegy to the wife of David son of Morris Roche, daughter of O'Brien |
| 79a | A tegh beg tiaghar a tegh mór | "From a small house people go to a big house". Pangyric on Diarmait O'Brien |
| 79b | Cath almhaine so | "The battle of Almhain here" (prose) |
| 80b | Longarad Coisfhind amuig Tuatha.. | Legend of Longarad of Disert-Longarad |
Some missing leaves
| 85a-88b | Feacht naen dandeachadh Fiachna Find mac Baedain meic Murcertaigh meic Muredhaigh | Life of the 6th C. Mongan, son of Fiachna, King of Ulidia. Version of the Echtrae Mongain maic Fiachna |
| 89a- | Feacht naen da roidhe conn .c. cathach mac Feidhlimigh rectmair mic Tuathail techtmair mic Feradaigh find fechtnaig.. | Tale of Conn of the Hundred Battles, his grief on death of Eithne Taebhfada, and the visitation of Becuma Cneisgel of the Tuatha de Danann (Version of Echtra Airt meic Cuind) |
| 92b | Maelmuire magrath .cc.. | Poem, panygric to Emma daughter of the Earl of Desmond (14th. C) |
| 93a-96 | | Poems, Pangyrics on David Roche of Fermoy |
| 96 | | List of land of the estate of the Roches of Fermoy (partly illegible) Schedule of rents |
| 97 | | missing |
| 98 | | Account of early colonists of Ireland, and of Tuan mac Cairill |
| 98b | Bliadain don cuaille co cert | Verses on the lifespans of men and animals, and on durations of tillage in fields |
| 99a | | (Loss of pages) Last page of the Tale of Lady Eithne |
| 99b | Fintan and the Hawk of Achill | |
| 100a | | End of (incomplete) poem. Characters include Cormac and Diarmid mag Carthaigh |
| 100a-103a | | 18 short poems. Possible school lessons or practice |
| 103a | Muircheartach O Floinn .cc. | Poem in praise of Mór and Johanna. daughters of Owen Mac Carthy |
| 103b | Eogan mac Aenguis dalaigh | Poem in praise of Johanna wife of David Roche of Fermoy |
| 104 | | More poems similar to those on folios 100-103 |
| 105a- | Imrumh churaigh ua corra | Version of The Voyage of the Uí Chorra |
| 109 | Righal nell noigiallaigh os clann Ethach, anso | "Inauguration of Niall of the Nine Hostages over the clann Eochaidh" |
| 110 | Cesta grega andso | "Greek questions here" |
| 111-116 | Altromh tighi da medar | Legend of Eithne, daughter of Dichu. The poems Dena damh a cana pen, Denum impodh inisnimhuch, Goirid mhe a muintir nimhe, and Cluittir libh fert fiail Ethne are inserted in the latter part of the tale. |
| 166b | Eoghan mor u daligh .cc. | Poem beginning "Teach me, O' Mary", partly illegible |
| 117a | | Poem on the crucifixion and passion of Christ |
| 117b-119a | Brian o huiginn | Poem. Pangyric on David son of Maurice Roche, contains a list of places he had plundered in Munster |
| 119a-120a | Seaan og mac rait .cc. | Poem in praise of the territory held by David son of Morris Roche, of Fermoy |
| 120a | OMaothagan .cc. | Poem in praise of Cathilin mother of David son of Morris Roche |
| 121a | Cormac mac Eoghain u Dalaig | Poem in praise of Cathilin, daughter of Tadgh Mac Carthy, mother of David son of Morris Roche |
| 121b | Ua Maethagan .cc. | Poem in praise of Morris, son of Morris Roche |
| 121b | | Note (in English) stating "The former pages of this Book, from the beginning to this page, was 288" |
| 122 | | Formerly black, now scribbled. Including notes by latter editors including William O'Hara (1805), and Eugene O'Curry (1858) |
| 123a | | Poem in praise of Cathilin, daughter of Tadhg Mac Carthy |
| 123b | Maithiar mór o cillin .cc. | Poem. Difficult to read |
| 124-126 | Tochmarc Emire | Fragments of the "Wooing of Emer" |
| 127 | | Page apparently not numbered by mistake by O'Curry |
| 128-129 | Druighean da Dearga | Version of the tale "Palace of Da-Dearga" (Togail Bruidne Dá Derga), concerning the death of Connaire Mór |
| Remainder | | The remainder of the work contains medical tracts, which Todd (1868) did not consider formed part of the "Book of Fermoy". A final fragment has the conclusion of a religious tract |
