= Saint Gobain (disambiguation) =

Saint Gobain may refer to:

- Saint Gobain (died 670), an Irish monk and martyr
- Saint-Gobain (Compagnie de Saint-Gobain S.A.), a French multinational construction material corporation
- Saint-Gobain, Aisne, a place in the Aisne department, France

== See also ==
- Saint Goban, Saint Gobban, or Saint Gobhan, the name of various saints of early Christian Ireland
- Gobán Saor, a smith or architect in Irish history and legend
- Saint Gobhan (Gobban find mac Lugdach, c. 560 – 639), associated with Seagoe in County Armagh
- Saint Govan (died 586), a Welsh hermit
