= Gobhan =

Irish saint

Saint Gobhan of Seagoe
- Gobban Find mac Lugdach
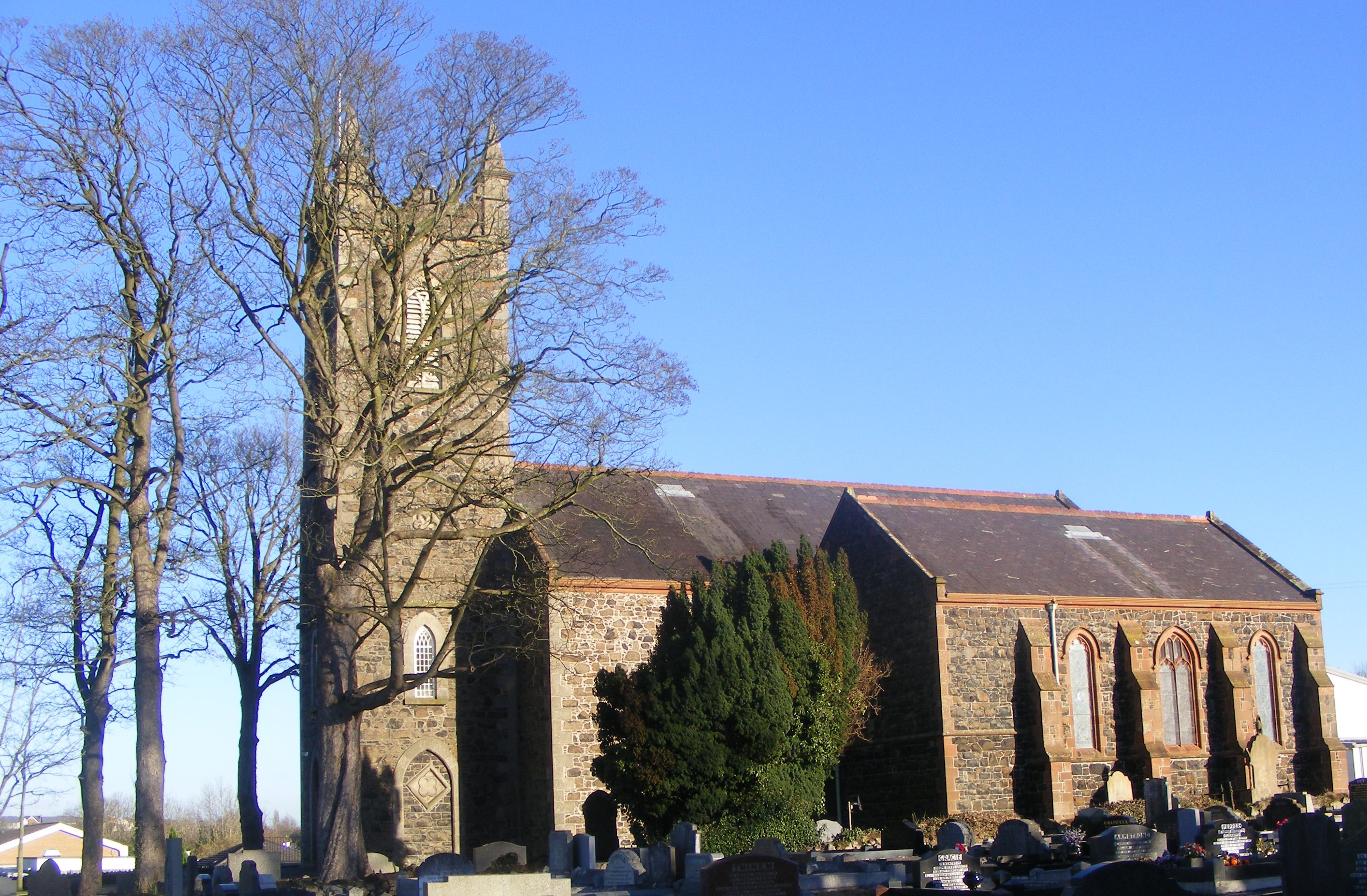
- Church of St Gobhan

Personal details
- Born: 6th century
- Died: 639
- Buried: Clonenagh/Laois or Clooneagh/Kerry

Sainthood
- Feast day: 6 December
- Venerated in: Anglican Communion, Catholic Church

Saint Gobhan has long been linked with the parish of Seagoe – recorded for instance as Teach dho-Ghobha – in County Armagh, Ireland.

Gobban find mac Lugdach (c. 560 – 639) was primarily known for his abbacy of the monastery of Oldleighlin, County Carlow, where in 633 an important synod was held to debate the timing of Easter. This monastery later evolved into St Laserian's Cathedral, Old Leighlin. This abbot also held authority at Killamery – Cell Lamraide in County Kilkenny. He died in 639 and was buried in either the ancient abbey of Clonenagh: Cluain-Ednech, County Laois or Clooneagh: Cluain Each, County Kerry.

== Saint Gobhan of Seagoe in Iveagh ==
Clans, landscapes and borders

A holy man named Saint Gobhan (Saint Goban-Gobban-Goba) is associated with the foundation in c. 600 of a church of Celtic Christianity origins in the parish of Seagoe, Portadown, County Armagh, Northern Ireland. The present St. Gobhan's church is in the post-Reformation Church of Ireland and is located within the Diocese of Down and Dromore, or alternatively the Roman Catholic Diocese of Dromore. The 17th-century Irish historian and hagiographer John Colgan wrote of this location: "Gobanus – Goba of Teg da-goba – Seagoe, on the bank of the Bann in Iveagh of Ulidia (also) St. Gobanus of Killamery, near the mountain called Slievenaman."

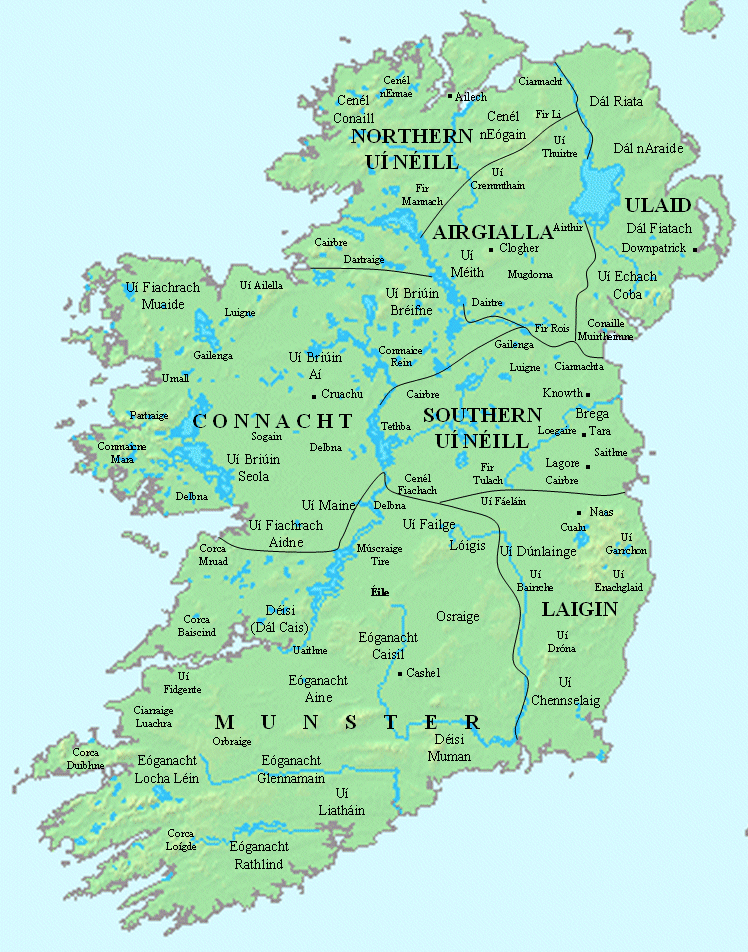
Ireland early peoples and politics

Situated four miles due south of Lough Neagh, St. Gobhan's church stands on a high-commanding ridge overlooking and to the east of the upper river Bann in a region where three counties almost meet – County Armagh, County Down and County Antrim. When Saint Gobhan first arrived in this locale almost one and a half thousand years ago he was in the lands of the Uí Echach Cobo whose territory would later become the baronies of Upper and Lower Iveagh, in modern-day County Down.

This boundary remained for many centuries until the Plantation of Ulster when in 1605 "The land east of the Upper Bann on the shore of Lough Neagh, known as Clanbrassilagh was formally annexed to the County of Ardmaghe...becoming eventually the barony of Oneilland East". The continuous spread of urban development and the re-designation of boundaries has masked or obliterated the ancient topography, allowing many small and independent hamlets to be swallowed up. Seagoe continued its independent existence until in 1888 the Local Government (Ireland) Act 1898 facilitated its inclusion into Portadown Urban District.

So, although present-day Seagoe by definition is in county Armagh, its location and ancient history display an affinity and tenuous bond of ecclesiastical ties with the lands within the historical diocese of Down and Dromore. The original foundation of St. Gobhan's church is in the ancient cemetery some one hundred yards distance from the present church. The old church ruins set amid tall yew trees and ornate headstones are a poignant reminder of many past incarnations.

== Gobban of Killamery ==
Whether political upheaval or ecclesiastical differences precipitated St. Gobban's departure from OldLeighlin is unclear. However, prior to the highly important synod of 633, it would appear that he left his monastery and along with numerous monks journeyed into the west of the kingdom of Ossory. Again whether or not he founded or inherited the monastery at Killamery:Cill lamraidhe in Ossory is disputed; however, during his abbacy, its fame and importance flourished. The 9th-century book – "The Martyrology of Oengus" states “of Gobban of Cell Lamraide in Hui Cathrenn in the west of Ossory, a thousand monks it had, as experts say and of them was Gobban.", The Killamery High Cross has become famous as part of the west Ossory group of High crosses.

== Gobban find mac Lugdach of Uí Ferba-Altraighe ==
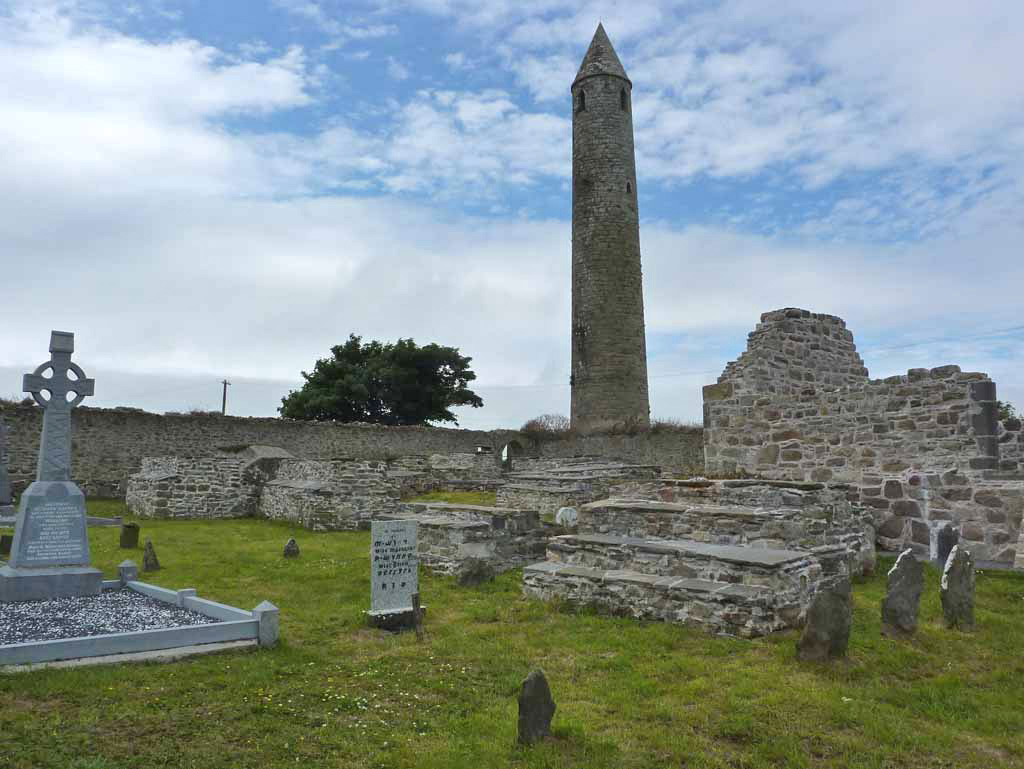
Rattoo round tower and church

In the southwest of Ireland, in the province of Munster, on the edge of the Atlantic Ocean, lies the "Kingdom" of County Kerry (Irish: Ciarraí). The kingdom of the Ciarraige tribe whose founder was Ciar, son of the legendary Fergus mac Róich of the Ulster Cycle in Irish mythology. A place where crumbling fortresses on jagged headlands still guard the memories of faded kingdoms.

In the "Martyrology of Oengus the culdee", (9th-century register of saints and their feast days), it is stated..."Of Gobban, i.e. of cell Lamraide in Hui Cathrenn in the west of Ossory, i.e. a thousand monks it had, as experts say. angelic wall, i.e. angels founded the wall of his church for him. Lane, an old tribe which was once in the south of Ireland, and of them was Gobban."

The tribal name of Lane is an interpretation of the Irish O'Laoghin or O'Laeghain as mentioned by Geoffrey Keating when referring to the Topographical Poems of Seán Mór Ó Dubhagáin and Giolla na Naomh Ó hUidhrín. where it is stated – "O'LAEGHAIN, O'Leyne, or Lane, chief of UI ferba and O'Duibhduin, chief of Ui Flannain, districts in the county of Kerry...O'Laeghain, a warrior of fame, We found him over Ui fearba; O'Cathnendaigh obtained the land, firmly settled under the high hills of cualan."

Some authorities describe the land of Ui Ferba as extending northwards from Tralee along Ballyheigue bay to Cashen Bay. However prior to its breakup during the Cambro-Norman invasion of Ireland, Ui Ferba not only included the forementioned lands but also included territory to the west of Tralee in the Dingle/Corkaguiny peninsular. Scattered and embedded into this primitive landscape of stone age dolmens and Iron Age forts are the very foundation stones of early Irish medieval ecclesiastical sites.

Many of these early Christian sites have been lost to the vagaries of time, man, and nature. However many still exist to some extent: one of which is the ancient ecclesiastic site of Rattoo, with its famous round tower.

The estate of the Abbey and churches of Rattoo arose within the ancient ecclesiastical see of Ardfert in the cantred of Altry bordering Ui Ferba, within the over kingdom of Ciarraige Luachra and was founded by – "the gentle bishop Lugdach". This ecclesiastical site, which was reported to consist of seven churches was long known as "Rath Muighe tuaiscirt" – the fort of the northern plain. This bishop Lugdach, could be the father of Gobban find mac Lugdach and this ecclesiastical enclosure might not only be St. Gobhan's birthplace: but also that of his real final resting abode.

It is generally considered that St. Gobhan was buried, or his holy relics preserved, at the monastery of St. Fintan of Clonenagh(Cluain Ednech), county Laois. However St. Gobhan had no apparent ecclesiastical ties to this historic establishment. An examination of the etymology of Cluain Eidhneach is instructive. The meaning of the Middle Irish word Cluain is invariably found to be a piece of fertile land surrounded by a bog or moor, or on one side by a bog, and the other by water. Also the word eidnech/eidhneach refers to an area of ivy-clad trees. In summary, an area of raised fertile land surrounded by bog or swamp.

A few miles to the north of Ratoo the rivers Feale, Brick and Gale converge: thus united they become the Cashen river which flows some six more miles before emptying into Cashen Bay on the River Shannon estuary. The low ground south of the Cashen river was known as Cashen bog. The church of Rattoo lies within this bog, which is now much reduced: however, one and a half thousand years ago this topography would have been more apparent.

The church of Rattoo adjoins the ancient townland of Clooneagh:Cluain Each. – while seven miles west of Tralee, on the Corkaguiny peninsular is the old church of Kilgobbin.

== St Gobban and St Scuithin ==
St. Gobban founded his monastery at OldLeighlin in 616. The boundary lines of counties Carlow, Laois and Kilkenny all meet on the Castlecomer plateau. A portion of this plateau has often been referred to as Slieve Margy. OldLeighlin sits on the eastern slopes of the Johnswell hills in the south of the plateau in county Carlow. In the 6th century Scuithin left Ireland to become a disciple of the Welsh holy man Saint David, whom he is credited with saving from poisoning. On returning home to Ireland he became a hermit and holy man in the Johnswell hills where the memory of his name and abode are preserved in "tigh scuithin." While the site of "Tigh Scuthin" has thankfully been preserved in the eponymous location of Tiscoffin it has unfortunately almost obliterated the memory of St. Scuithin as an actual historical entity.

When the ancient tuatha were reorganised Kilkenny was divided into baronies and parishes. The Kilkenny barony of Gowran includes the civil parish of Tiscoffin (tigh scuithin) which stretches into the Johnswell hills. It seems probable that here, in the 7th century, existed the fluid and fluctuating boundary between the Kingdom of Ossory and that of Leinster in which Oldleighlin is situated. Kilkenny would eventually become a county of Leinster in 1210.

The county Kilkenny town of Castlewarren:(Caisleán an Bhairínigh) in the civil parish of Tiscoffin preserves his memory with the Church of Scuithin. This church is seven kilometres distant from OldLeighlin. No doubt the ancient abode of St. Gobban of OldLeighlin is on the periphery of Tigh Scuthin – Tiscoffin. Also according to the Journal of the Royal Antiquaries of Ireland (1876) St. Gobban may have briefly aboded at tigh Scuithin. (after leaving OldLeighlin and before Killamery) for at a time unknown a monastery was erected here.

Time, linguistic variations, dialects and anglicisation have confused and entangled St Goban and St.Scuithin: however, two distinct historical persons did exist. Vague references to a tascaffin in county Limerick are extant but no designation of that name can be found. However, Tiscoffin monastery, county Kilkenny is in the List of monastic houses in Ireland.

The Goban Saor.

The history of Ireland is steeped in mythology. According to Irish invasion tradition, the fifth group to arrive was the Tuatha Dé Danann. They fought and won many battles and displaced and disposed of the Fir Bolg. The Tuatha de Danann had a trinity of gods of craft, the most important of which was Goibniu. Goibnui forged lethal weapons and brewed their magical elixirs of invincibility. His name in Old Irish Gobae~Gobann translates as smith~craftsman. Gobann the craftsman – a skilled builder – the Gobán Saor. St. Gobhan was renowned as a builder-founder of many churches. However, as a founder, he should be acclaimed, for the churches were not lavish, spectacular Romanesque or Gothic cathedrals but simple mud and wattle mixtures that embraced usually the holy well – Christianized to act as the font. The interconnectedness and mutuality of names and professions undoubtedly gave rise to an expression of oneness.

The Goban Saor of the Tuatha de Danann existed in an un-dateable period of Ireland's pre-history. St. Gobhan's death is recorded during a dateable period of Ireland's early history. Although St. Gobhan is not the goban saor of the Tuatha de Danann, he could be described as a Goban Saor of 6th–7th century Ireland.

== See also ==
- Saint Goban
- Saint Gobain
- Saint Govan
