= Goban =

Goban may refer to:

== People ==
- Saint Gobain or Goban, a 7th-century Irish Benedictine monk
- Saint Goban, a 6th-century Irish Benedictine monk and abbot, brother to Molaise of Leighlin

== Game ==
- goban (game of Go), the board used for the game of Go

== Theatre ==
- Goban, a set of five plays by Tamagusuku Chōkun
