= Purt Castle =

Castle in County Limerick, Ireland

Coordinates: 52.3995°N 9.3198°W

Purt Castle or Port Castle (Irish: Caisleán Phort Trí Namhad) is a ruined Geraldine castle near Abbeyfeale, County Limerick, Ireland. The castle is known variously as 'Purt Castle', 'Port Castle', or 'Portrinard Castle' in sources.

The remains of the castle are situated in the townland of Port (Irish: Port Trí Namhad) about 2 km northwest of the town of Abbeyfeale, on the north bank of the River Feale.

Originally built by the Earls of Desmond in the 15th century, a plaque on the site indicates that it was destroyed c. 1580 during the Second Desmond Rebellion. Only fragmentary remains of the rectangular tower house still stand.
