= Abbeyfeale =

Town in County Limerick, Ireland

Abbeyfeale Mainistir na Féile
- Town
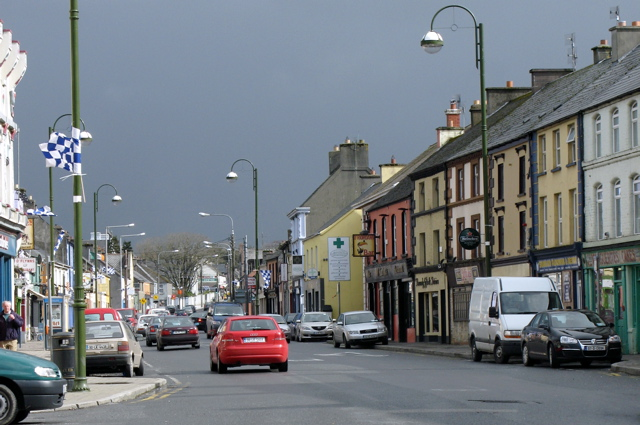
- Abbeyfeale Main Street

- Location in Ireland
- Coordinates: 52.386°N 9.294°W
- Country: Ireland
- Province: Munster
- County: Limerick
- Local electoral area: Newcastle
- Dáil constituency: Limerick County
- EU Parliament: South
- Elevation: 75 m (246 ft)

Population (2022)
  - Total: 2,206
- Time zone: UTC0 (WET)
  - Summer (DST): UTC+1 (IST)
- Eircode routing key: V94
- Area code: +353(0)68
- Irish Grid Reference: R111268
- Website: abbeyfeale.ie

Abbeyfeale (/ˈæbifeɪl/; Irish: Mainistir na Féile, meaning 'abbey of the Feale') is a historic market town in County Limerick, Ireland, near the border with County Kerry. The town is on the N21 road from Limerick to Tralee, some 21 kilometres (13 miles) south-west of Newcastle West and 16 kilometres (10 miles) south-east of Listowel and 38 kilometres (24 miles) north-east of Tralee. The town is in a civil parish of the same name.

== Geography ==
The town is situated on the banks of the River Feale in the foothills of the Mullaghareirk Mountains.

== History ==
In 1418, Thomas FitzGerald, 5th Earl of Desmond was dispossessed of his lands and deprived of his earldom by his paternal uncle, James FitzGerald, 6th Earl of Desmond, after Thomas had concluded a marriage far below his station to Catherine MacCormac of Abbeyfeale; Catherine was the daughter of one of Thomas's dependants, William MacCormac, known as "the Monk of Feale." A marriage between a man of Norman blood and a woman of Gaelic ancestry violated the Statutes of Kilkenny.

== Town ==
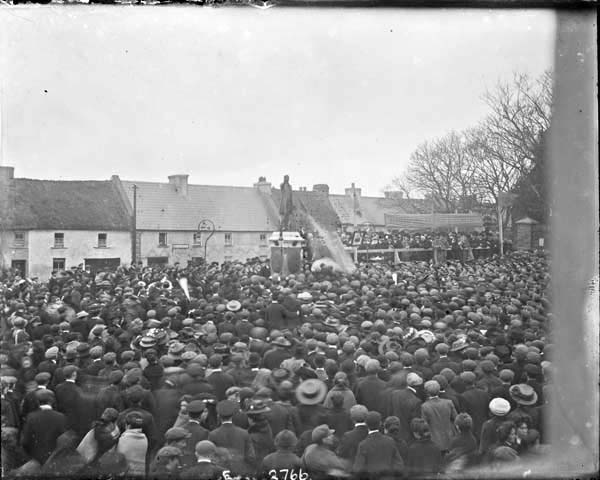
Unveiling of statue to Father William Casey in 1910

The main feature in Abbeyfeale's Square is a statue of Father William Casey. Fr. Casey was the parish priest from 1883 to 1907 and helped the tenant farmers fight against their landlords. The local Gaelic football team is named in his honour (Fr. Caseys GAA Club). Recently the town celebrated the centenary of Fr. Casey's influence by having a Fr. Casey-themed Saint Patrick's Day Parade.

The May Bank Holiday weekend sees the town host the "Fleadh by the Feale" traditional music festival. The 2009 festival was the thirteenth of these annual events. The International Bone Playing Competition is one of the highlights of the festival and is held on the Bank Holiday Monday evening on an open-air stage in the town square.

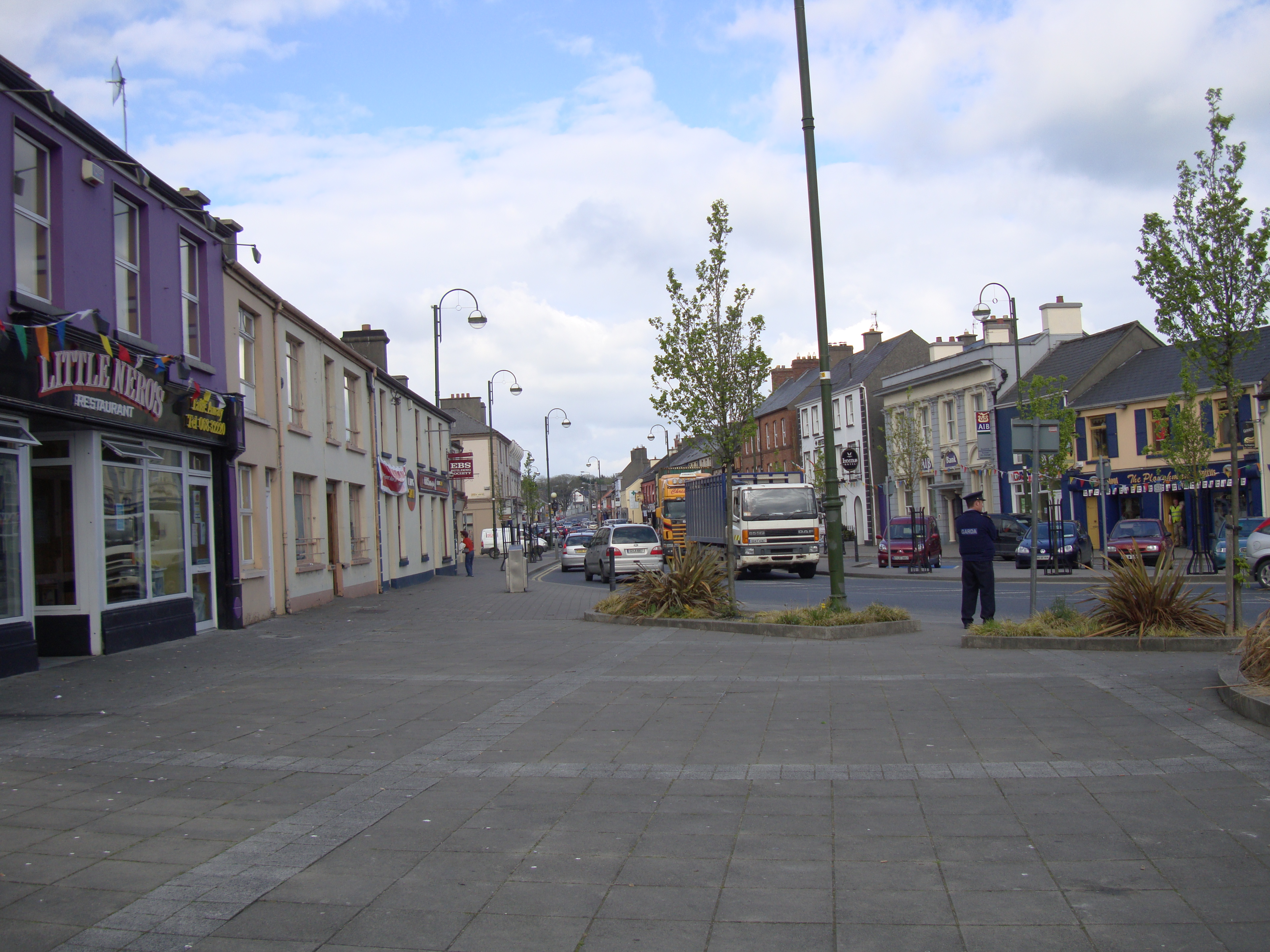
Abbeyfeale town centre

The town is known for its musical traditions, and traditional musicians such as Donal Murphy and Eibhlin Healy have lived in the town.

There was a cinema in the town, opened by the Tobin family in the 1940s designed in the classical tradition. Its demise came about with the advent of the multi-complex and it closed in the early 1990s. It is now a protected building and still stands today. The town had a dancehall, "The Abbey Ballroom", also established by the Tobin family in the 1930/1940s. Many big bands of the time played there. With the opening of the dance/pubs, it closed in the 1980s.

The town previously had an abbey, located in the centre of the town square, but this has since all but disappeared, and the only identifiable remnants are those used in the construction of the Roman Catholic Church in 1847, on the site of the current boys' national school on Church street. Church street as it is now known was originally named Chapel street, as can be seen in old-period OS maps of the town. The Geraldine Portrinard Castle (or Purt Castle) is situated about 2.5 km northwest of the town, on the north bank of the Feale.

== Transport ==
Abbeyfeale railway station opened on 20 December 1880, but was finally closed on 3 November 1975. The Great Southern Trail is a greenway rail trail that follows the route of the former Limerick-Tralee railway line between Abbeyfeale and Rathkeale.

Abbeyfeale is served by Bus Éireann routes 13 (Tralee-Limerick) and Route 14 (Killarney-Limerick) and Dublin Coach from Tralee/Killarney to Dublin

== Education ==
Schools include Coláiste Íde agus Iosef, a secondary school serving Limerick and surrounding counties. The boys' school is called St Mary's and the girls' school is called Scoil Mháithair Dé.

== Sports ==
Abbeyfeale has several sporting clubs, including Father Caseys Gaelic football club, Abbeyfeale United FC soccer club, and Abbyefeale RFC (rugby union).

== Notable people ==
- Denis Behan, a former striker for Cork City and Republic of Ireland U23.
- William Casey, priest and local Land League leader
- Phil Danaher, Irish Rugby International and Gaelic Footballer (Limerick Senior team, Kerry minor team), grew up in Abbeyfeale.
- Richard J. Hayes, World War II cryptographer and Director of the National Library of Ireland.
- Michael Lenihan, Bishop of the Roman Catholic Diocese of La Ceiba in Honduras, was born in Abbeyfeale.
- Paddy Moriarty, Irish émigré to Australia whose disappearance was the subject of an American documentary in 2023, Last Stop Larrimah.

== See also ==
- List of towns and villages in Ireland
