= Ronan O'Connor =

Ronan O'Connor may refer to:

== Sportspeople ==
- Ronan O'Connor (Ballyduff Gaelic footballer), Gaelic footballer and hurler for Kerry
- Ronan O'Connor (St Michael's/Foilmore Gaelic footballer), Gaelic footballer for Kerry

== Other people ==
- Ronan O'Connor, protagonist of the 2014 video game Murdered: Soul Suspect
