= Giles O'Grady =

Irish hurler and Gaelic footballer

Personal information
- Born: Ballyduff, County Kerry

Sport
- Sport: Hurling & Football
- Position: Back
Clubs
- Years: Club
- 1992-2008 2008-present: Ballyduff; Kerins O'Rahilly's
Club titles
- Kerry titles: 0
- Munster titles: 0
- All-Ireland Titles: 0
Inter-county
- Years: County
- 2000's 2000's: Kerry (F) Kerry (H)

Giles O'Grady is a Gaelic footballer and hurler from Ballyduff in County Kerry, Ireland.
