= List of shipwrecks in November 1846 =

The list of shipwrecks in November 1846 includes ships sunk, foundered, wrecked, grounded, or otherwise lost during November 1846.

== 1 November ==
List of shipwrecks: 1 November 1846
| Ship | State | Description |
|---|---|---|
| HMS Cyclops | Royal Navy | The Cyclops-class frigate ran aground on the Gurnet Ledge, in The Solent. She was on a voyage from Portsmouth, Hampshire to Lisbon, Portugal. HMS Cyclops was refloated the next day and resumed her voyage. |
| Policy | United Kingdom | The ship ran aground on Saltholmen, Sweden. She was on a voyage from Saint Petersburg, Russia to Hull, Yorkshire. She was refloated the next day and resumed her voyage. |
| Pottinger | United Kingdom | The paddle steamer ran aground in Gurnard Bay. She was on a voyage from Alexandria, Egypt to Southampton, Hampshire. She was refloated and completed her voyage. |

== 2 November ==
List of shipwrecks: 2 November 1846
| Ship | State | Description |
|---|---|---|
| Brothers | United Kingdom | The ship was wrecked on the Binks, at the mouth of the Humber. Her crew were rescued. She was on a voyage from Middlesbrough, Yorkshire to Sandwich, Kent. |
| Heir of Madryn | United Kingdom | The ship was driven ashore in the Bay of Luce. She was on a voyage from Liverpool, Lancashire to the Clyde. |
| Rosalinda | United Kingdom | The brig sprang a leak and sank off Kirkcudbright, She was on a voyage from Maryport, Cumberland to Belfast, County Down or Dublin. |

== 3 November ==
List of shipwrecks: 3 November 1846
| Ship | State | Description |
|---|---|---|
| Helen | United Kingdom | The ship was driven ashore at Ipswich, Suffolk. She was refloated the next day. |
| Truce | Stettin | The ship foundered in the North Sea. Her crew were rescued by Moses (United Kingdom). |

== 4 November ==
List of shipwrecks: 5 November 1846
| Ship | State | Description |
|---|---|---|
| Agenoria | United Kingdom | The brig ran aground in the Seine at Villequier, Seine-Inférieure and was severely damaged. |
| Arethusa | United Kingdom | The ship was abandoned in the Atlantic Ocean. Her crew were rescued by Britannia (United Kingdom). Arethusa was on a voyage from Liverpool, Lancashire to Halifax, Nova Scotia, British North America. |
| Athalia | United Kingdom | The ship ran aground off Redcar, Yorkshire. She was on a voyage from Whitby to Middlesbrough. She was refloated and towed in to Middlesbrough. |
| Vine | United Kingdom | The schooner ran aground and capsized in the Seine at Villequier and was wrecked. Her crew were rescued. |

== 5 November ==
List of shipwrecks: 5 November 1846
| Ship | State | Description |
|---|---|---|
| Ann | United Kingdom | The ship ran aground and was severely damaged at South Shields, County Durham. She was on a voyage from South Shields to Aden. She was refloated and put back to South Shields. |
| Brothers Increase | United Kingdom | The sloop was driven ashore and wrecked at Peterhead, Aberdeenshire. |
| Ceram | Netherlands | The East Indiaman was wrecked on Prince's Island. Her 45 crew were rescued by HMS Sylph (Royal Navy). |
| Industry | United Kingdom | The ship struck the pier and was damaged at Helsingør Denmark. She was on a voyage from Saint Petersburg, Russia to Leith, Lothian. |
| Sisters | United Kingdom | The ship sprang a leak and was beached at Grimsby, Lincolnshire. |
| Thorn | United Kingdom | The ship departed from Montreal, Province of Canada for Canso, Nova Scotia, British North America. No further trace, presumed foundered with the loss of all hands. |

== 6 November ==
List of shipwrecks: 6 November 1846
| Ship | State | Description |
|---|---|---|
| Chepstow | United Kingdom | The ship struck the Charstone Rock and sank. She was on a voyage from Bristol, Gloucestershire to Chepstow, Monmouthshire. She was refloated and taken into Chepstow in a damaged condition. |
| Lavinia | United Kingdom | The ship ran aground and was wrecked on the Shipwash Sand, in the North Sea off the coast of Essex. Her crew were rescued. She was on a voyage from Seaham, County Durham to London. |
| Martha Grace | United Kingdom | The ship was driven ashore at Maryport, Cumberland. She was on a voyage from Maryport to Dublin. She was refloated the next day and taken in to Maryport. |
| St. Anns | United Kingdom | The ship was driven ashore "on the Tenkin". She was refloated and resumed her voyage. |

== 8 November ==
List of shipwrecks: 8 November 1846
| Ship | State | Description |
|---|---|---|
| Apollo | United Kingdom | The ship sprang a leak in the North Sea. She was on a voyage from Gothenburg, Sweden to Bristol, Gloucestershire. She put in to Grimsby, Lincolnshire in a waterlogged condition. She was consequently condemned. |

== 9 November ==
List of shipwrecks: 9 November 1846
| Ship | State | Description |
|---|---|---|
| Friedrich Wilhelm III | Danzig | The ship was driven ashore on "Hocen Island". She was on a voyage from Liverpool, Lancashire, United Kingdom to Danzig. She was refloated and resumed her voyage. |
| Rodolog | United Kingdom | The ship was driven ashore in Cardigan Bay. She was on a voyage from Aberdovey, Merionethshire to Liverpool. |

== 10 November ==
List of shipwrecks: 10 November 1846
| Ship | State | Description |
|---|---|---|
| Andromache | United Kingdom | The full-rigged ship was driven ashore at Grimsby, Lincolnshire. |
| Athina | Kingdom of the Two Sicilies | The ship was wrecked at Messina. She was on a voyage from Galați, Ottoman Empire to Messina. |
| Emelie Therese | Danzig | The ship was driven ashore and wrecked near Withernsea, Yorkshire, United Kingdom. Her crew were rescued. She was on a voyage from Danzig to Hull, Yorkshire. |
| Jane | United Kingdom | The ship was driven ashore near Waterloo, Lancashire. She was on a voyage from Liverpool, Lancashire to Greenock, Renfrewshire. |
| Matador | United Kingdom | The ship was driven ashore near Waterloo. She was on a voyage from Liverpool to Stettin. |
| Oporto | Portugal | The ship departed from Viana do Castelo. No further trace, presumed foundered with the loss of all hands. |
| Pandora | United Kingdom | The ship was driven ashore and sank near "Dolgoinos". |
| San Archangelo | Kingdom of the Two Sicilies | The ship was wrecked at Messina. She was on a voyage from Odesa to Messina. |
| San Spiridon | Kingdom of the Two Sicilies | The ship was wrecked at Messina. She was on a voyage from Ibrail, Ottoman Empire to Messian. |
| Thetis | United Kingdom | The ship struck a sunken rock in Mount's Bay. She was on a voyage from Swansea, Glamorgan to Jersey, Channel Islands. She put in to Falmouth, Cornwall in a leaky condition. |

== 11 November ==
List of shipwrecks: 11 November 1846
| Ship | State | Description |
|---|---|---|
| Affghanistan | United Kingdom | The ship was driven ashore and wrecked on Cape Sable Island, Nova Scotia, British North America. Her crew were rescued. She was on a voyage from Saint John's, Newfoundland to Sydney, Nova Scotia. |
| Henriette | United Kingdom | The ship was driven ashore west of Calais, France. Her crew were rescued. She was on a voyage from Memel, Prussia to Belfast, County Antrim. She was refloated on 16 November and taken in to Calais for repairs. |
| Hoffnung | Netherlands | The ship was wrecked near Hellevoetsluis, Zeeland. She was on a voyage from Königsberg, Prussia to Rotterdam, South Holland. |
| James and Ann | United Kingdom | The ship ran aground on the Jenkin Sand, in the North Sea off the coast of Kent. She was on a voyage from South Shields, County Durham to London. |
| Neptunus | Norway | The ship sprang a leak and was beached at Land's End, Cornwall, United Kingdom, where she was wrecked. Her crew were rescued. She was on a voyage from Kristianstad to Cádiz, Spain. |
| Observado | Spain | The ship foundered off "Cape St. Antone". Her crew were rescued. She was on a voyage from Barcelona to New Orleans, Louisiana. |
| Peter and Jane | United Kingdom | The ship was driven ashore and damaged near Flamborough Head, Yorkshire. She was on a voyage from Bridlington to Hartlepool, County Durham, She was refloated and put back to Bridlington. |
| Tivo | Netherlands | The ship was wrecked on the Ooster Sandbank, in the North Sea. Her crew were rescued. She was on a voyage from Kronstadt, Russia to Schiedam, South Holland. |

== 12 November ==
List of shipwrecks: 12 November 1846
| Ship | State | Description |
|---|---|---|
| Dorothy | United Kingdom | The brig was wrecked on the Gunfleet Sand, in the North Sea off the coast of Essex. Her crew were rescued. She was on a voyage from Sunderland, County Durham to London. |
| Elizabeth | United Kingdom | The ship foundered in the Bristol Channel off Black Nore, Somerset with the loss of two of her crew. She was on a voyage from Newport, Monmouthshire to Cardiff, Glamorgan. |
| Hebe | United Kingdom | The ship ran aground on the Haisborough Sands, in the North Sea off the coast of Norfolk. She was refloated and beached at Winterton-on-Sea, Norfolk, where she subsequently became a wreck. |

== 13 November ==
List of shipwrecks: 13 November 1846
| Ship | State | Description |
|---|---|---|
| Hopkinson | United Kingdom | The barque was driven ashore at Point Escuminac, New Brunswick, British North America. She was on a voyage from Miramichi, New Brunswick to Liverpool, Lancashire. She was consequently condemned. |
| Marie | Denmark | The brig ran aground on the Nore and sank. She was on a voyage from Aalborg to London, United Kingdom. She was refloated the next day and taken in to Southend, Essex, United Kingdom. |
| Mozambique | United Kingdom | The ship was driven ashore and damaged at Cork. She was on a voyage from Cork to Saint John, New Brunswick. She was refloated the next day and towed back to Cork. |
| Teviot | United Kingdom | The ship ran aground on the Nore. She was on a voyage from Newcastle upon Tyne, Northumberland to London. She was refloated. |

== 14 November ==
List of shipwrecks: 14 November 1846
| Ship | State | Description |
|---|---|---|
| Charlotte | Sweden | The ship was driven ashore and wrecked near "Bullen", Russia. |
| Dante | Kingdom of Sardinia | The ship was wrecked at Genoa. Her crew survived. |
| Emelie | United Kingdom | The ship ran aground off Rügen, Prussia. Her crew were rescued. She was on a voyage from Königsberg, Prussia to London. |
| Mary and Agnes | United Kingdom | The ship was in collision with a brig and was damaged. She put in to Sunderland, County Durham where she ran aground. Subsequently refloated and taken in to Sunderland. |
| Montrose | United Kingdom | The steamship was abandoned in a gale at Genoa. |

== 15 November ==
List of shipwrecks: 15 November 1846
| Ship | State | Description |
|---|---|---|
| Albion | United Kingdom | The ship was run down and sunk in the North Sea by a steamship with the loss of a crew member. She was on a voyage from Woodbridge, Suffolk to London. |
| USS Boston | United States Navy | The sloop of war was wrecked on Eleuthera Island, Bahamas. Her crew survived. |
| Cora | United Kingdom | The ship ran aground off Hiiumaa, Russia. She was on a voyage from Saint Petersburg, Russia to London. She had become a wreck by 15 December. |
| Flora | (United Kingdom of Great Britain and Ireland) British North America | The ship was abandoned in the Atlantic Ocean. Her crew were rescued by Wescustogo (United States). |
| Industry | United Kingdom | The schooner ran aground on the Haisborough Sands or Scroby Sands, in the North Sea off the coast of Norfolk and sank. Her crew were rescued by the brig Baltic (United Kingdom). She was on a voyage from Whitby, Yorkshire to Lowestoft, Suffolk |
| Isle of Wight | United Kingdom | The ship was driven ashore near Dungeness, Kent. Her crew were rescued. She was on a voyage from London to Mauritius. She was refloated on 17 November and taken in to Dover, Kent. |
| Kura (Кура) | Imperial Russian Navy | The transport ship sprang a severe leak and was beached near Tarki, in the Caspian Sea. Her crew were rescued. She was subsequently dismantled. |

== 16 November ==
List of shipwrecks: 16 November 1846
| Ship | State | Description |
|---|---|---|
| Aldrich | United States | The ship was driven ashore south of the Chincoteague Inlet, Virginia with the loss of two of her crew. She was on a voyage from Norfolk, Virginia to Bordeaux, Gironde, France. |
| Bellona | United Kingdom | The ship foundered off Hartland Point, Devon. Her crew were rescued. She was on a voyage from Cardiff, Glamorgan to Shoreham-by-Sea, Sussex. |
| Catherine | United Kingdom | The schooner ran aground and was damaged at Fraserburgh, Aberdeenshire. She was on a voyage from Cromarty to Newcastle upon Tyne, Northumberland. |
| Chance | United Kingdom | The ship ran aground at Dover, Kent. |
| Elizabeth | United Kingdom | The ship ran aground on the Skee Rocks, off the coast of Glamorgan. Her crew were rescued. She was refloated on 2 December and taken in to Port Talbot. |
| Fancy | United Kingdom | The schooner was in collision with HMS Emerald (Royal Navy) and sank in the English Channel off Start Point, Devon. Her five crew were rescued by HMS Emerald. |
| Industry | United Kingdom | The ship ran aground on Scroby Sands, Norfolk and sank. Her crew were rescued. |
| Isabella | United Kingdom | The brig ran aground on the Abertay Sand, in the North Sea off the coast of Forfarshire. She was on a voyage from Saint Petersburg, Russia to Dundee, Forfarshire. She was refloated and taken in to Dundee in a leaky condition. |
| James Reed | United Kingdom | The ship ran aground on the Abertay Sand. She was on a voyage from Saint Petersburg to Dundee. She was refloated and taken in to Dundee. |
| Juno | United Kingdom | The schooner was driven ashore and damaged at Dromore, County Down. |
| Margaret | United Kingdom | The ship was wrecked at the mouth of the River Foyle. |
| Mary | (United Kingdom of Great Britain and Ireland) Guernsey | The ship was wrecked at Grenada. Her crew were rescued. She was on a voyage from Lisbon, Portugal to Grenada. Reported in Lloyd's List as being wrecked at the mouth of the Rio Grande. |
| Mary Ann | United Kingdom | The ship was driven ashore at South Shields, County Durham. She was on a voyage from London to South Shields. She was refloated and taken in to South Shields. |

== 17 November ==
List of shipwrecks: 17 November 1846
| Ship | State | Description |
|---|---|---|
| Helen and Elizabeth | United Kingdom | The barque was wrecked on Burgh Head, Wigtownshire with the loss of all fourteen crew. She was on a voyage from Maryport, Cumberland to Belfast, County Antrim. |
| Janet Hay | United Kingdom | The ship was driven ashore at Lossiemouth, Lothian. She was on a voyage from Cardiff, Glamorgan to Hull, Yorkshire. |
| Manico | United Kingdom | The ship ran aground and was severely damaged at Littlehampton, Sussex. She was on a voyage from Memel, Prussia to Littlehampton. She was refloated and taken in to Littlehampton. |
| Sara | United Kingdom | The ship ran aground on the Droogden, in the North Sea off the coast of the Duchy of Holstein. She was on a voyage from Königsberg, Prussia to Hull, Yorkshire. She was refloated and taken in to Tønning. |

== 18 November ==
List of shipwrecks: 18 November 1846
| Ship | State | Description |
|---|---|---|
| Dove | United Kingdom | The ship was driven ashore at "Capsali", Greece. Her crew were rescued. She was on a voyage from Algiers, Algeria to Odesa. |
| Enigheten | Norway | The sloop was in collision with Rhine (United Kingdom) and foundered in the North Sea. Her crew were rescued by Rhine. Enigheten was on a voyage from Bergen to an Irish port. |
| Francis | United Kingdom | The ship was driven ashore at Ventava, Courland Governorate and was abandoned by her crew. She was on a voyage from Kirkcaldy, Fife to Ventspils. She was refloated on 23 November and taken in to Ventspils. |
| Hero | United States | The ship was driven ashore on Long Island, New York. She was on a voyage from New York City to Saint John, New Brunswick, British North America. |
| Maricco | Prussia | The ship ran aground at Littlehampton, Sussex, United Kingdom and was severely damaged. She was on a voyage from Memel to Littlehampton. She was refloated and taken in to Littlehampton. |
| Nottingham | United Kingdom | The ship was abandoned in the Atlantic Ocean. Her crew were rescued by Ocean Queen (United Kingdom. Nottingham was on a voyage from Quebec City, Province of Canada, British North America to Liverpool, Lancashire. |

== 19 November ==
List of shipwrecks: 19 November 1846
| Ship | State | Description |
|---|---|---|
| Ainsworth | United States | The ship was driven ashore in Lake Erie. |
| A. P. Haywood | United States | The ship was driven ashore in Lake Erie. |
| Charles | United States | The ship was driven ashore in Lake Erie. |
| Cleveland | United States | The schooner was driven ashore in Lake Erie. |
| Columbus | United Kingdom | The ship ran aground and broke her back at Plymouth, Devon. |
| Commerce | United Kingdom | The smack foundered in the English Channel west of the Isle of Wight. She was on a voyage from Poole, Dorset to Lymington, Hampshire. |
| Creole | United States | The steamship was wrecked on a reef off Nuevitas, Cuba with the loss of 73 of the 155 people on board. She was on a voyage from Bordeaux, Gironde, France to New Orleans, Louisiana. |
| Duke of Clarence | United Kingdom | The ship was driven ashore at Downderry, Cornwall. Her crew were rescued. She was on a voyage from London to Newport, Monmouthshire. |
| Europe | United States | The brig was driven ashore at Fairpoint, Ohio. |
| Foreningen | Sweden | The ship was driven ashore near "Wiken". She was on a voyage from Leith, Lothian, United Kingdom to Stockholm. She was refloated and taken in to Helsingborg. |
| Gloria | United Kingdom | The yacht ran aground at Hirtshals. She was refloated. |
| Harmony | United Kingdom | The ship was driven ashore and scuttled at Milford Haven, Pembrokeshire. She was on a voyage from Waterford to Cardiff, Glamorgan. She was refloated on 23 November. |
| Helen Strong | United States | The ship was wrecked in Lake Erie. |
| Hero | United Kingdom | The schooner was driven ashore on Long Island, New York, United States. She was on a voyage from New York City to Saint John's, Newfoundland. |
| H. H. Siser | United States | The brig was driven ashore in Lake Erie. |
| Huron | United Kingdom | The schooner was driven ashore in Lake Erie. |
| Indian Queen | United States | The steamship was driven ashore and wrecked at Dunkirk, New York. |
| John | United Kingdom | The ship was driven ashore on Læsø, Denmark.Her crew were rescued. She was on a voyage from Riga, Russia to Portsmouth, Hampshire. |
| John Hancock | United States | The ship was driven ashore and wrecked in Lake Erie. |
| Lady of the Lake | United Kingdom | The ship was driven ashore and damaged at Milford Haven. She was on a voyage from Bristol, Gloucestershire to Smyrna, Ottoman Empire. She was refloated. |
| Laura | United Kingdom | The ship was driven ashore and scuttled at Milford Haven. She was on a voyage from Gloucester to Dublin. She was refloated. |
| Norman | United Kingdom | The barque was lost in the Bristol Channel off Southhook Point, Pembrokeshire. Her crew survived. She was on a voyage from Belfast, County Antrim to Cardiff, or Dublin to Swansea. |
| Osceola | United States | The brig was driven ashore in Lake Erie with the loss of four of her crew. |
| Saguenay | United Kingdom | The barque was driven ashore and severely damaged at "Ballycrenan", County Cork. She was on a voyage from Miramichi, New Brunswick, British North America to Liverpool, Lancashire. She was refloated on 2 February 1847 and taken in to Cork. |
| Sea Lark | United Kingdom | The schooner capsized in the Atlantic Ocean off Ballybunion, County Kerry with the loss of all six crew. She was on a voyage from Askeaton, County Limerick to Tralee, County Kerry. She came ashore at Ballybunion and was plundered. Sea Lark was refloated on 14 July 1847 and taken in to Kilrush, County Clare. |
| Senator | United Kingdom | The screw steamer was driven ashore and wrecked in Ballybunion Bay. She was refloated on 3 December and taken in to Limerick. |
| Swan | United States | The schooner was severely damaged in Lake Erie. |
| United States | United States | The ship was driven ashore in Lake Erie. |
| Union | United Kingdom | The ship was driven ashore and severely damaged at Angle, Pembrokeshire. She was on a voyage from Wicklow to Bristol. |
| Whim | United Kingdom | The ship was driven ashore at "Lappemiesche", Denmark. She was refloated on 21 November and taken in to Riga. |

== 20 November ==
List of shipwrecks: 20 November 1846
| Ship | State | Description |
|---|---|---|
| Adelaide | United States | The ship was driven ashore at New York. She was on a voyage from New York to Galway, United Kingdom. She was refloated and resumed her voyage |
| Æneas | United Kingdom | The coasting schooner was driven ashore and damaged at Cork. |
| Alice | United Kingdom | The ship was driven ashore at Topsham, Devon. She was refloated. |
| Allen | United States | The ship was driven ashore and wrecked between Boulogne and Étaples, Pas-de-Calais, France with the loss of eleven of her seventeen crew. |
| Alpha | United Kingdom | The ship was driven ashore at Plymouth, Devon. She was on a voyage from Port Gaverne, Cornwall to Plymouth. |
| Ann | United Kingdom | The ship was driven ashore and damaged at Penzance, Cornwall. She was on a voyage from Liverpool, Lancashire to Folkestone, Kent. She was refloated the next day. |
| Beaufront | United Kingdom | The ship departed from Newcastle upon Tyne, Northumberland for London. Presumed foundered with the loss of all hands; a boat from Beaufront was discovered off the Vlie in late December. |
| Britain | United Kingdom | The brig was driven ashore and wrecked at Tynemouth, Northumberland. She was on a voyage from South Shields, County Durham to London. |
| Carr Rock | United Kingdom | The sloop foundered off Leith, Lothian with the loss of all three crew. |
| Chester | (United Kingdom of Great Britain and Ireland) British North America | The steamship capsized in Clonakilty Bay with the loss of all hands. She was on a voyage from Quebec City, Province of Canada to Liverpool. |
| Clansman | United Kingdom | The ship was driven ashore on Great Cumbrae, Argyllshire. She was on a voyage from Greenock, Renfrewshire to Demerara, British Guiana. She was refloated. |
| Clara | United Kingdom | The ship ran aground on the Foreness Rock, Margate, Kent. She was on a voyage from Guernsey, Channel Islands to London. She was refloated. |
| Colyton Union | United Kingdom | The coaster was wrecked at Lyme, Dorset. Her crew were rescued. She was on a voyage from South Shields, County Durham to Axmouth, Devon. |
| Crown | United Kingdom | The brig was driven ashore and severely damaged at Sunderland, County Durham. She was refloated the next day. |
| Devon | United Kingdom | The ship was driven ashore near Équihen, Pas-de-Calais. Her crew were rescued. She was on a voyage from Plymouth, Devon to London. |
| Eitna | Netherlands | The galiot was driven ashore at North Shields, County Durham. She was refloated the next day and towed in to North Shields. |
| Elizabeth and James | United Kingdom | The ship sank at Hartlepool, County Durham. |
| Ellen and Margaret | United Kingdom | The brig was wrecked at Cork. |
| Fenwick | United Kingdom | The ship was driven ashore at Tynemouth. She was on a voyage from South Shields to London. She was refloated on 26 November and towed in to Sunderland. |
| Flora | United Kingdom | The ship was driven ashore at Topsham. |
| Harlequin | United Kingdom | The ship was abandoned in Liverpool Bay with the loss of two of her crew. Survivors were rescued by the Magazines Lifeboat. She was on a voyage from Cephalonia, United States of the Ionian Islands to Liverpool. She was subsequently towed in to Liverpool. |
| Helen | United States | The ship was driven ashore near Équihen with the loss of all but six of her crew. She was on a voyage from New York to Antwerp, Belgium. |
| Helen | United Kingdom | The ship was wrecked off New York, United States. |
| Heros | United Kingdom | The brig was driven ashore and wrecked at Plymouth. |
| Joren de Lima | Portugal | The ship was wrecked at Haverigg Point, Cumberland, United Kingdom. Her crew were rescued. She was on a voyage from Viana do Castelo to Liverpool. |
| Lowther | United Kingdom | The ship was driven ashore in Bootle Bay. She was on a voyage from Alexandria, Egypt to Liverpool. She was refloated on 30 November. |
| Marquis of Wellesley | United Kingdom | The ship was wrecked at St. Simon, New Brunswick, British North America. Her crew were rescued. |
| Martha | United Kingdom | The schooner was driven ashore and severely damaged at Beaumaris, Anglesey. She was on a voyage from Bangor, Caernarfonshire to Dublin. |
| Mary | United Kingdom | The schooner was driven ashore at Lynch, Somerset. Her crew were rescued. She was on a voyage from Hayle, Cornwall to Llanelly, Glamorgan. |
| Mary Elliot | United Kingdom | The coasting schooner was driven ashore and damaged at Cork. |
| Mayflower, and Test | United Kingdom | The brigs collided in the North Sea off Robin Hoods Bay, North Riding of Yorkshire. Mayflower sank. Test was beached at South Shields, County Durham. |
| Nymph | United Kingdom | The ship ran aground on the Foreness Rock. She was on a voyage from Chester, Cheshire to London. She was refloated. |
| Oberon | United Kingdom | The ship departed from Sierra Leone for Liverpool. Presumed to have subsequently foundered with the loss of all hands; a cask of palm oil that formed part of her cargo was picked up at sea by James (United Kingdom). |
| Plymouth | United Kingdom | The ship was driven ashore near Équihen. |
| Providence | United Kingdom | The ship was driven ashore and damaged at Great Yarmouth, Norfolk. She was refloated. |
| Sarah | United Kingdom | The flat was driven ashore at Beaumaris. |
| Scotsman | United Kingdom | The ship was driven on to rocks at Bic, Province of Canada. She was refloated but sank with the loss of all but one of her crew. She was on a voyage from Montreal, Province of Canada to Liverpool. |
| Sisters | United Kingdom | The ship was lost on the Darking Sand, off the south coast of Devon. Her crew were rescued by Ebenezer (United Kingdom). |
| Skerryvore | United Kingdom | The steam tug sank at Liverpool. |
| Sofia | Kingdom of the Two Sicilies | The brig was driven ashore at Cork. She was refloated. |
| Sophia | (Netherlands) Surinam | The droghing schooner was holed by her anchor and sank in the Courantyne River. |
| Speculator | United Kingdom | The ship was driven ashore and severely damaged at North Penmon, Anglesey. She was on a voyage from Holyhead to Menai Bridge. |
| Sprightly | United Kingdom | The ship foundered in the Irish Sea off Amlwch, Anglesey. Her crew were rescued by the pilot boat № 5 (United Kingdom). Sprightly was on a voyage from Liverpool to Holyhead, Anglesey. |
| Trader | United Kingdom | The schooner was wrecked at Llanelly with the loss of all hands. |
| Valiant | United Kingdom | The smack was driven ashore at Skerries, County Dublin. Her crew were rescued. |
| Victoria | United Kingdom | The schooner was wrecked in St Brides Bay. Her crew were rescued. |
| Wakefield | United Kingdom | The ship was driven ashore in Bootle Bay. She was on a voyage from Saint John, New Brunswick, British North America to Liverpool. She was refloated on 2 December but was driven ashore, capsized and was wrecked at Egremont, Lancashire. |

== 21 November ==
List of shipwrecks: 21 November 1846
| Ship | State | Description |
|---|---|---|
| Charlotte | United Kingdom | The ship was driven ashore and damaged at Milford Haven, Pembrokeshire. She was on a voyage from the Clyde to Newport, Monmouthshire. She was refloated. |
| Earl of Kingston | United Kingdom | The ship was driven ashore and damaged in Angle Bay. She was on a voyage from Newport to Liverpool, Lancashire. |
| Edward | United Kingdom | The ship ran aground on the Inner Vogel Sand, in the North Sea. She was on a voyage from Hull, Yorkshire to Hamburg. She was refloated on 24 November and taken in to Cuxhaven. |
| Elizabeth | Norway | The ketch was wrecked near Gunwalloe, Cornwall, United Kingdom with the loss of four of her eight crew. Survivors were rescued by the Coast Guard. She was on a voyage from "Ivica" to Bergen. |
| Elizabeth | United Kingdom | The steamship was driven ashore at Flimby, Cumberland. She was on a voyage from Belfast, County Antrim to Port Carlisle, Cumberland. She was refloated and towed in to Maryport, Cumberland. |
| Firefly | United Kingdom | The paddle steamer struck the quayside at Ardrossan, Ayrshire and sank at the bows. |
| Flora | United Kingdom | The ship was driven ashore and wrecked at Milford Haven. She was on a voyage from Aberdovey, Merionethshire to Newport, Monmouthshire. She was refloated on 25 November. |
| Helen | United Kingdom | The sloop was lost off Mothecombe, Devon with the loss of all hands. She was on a voyage from Perros, Côtes-du-Nord, France to Plymouth. |
| Hope | United Kingdom | The ship ran aground and was damaged at Milford Haven. She was on a voyage from Cardiff, Glamorgan to Dublin. |
| Jane and Mary | United Kingdom | The ship struck the Horse Bank, in the Irish Sea off the coast of Lancashire and sank. Her crew were rescued by the Southport Lifeboat. She was on a voyage from Waterford to Belfast, County Antrim. |
| Levator | United Kingdom | The steamship was driven ashore in Cashen Bay. All on board were rescued. She was on a voyage from Dublin to Tralee, County Kerry. |
| Lord Fitzgerald | United Kingdom | The ship was driven ashore at Dartmouth, Devon. She was on a voyage from Galway to London. She was refloated and taken in to Dartmouth. |
| Luck's All | United Kingdom | The ship sank in the Humber. She was on a voyage from Goole, Yorkshire to King's Lynn, Norfolk. |
| Maria | United States | The steamboat collided with the steamboat Samson (United States) and sank in the Mississippi River at Natchez, Mississippi with the loss of about 30 lives. Survivors were rescued by the steamboat Talma (United States). |
| Mary Agnes | United Kingdom | The ship was in collision with another vessel and was beached at Sunderland. She was on a voyage from London to South Shields. She was refloated and towed in to Sunderland. |
| Mermaid | United Kingdom | The ship was driven ashore at Hubberstone Pill, Glamorgan. She was on a voyage from Aberystwyth, Cardiganshire to Port Talbot, Glamorgan. |
| Oak | United Kingdom | The ship was driven ashore near "Mowbray", Cumberland. |
| Resolution | United Kingdom | The ship was driven ashore at Milford Haven. |
| Robert | United Kingdom | The ship was driven ashore in Scotch Bay, Pembrokeshire and was scuttled. She was on a voyage from Gloucester to Dublin. She was refloated. |
| Robert and Elizabeth | United Kingdom | The ship was driven ashore at Lytham St. Annes, Lancashire. She was on a voyage from Drogheda, County Louth to Preston, Lancashire. |
| Sceptre | United Kingdom | The ship was wrecked at South Shields with the loss of her captain. Survivors were rescued by Britain (United Kingdom). Sceptre was on a voyage from Blyth, Northumberland to Folkestone, Kent, or South Shields to Rochester, Kent. |
| Spring | United Kingdom | The smack was wrecked on the Trebetherick Rocks, off the coast of Cornwall. Her three crew survived. She was on a voyage from Newport, Monmouthshire to Fowey, Cornwall. |
| Superb | United Kingdom | The ship ran aground on a rock in the Sound of Harris and was severely damaged. She was on a voyage from New York, United States to the Clyde. |
| Venus | United Kingdom | The ship was driven ashore at Hubberstone Pill. |

== 22 November ==
List of shipwrecks: 22 November 1846
| Ship | State | Description |
|---|---|---|
| Active | Rostock | The schooner was driven ashore on Slettestrand near Thisted, Denmark. She was on a voyage from Newhaven, Sussex, United Kingdom to Rostock. |
| Admiral Duncan | United Kingdom | The brig was driven ashore and wrecked at Berck-sur-Mer, Pas-de-Calais, France with the loss of all but one of her six crew. She was on a voyage from London to Nantes, Loire-Inférieure, France. |
| Antelope | United Kingdom | The ship struck the pier and sank at Aberdeen. Her crew were rescued. She was on a voyage from Sunderland, County Durham to Aberdeen. She was refloated on 5 December. |
| Atalanta | United Kingdom | The ship was driven ashore and severely damaged at Dunbar, Lothian. |
| Betsey | United Kingdom | The ship struck the pier and sank at Bridlington, Yorkshire. She was on a voyage from Boston, Lincolnshire to Goole, Yorkshire. She was refloated. |
| Betsey | United Kingdom | The brig was abandoned in the Atlantic Ocean. Her crew were rescued by Gratitude (United Kingdom). Betsey was on a voyage from Patras, Greece to Liverpool, Lancashire. She was taken in to Milford Haven, Pembrokeshire on 25 November by Brazilian (United Kingdom). |
| Dolphin | United Kingdom | The schooner foundered in the Bristol Channel off Llanelly, Glamorgan with the loss of all hands. |
| Dolphin | (United Kingdom of Great Britain and Ireland) British North America | The ship was in collision with a ship at Saint John, New Brunswick and sank. Her crew were rescued. She was on a voyage from Dipper Harbour, New Brunswick to Saint John. |
| Elizabeth | (United Kingdom of Great Britain and Ireland) South Australia | The brig was wrecked in Portland Bay. |
| Eugenie Aurelie | France | The ship collided with Washington (United States) and sankin the Atlantic Ocean. Her crew were rescued by Washington. |
| Jane | United Kingdom | The ship ran aground on the Whiting Sand, in the North Sea off the coast of Norfolk. She was refloated and assisted in to Great Yarmouth in a leaky condition. |
| Jeune Desirée | France | The ship was driven ashore on the "Île de Justia". Her crew were rescued. |
| Newcastle | United Kingdom | The steamship ran aground at Maryport, Cumberland. She was on a voyage from Belfast, County Antrim to Carlisle, Cumberland. She was refloated and taken in to Maryport. |
| New Pink | United Kingdom | The ship struck the Soco Calma Rock and foundered. Her crew survived. She was on a voyage from London to Valparaíso, Chile. |
| Ocean Queen | United Kingdom | The ship was severely damaged at Cardiff, Glamorgan. |
| Rowena | (United Kingdom of Great Britain and Ireland) Jersey | The ship foundered off the north Devon coast. She was taken in to Newport, Monmouthshire in a derelict condition on 25 November. |
| Tyro | (United Kingdom of Great Britain and Ireland) British North America | The ship ran aground on the Cockle Sand, in the North Sea off the coast of Norfolk. She was refloated and taken in to Great Yarmouth in a waterlogged condition. |
| Will Watch | (United Kingdom of Great Britain and Ireland) South Australia | The schooner was wrecked in Portland Bay. She had been refloated by 30 December and taken in to Launceston, Van Diemen's Land for repairs. |

== 23 November ==
List of shipwrecks: 23 November 1846
| Ship | State | Description |
|---|---|---|
| Assiduous | United Kingdom | The ship ran aground at Hayle, Cornwall. She was on a voyage from Neath, Glamorgan to Hayle. |
| Celerity | United Kingdom | The ship was driven ashore at New Grimsby, Isles of Scilly. She was on a voyage from Málaga, Spain to London. She was refloated and resumed her voyage. |
| Champion | United Kingdom | The ship was driven ashore on Herm, Channel Islands. |
| Columbine | United Kingdom | The ship was driven ashore and damaged at Barber's Point, in the Dardanelles. She was on a voyage from Liverpool, Lancashire to Galați, Ottoman Empire. She was refloated. |
| Elizabeth | United Kingdom | The ship was driven ashore and wrecked at Aberdovey, Merionethshire. She was on a voyage from Liverpool to Jamaica. |
| Elizabeth | United Kingdom | The sloop was wrecked on the Seaton House Rocks, off the coast of Northumberland. Her crew survived. She was on a voyage from Stockton-on-Tees, County Durham to Leith, Lothian. |
| Indus | (United Kingdom of Great Britain and Ireland) British North America | The ship was driven ashore at Cape George, Nova Scotia. She was on a voyage from Pictou, Nova Scotia to Washington, D.C. She was consequently condemned. |
| Jane | United Kingdom | The ship was driven ashore at Ballycotton, County Cork. Her crew were rescued. |
| Jane and Mary | United Kingdom | The ship was wrecked on the Horse Bank, in the Irish Sea off the coast of Lancashire with the loss of all but her captain. She was on a voyage from New Ross, County Wexford to Belfast, County Antrim. |
| Jessie Torrance | United Kingdom | The ship was wrecked near Clonakilty, County Cork with the loss of nine of the 23 people on board. She was on a voyage from Quebec City, Province of Canada, British North America to Liverpool, Lancashire. |
| Light of the Harem | Ottoman Empire | The ship ran aground off Barber's Point. She was on a voyage from Rio de Janeiro, Brazil to Salonica, Kingdom of Greece and Constantinople. |
| Mermaid | United Kingdom | The ship was wrecked at Point le Beare, Nova Scotia, British North America. Her crew were rescued. She was on a voyage from Saint Vincent to Halifax, Nova Scotia. |
| Renewal | United Kingdom | The ship was wrecked at Westport, Connecticut, United States with the loss of a crew member. She was on a voyage from Saint John, New Brunswick, British North America to Newcastle upon Tyne, Northumberland. |
| San Antonio | Spain | The ship was abandoned in the South China Sea south of Formosa. Her crew were rescued by Margaret Wilkie (United Kingdom). San Antonio was on a voyage from Santa Cruz to Manila, Spanish East Indies. |
| Stentor | United Kingdom | The ship was driven ashore and wrecked in the Gut of Canso. She was on a voyage from Hull, Yorkshire to Miramichi, New Brunswick, British North America. |
| Tweed | Flag unknown | The ship was driven ashore at "Holme's Hall". She was on a voyage from New York, United States to Saint John's, Newfoundland, British North America. She was refloated and taken in to Edgartown, Massachusetts, United States. |
| Wanderer | United Kingdom | The ship was driven ashore at "Holme's Hall". She was on a voyage from New York to Halifax, Nova Scotia, British North America. She was refloated and taken in to Edgartown. |
| Wave | United Kingdom | The ship ran aground on the Arklow Banks, in the Irish Sea off the coast of County Wicklow. She was refloated and anchored off Dublin in a leaky condition. |

== 24 November ==
List of shipwrecks: 24 November 1846
| Ship | State | Description |
|---|---|---|
| Anna | Hamburg | The ship was wrecked at the mouth of the Douro. Her crew were rescued. She was on a voyage from Hamburg to Saint Thomas, Virgin Islands. |
| Dolphin | (United Kingdom of Great Britain and Ireland) British North America | The schooner was driven ashore at Shediac, Nova Scotia. |
| Elizabeth and Anna | United Kingdom | The ship was sighted off Great Yarmouth, Norfolk whilst on a voyage from Denmark to Leith, Lothian. No further trace, presumed foundered with the loss of all hands. |
| Elliots | (United Kingdom of Great Britain and Ireland) British North America | The ship was wrecked in the Magdalen Islands, Nova Scotia with the loss of a crew member. She was on a voyage from Charlottetown, Prince Edward Island to London. |
| Esther | United Kingdom | The ship was sighted off "Ivica". Boats from the ship were discovered in the Mediterranean Sea 30 leagues (90 nautical miles (170 km)) off Cape Tenez, Algeria on 26 November. Presumed foundered with the loss of all hands. She was on a voyage from Ancona, Ottoman Empire to Plymouth, Devon. |
| Neptune | United States | The steamship was wrecked at Tampico, Mexico. Her crew were rescued. |
| Oregon | United States | The schooner was driven ashore at Shediac. |
| Reliance | United Kingdom | The ship was driven ashore at "Matame". She was on a voyage from Quebec City, Province of Canada, British North America to Liverpool, Lancashire. She was refloated on 12 May 1847 and taken in to Quebec City. |
| Skaden | Stettin | The ship was in collision with Schwan (Prussia) and sank off Falsterbo, Sweden. Her crew were rescued by Kalff (Denmark). Skaden was on a voyage from Wick, Caithness, United Kingdom to Stettin. |
| Susan | (United Kingdom of Great Britain and Ireland) British North America | The ship was driven ashore at Point Brewery, Nova Scotia. She was on a voyage from Halifax to Pugwash, Nova Scotia. |

== 25 November ==
List of shipwrecks: 25 November 1846
| Ship | State | Description |
|---|---|---|
| Dolphin | United States | The ship was abandoned in the Atlantic Ocean. Her crew were rescued. She was on a voyage from New York to Liverpool, Nova Scotia, British North America. |
| Ellen Gilmore | United States | The ship was driven ashore near Harpswell, Maine. She was refloated on 28 November and towed in to Harpswell in a severely damaged condition. |
| General Scott | United States | The fishing schooner was lost on the Georges Bank in a gale. Lost with all 8 crewmen. |
| Nais | United Kingdom | The ship was driven ashore at Gibraltar. She was refloated. |
| Neptune | United States | The steamship was wrecked at Tampico, Mexico. |
| North American | United States | The steamship was driven ashore and wrecked on Long Island, New York. All on board were rescued. She was on a voyage from Saint John, New Brunswick, British North America to Boston, Massachusetts. |
| Pearl | Netherlands | The galeass was driven ashore and wrecked near "Brantewick", Sweden. her crew were rescued. She was on a voyage from Saint Petersburg, Russia to Amsterdam, North Holland. |
| Somers | United States | The steamship foundered at Tampico. |
| Urania | United Kingdom | The ship was abandoned in the Atlantic Ocean. Her crew were rescued by Congaree (United Kingdom). Urania was on a voyage from New York to the Clyde. |
| Victoria | United Kingdom | The schooner was wrecked on Glover's Reef. All on board were rescued. She was on a voyage from Truxillo to Belize City, British Honduras. |
| William | United Kingdom | The brig was driven ashore in the Cranberry Isles, Maine, United States. |

== 26 November ==
List of shipwrecks: 26 November 1846
| Ship | State | Description |
|---|---|---|
| Amherst | United Kingdom | The ship departed from Madras, India in a typhoon. No further trace. |
| Anna Dorothea | Netherlands | The ship was abandoned in the Atlantic Ocean. Her crew were rescued by Spartan (United Kingdom). |
| Atlantic | United States | During a voyage from Boston, Massachusetts, to New York City with 75 passengers and crew aboard, the 1,112-Gross register ton sidewheel paddle steamer suffered a boiler explosion and then was wrecked on a reef 5 nautical miles (9.3 km; 5.8 mi) southeast of Fisher's Island at the eastern end of Long Island Sound during a storm with the loss of 40 to 50 lives. Her wreck sank in 20 feet (6.1 m) of water. |
| Brothers | United Kingdom | The ship struck a sunken rock and sank at Prospect, Nova Scotia, British North America with the loss of nine of her crew. |
| Countess of Durham | United Kingdom | The ship was run ashore on "Jeremie Island", British North America. She was on a voyage from Montreal, Province of Canada, British North America to the Clyde. |
| Criolla | Mexico | Mexican-American War:The schooner was captured and burned at Veracruz, Mexico by a cutting out party from USS Somers (United States Navy). Unfortunately the ship was actually a spy ship operated by the U. S. Navy. |
| Edward Bilton | United Kingdom | The ship was severely damaged in a typhoon at Madras. |
| Frances Elizabeth | United States | The schooner was lost near Sparling’s Point, Maine. Crew saved. |
| Friendship | United Kingdom | The brig was abandoned in the Atlantic Ocean (36°24′N 45°20′W). Her crew were rescued by Curteis (United States). Friendship was on a voyage from Liverpool, Lancashire to Halifax, Nova Scotia. |
| Hazard | United Kingdom | The ship was driven ashore at Maryport, Cumberland. She was on a voyage from Douglas, Isle of Man to Maryport. |
| Howard | United Kingdom | The ship was driven ashore on Navy Island, New Brunswick, British North America. She was on a voyage from Saint John, New Brunswick to Liverpool. She was refloated. |
| John McKenzie | United Kingdom | The ship was lost in the Magdalen Islands, Nova Scotia. She was on a voyage from Pictou, Nova Scotia to Liverpool. |
| Lethbridge | Flag unknown | The ship was driven ashore at Sandy Hook, New Jersey, United States. She was on a voyage from Saint John, New Brunswick, British North America to New York, United States. |
| Romulus | United Kingdom | The ship ran aground off Öland, Sweden. She was on a voyage from Riga, Russia to an English port. She was refloated and put in to Karlskrona for repairs. |

== 27 November ==
List of shipwrecks: 27 November 1846
| Ship | State | Description |
|---|---|---|
| Ann | United Kingdom | Ann The ship ran aground on the Shaw Reef. She was on a voyage from Stettin to Sunderland, County Durham. |
| Augusta | India | The ship was abandoned off Point Pedro, Ceylon. Her crew were rescued by Jane Catherine (United Kingdom). |
| Catherine | Kingdom of Hanover | The ship was driven ashore on Skagen, Denmark. She was on a voyage from Pillau, Prussia to King's Lynn, Norfolk, United Kingdom. |
| Christiana | Norway | The ship was wrecked near Hamina, Grand Duchy of Finland with the loss of all hands. |
| Ellergill | United Kingdom | The ship was driven ashore at Bay du Vin, New Brunswick, British North America. She was on a voyage from Miramichi, New Brunswick to Hull, Yorkshire. |
| Farewell | United Kingdom | The ship was abandoned in the Atlantic Ocean. Her crew were rescued by Sheffield (United Kingdom). Farewell was on a voyage from New York, United States to Liverpool, Lancashire. |
| Jane | United Kingdom | The schooner was wrecked on the Herd Sand, in the North Sea off the coast of County Durham. Her crew were rescued by the South Shields Lifeboat. She was on a voyage from Liverpool to North Shields, County Durham. She was refloated on 28 April 1847 and taken in to South Shields. |
| Juliana | United Kingdom | The ship ran aground at the mouth of the River Nene and was damaged. She was on a voyage from Wisbech, Cambridgeshire to Danzig. She consequently put in to Sutton Bridge, Lincolnshire. |
| New York Packet | (United Kingdom of Great Britain and Ireland) British North America | The ship was driven ashore and wrecked at Trepassey, Newfoundland. Her crew were rescued. She was on a voyage from New York to Saint John's, Newfoundland. |
| Nuente Marz | Prussia | The ship was driven ashore near Randers, Norway. She was on a voyage from Hartlepool, County Durham, United Kingdom to Swinemünde. |
| Piatina | United States | The ship was wrecked on the Carysfort Reef. Her crew were rescued. She was on a voyage from New Orleans, Louisiana to Cádiz, Spain. |
| San Nicolo | Flag unknown | The ship was wrecked at Constantinople, Ottoman Empire. She was on a voyage from Berdiansk, Russia to Constantinople. |
| Sophia Wells | United Kingdom | The ship was wrecked on a reef off the Isle of Skye, Outer Hebrides. She was on a voyage from Saint Petersburg, Russia to Belfast, County Antrim. |
| Susquehanna | United Kingdom | The ship was driven ashore and wrecked at Ballycrenan, County Cork. Her crew were rescued. She was on a voyage from America to Liverpool, Lancashire. |

== 28 November ==
List of shipwrecks: 28 November 1846
| Ship | State | Description |
|---|---|---|
| Catherine | (United Kingdom of Great Britain and Ireland) British North America | The ship was driven ashore at "Carriboo". She was on a voyage from Halifax, Nova Scotia to a port on Prince Edward Island. |
| Coverdale | United Kingdom | The brig was driven ashore on the Ilha das Cobras, Rio de Janeiro, Brazil. |
| Falcon | United Kingdom | The ship was driven against the breakwater and was severely damaged at Southwold, Suffolk. She was on a voyage from Newcastle upon Tyne, Northumberland to Southwold. |
| Jane Archbold | United Kingdom | The brig was run down by the steamship Queen Victoria and sank in the River Liffey. Her ten crew were rescued. She was on a voyage from Glasgow, Renfrewshire to Dublin. |
| Jeannie Deans | United Kingdom | The ship was driven ashore near Punta Entinas Sabinal, Spain. She was on a voyage from Ardrossan, Ayrshire to Marseille, Bouches-du-Rhône, France. She was consequently condemned. |
| Mary Jane | United Kingdom | The ship was in collision with a schooner and sank in the English Channel off Eastbourne, Sussex. Her crew were rescued. She was on a voyage from London to Bristol, Gloucestershire. |
| Norske Marie | Flag unknown | The ship was driven ashore and wrecked between Langeoog and Borkum, Kingdom of Hanover. Her crew were rescued. |
| Prince of Wales | United Kingdom | The ship was driven ashore and wrecked at Merlimont, Pas-de-Calais, France. Her crew were rescued. She was on a voyage from Taganrog, Russia to Dover, Kent. |

== 29 November ==
List of shipwrecks: 29 November 1846
| Ship | State | Description |
|---|---|---|
| Almira | United Kingdom | The ship was abandoned in the Atlantic Ocean. Her crew were rescued by USS Southampton (United States Navy). Almira was on a voyage from New York, United States to Limerick. |
| Enterprise | United Kingdom | The ship was driven ashore and wrecked at Plymouth, Devon. She was on a voyage from Gloucester to Plymouth. |
| Friendship | United Kingdom | The ship was driven onto the breakwater at Plymouth and was wrecked. She was on a voyage from Gloucester to Plymouth. |
| Hedenfernes Mirade | Norway | The ship was driven ashore and wrecked near Robin Hoods Bay, Yorkshire, United Kingdom. Her crew were rescued. She was on a voyage from Christiania to Grangemouth, Stirlingshire, United Kingdom. |
| Napoleon | Stralsund | The galeass sprang a leak and foundered in the North Sea. Her crew were rescued by Cecilia (Denmark). She was on a voyage from Newcastle upon Tyne, Northumberland, United Kingdom to Stettin. |
| Regina | (United Kingdom of Great Britain and Ireland) British North America | The ship was wrecked south west of La Orchila, Venezuela with the loss of a crew member. Survivors were rescued by Susannah (United Kingdom). Regina was on a voyage from Curaçao to Barbados. |
| Thomas P. Cope | United States | The full-rigged ship was struck by lightning and destroyed by fire in the Atlantic Ocean. Her crew were rescued by Emigrant (United Kingdom). Thomas P. Cope was on a voyage from Philadelphia, Pennsylvania to Liverpool, Lancashire, United Kingdom. |
| Verbena | United Kingdom | The brig ran aground on the Gunfleet Sand, in the North Sea off the coast of Essex. She was on a voyage from Saint Petersburg, Russia to London. She was refloated and resumed her voyage. |
| Victor | Russia | The ship was driven ashore on Hiiumaa. She was on a voyage from Saint Petersburg to Riga. She was refloated. |

== 30 November ==
List of shipwrecks: 30 November 1846
| Ship | State | Description |
|---|---|---|
| Beaver | (United Kingdom of Great Britain and Ireland) British North America | The schooner was wrecked in Trinity Bay. She was on a voyage from Quebec City, Province of Canada to Miramichi, New Brunswick. |
| Adventurer | (United Kingdom of Great Britain and Ireland) British North America | The ship was wrecked on the Cariboo Ledges. She was on a voyage from Prince Edward Island to Liverpool, Lancashire. |
| Colonist | (United Kingdom of Great Britain and Ireland) British North America | The ship was driven ashore in the Magdalen Islands, Nova Scotia. Her crew were rescued. She was consequently condemned. |
| Delight | United Kingdom | The ship was wrecked at Lindisfarne. Her crew were rescued. She was on a voyage from Grangemouth, Stirlingshire to South Shields, County Durham. |
| Emerald | United Kingdom | The ship was wrecked on Bornholm, Denmark with the loss of all hands. She was on a voyage from Riga, Russia to Londonderry. |
| Gillila | (United Kingdom of Great Britain and Ireland) British North America | The ship was driven ashore and wrecked at Pictou, Nova Scotia. Her crew were rescued. |
| Heinrich | Russia | The schooner was driven ashore 18 wersts (10.37 nautical miles (19.20 km)) from Saaremaa. She was on a voyage from Lisbon, Portugal to Riga. |
| Ida | Russia | The schooner was driven ashore and sank at "Baltic Port". |
| Lofvan | Sweden | The ship was driven ashore and wrecked at North Somercotes, Lincolnshire, United Kingdom. She was on a voyage from Gävle to Hull, Yorkshire, United Kingdom. |
| Lucinde | Prussia | The ship was wrecked on Læsø. Her crew were rescued. She was on a voyage from a Scottish port to Memel. |
| Recovery | (United Kingdom of Great Britain and Ireland) Jamaica | The sloop was driven ashore and wrecked on the coast of Jamaica. |
| Rover | (United Kingdom of Great Britain and Ireland) British North America | The ship was driven ashore at New Glasgow, Nova Scotia. She was on a voyage from Prince Edward Island to New York, United States. She was consequently condemned. |
| Svglassie | Sweden | The ship was holed by ice and beached at Björkö. She was on a voyage from Saint Petersburg, Russia to an English port. |
| Zitella | (United Kingdom of Great Britain and Ireland) British North America | The barque was driven ashore east of Pictou. Her crew were rescued. She was consequently condemned. |

== Unknown date ==
List of shipwrecks: Unknown date in November 1846
| Ship | State | Description |
|---|---|---|
| Achilles | United Kingdom | The ship foundered in Cardigan Bay before 22 November with the loss of all hands. |
| Agnes | United Kingdom | The ship was wrecked after 27 November whilst on a voyage from Cardiff, Glamorgan to Ballyshannon, County Donegal. |
| Aimable Sainte Anne | France | The ship was wrecked east of Boulogne, Pas-de-Calais before 5 November. |
| Alli Riero | Greece | The ship capsized off Sicily before 13 November with the loss of all but two of her crew. |
| Angelique | (United Kingdom of Great Britain and Ireland) British North America | The ship was driven ashore on Prince Edward Island. She was on a voyage from Halifax to Pictou, Nova Scotia. |
| Britannia | United Kingdom | The brig was abandoned in the Atlantic Ocean (47°31′N 15°37′W) on or before 2 November. |
| Brodrene | Norway | The ship ran aground and was severely damaged at Trapani, Sicily. She was refloated after several days. |
| Canton | United States | The fishing schooner was lost on the Georges Bank. Lost with all 7 hands. |
| Commodore Perry | (United Kingdom of Great Britain and Ireland) British North America | The ship was wrecked before 26 November. at Machias, Maine. |
| Consul | Bremen | The ship was wrecked on the Jardanilloes, off the coast of Cuba. She was on a voyage from Trinidad da Cuba, Cuba to Bremen. |
| Cornelia | United Kingdom | The ship was abandoned in the Atlantic Ocean before 26 November. |
| Cromwell | United Kingdom | The ship was abandoned in the Atlantic Ocean before 18 November. |
| David | Belgium | The brig was wrecked on the coast of Sardinia before 30 November. She was on a voyage from Genoa, Kingdom of Sardinia to Antwerp. |
| Elsina | Kingdom of Hanover | The ship was driven ashore and wrecked near Beadnell, Northumberland, United Kingdom before 21 November. |
| Falcon | United Kingdom | The ship was driven ashore on Gotland, Sweden. She was on a voyage from Saint Petersburg, Russia to London. She was refloated and put in to Helsingør, Denmark for repairs, arriving on 16 November. |
| Fox | (United Kingdom of Great Britain and Ireland) British North America | The schooner was wrecked on the coast of Newfoundland. Her crew were rescued. |
| General Scott | United States | The fishing schooner was lost on the Georges Bank. |
| Hero of Acre | United Kingdom | The ship was abandoned in the Atlantic Ocean before 2 November. |
| Ida | (United Kingdom of Great Britain and Ireland) British North America | The schooner foundered off Egg Harbour, New Jersey, United States. She was on a voyage from Africa to Saint John, New Brunswick. |
| Iris | United States | The ship was wrecked on the Florida Reef. Her crew were rescued. She was on a voyage from New Orleans, Louisiana to Belfast, County Antrim, United Kingdom. |
| Iris | Denmark | The brig was wrecked near Porto Alegre, Brazil before 4 November. Her crew were rescued. She was on a voyage from Montevideo, Uruguay to Falmouth, Cornwall, United Kingdom. |
| Joanna | United Kingdom | The ship put in to Lindisfarne, Northumberland in a sinking condition. She was subsequently towed in to Berwick upon Tweed, where she arrived on 23 November. |
| Lark | United Kingdom | The ship was driven ashore at Point Hood. She was on a voyage from Halifax, Nova Scotia to Prince Edward Island. |
| Levant | Flag unknown | The brig was wrecked on Cosmoledo. |
| Liverpool | United Kingdom | The ship departed from Quebec City, Province of Canada, British North America for London in early November. She was subsequently abandoned off the coast of Newfoundland. Later taken in to Saint John's, Newfoundland in a waterlogged condition. She was repaired. |
| Louisa | United Kingdom | The barque was abandoned in the Atlantic Ocean before 5 November. |
| Lowther | United Kingdom | The ship was driven ashore in Bootle Bay before 1 December. She was on a voyage from Alexandria, Egypt Eyalet to Liverpool, Lancashire. She was refloated on 2 December. |
| Mary | (Netherlands) Surinam | The schooner was holed and foundered in the Courantyne River whilst assisting in refloating Mary ( (Netherlands) Surinam. |
| Mayflower | United Kingdom | The schooner was abandoned in the Atlantic Ocean before 1 December. |
| Monte Christo | France | The ship was wrecked near Quiberon, Morbihan. She was on a voyage from Batavia, Netherlands East Indies to Nantes, Loire-Inférieure. |
| Phoenix | (United Kingdom of Great Britain and Ireland) New Zealand | The schooner was lost on her maiden voyage en route to Wellington from Nelson, which she left on 21 November. She was wrecked somewhere near the northern top of the Marlborough Sounds, with the loss of all eight on board. Wreckage was found on small islands close to D'Urville Island. |
| Prima Donna | United Kingdom | The ship sprang a leak and was abandoned before 6 November. Fourteen crew survived. She was on a voyage from Ampana, Netherlands East Indies to Sydney, New South Wales. |
| Princess Charlotte | (United Kingdom of Great Britain and Ireland) Guernsey | The ship was abandoned in the Atlantic Ocean. Her crew were rescued by Caledonia (United Kingdom). Princess Charlotte was on a voyage from Lisbon, Portugal to Cork. She was towed in to Waterford on 25 November by Vesper (United Kingdom). |
| Queen Victoria | (United Kingdom of Great Britain and Ireland) British North America | The ship was wrecked at the West Cape, Prince Edward Island before 10 November. |
| Re David | Belgium | The brig was wrecked on the coast of Sardinia before 30 November. She was on a voyage from Genoa, Kingdom of Sardinia to Antwerp. |
| Rosalie | France | The lugger was wrecked on "Jean de Nove Island". |
| Trew | Stettin | The ship foundered in the North Sea. Her crew were rescued by Moses (United Kingdom). |
| Trial | (United Kingdom of Great Britain and Ireland) British North America | The ship was driven ashore on Cape Sable Island, Nova Scotia. She was on a voyage from Halifax to Tatamagouche. |
| Victoria | United Kingdom | The smack was abandoned in the Irish Sea. She was towed in to Holyhead, Anglesey in a derelict condition by HMS Zephyr (Royal Navy). |
| Zwillinge | Prussia | The ship was lost in the Great Belt before 1 December. She was on a voyage from London to Kiel. |
