= Coláiste Íde agus Iosef =

School in County Limerick, Ireland

Location
- Convent Street, Abbeyfeale, County Limerick; Ireland; 52.3875°N 9.2971°W

Information
- Type: Secondary school
- Motto: Ar Aighaidh le Chėile
- Opened: 2011
- Principal: Liam Murphy
- Enrollment: 692 (2026)
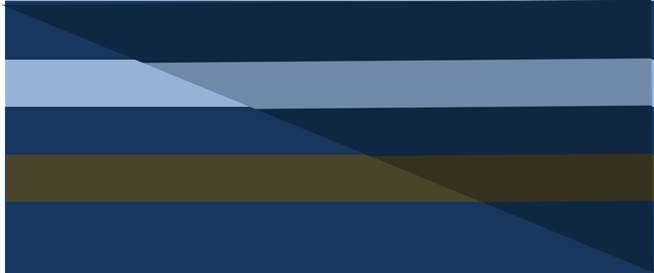
- Colour
- Website: abbeyfealecollege.ie

Coláiste Íde agus Iosef (colloquially referred to as CII) is a public secondary school in Abbeyfeale, County Limerick, Ireland. It was founded as a community college in 2011 and its catchment area covers County Limerick and partly extends into County Kerry and County Cork. The school is under the trusteeship of the Limerick and Clare Education and Training Board and the Roman Catholic Diocese of Limerick.

Sports undertaken at the school include association football (soccer), basketball, Gaelic football and hurling.
