= St Govan's Chapel =

Medieval chapel in Pembrokeshire, Wales

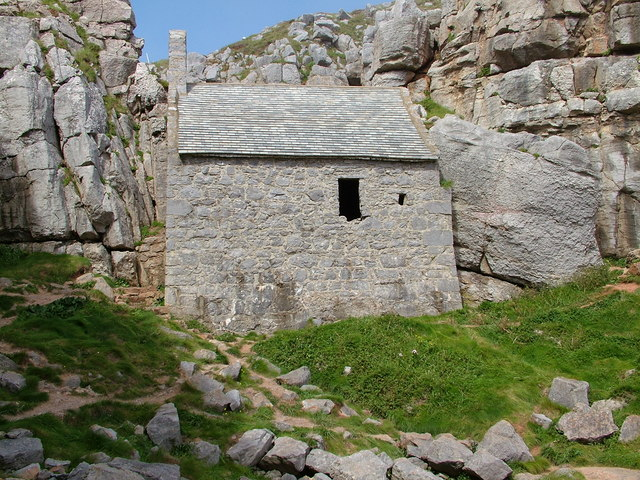

- Location within Pembrokeshire

Religion
- Affiliation: Christianity
- Patron: St Govan

Location
- Location: St Govan's Head, Pembrokeshire, Wales
- Coordinates: 51.5987°N 4.9368°W

Architecture
- Completed: 13th century
- Listed Building – Grade I
- Official name: St. Govan's Chapel
- Designated: 8 February 1996
- Reference no.: 17980

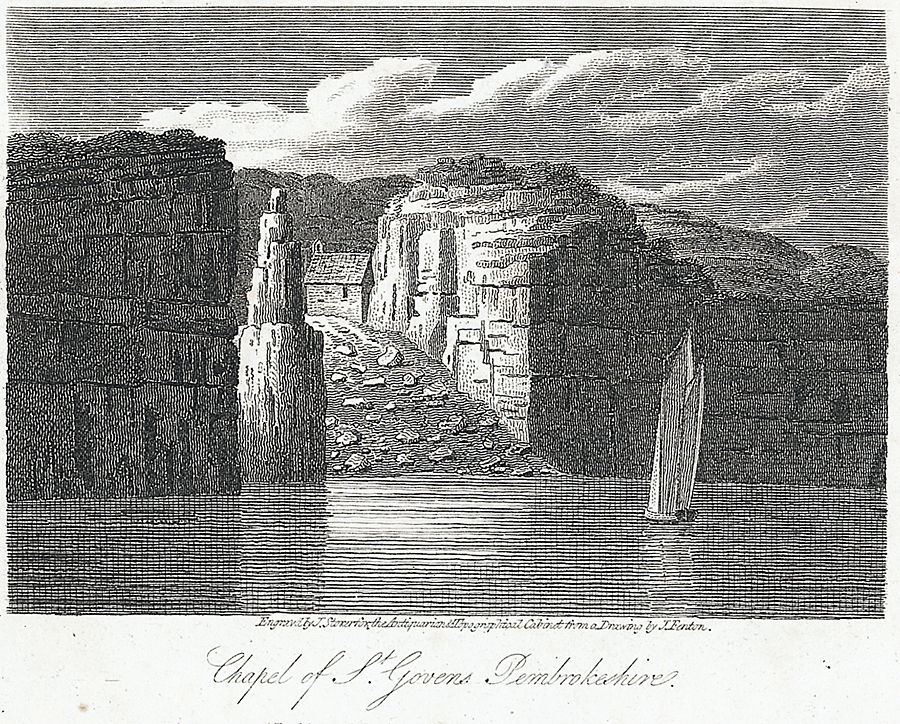
Engraving of St Govan's Chapel (1810)

St Govan's Chapel is a chapel located at St Govan's Head, Pembrokeshire in south west Wales.

Built into the side of a limestone cliff, the building measures 20 by 12 feet (6.1 m × 3.7 m) with walls constructed from limestone, and consists of two chambers, one in the front and one in the back. The majority of the chapel was built in the thirteenth century, although parts of it may date back further to the sixth century when Saint Govan, a monk, moved into a cave located on the site of the chapel. One legend suggests that Saint Govan is buried underneath the chapel's altar, located at the east end of the building. The entrance to the building is via a doorway on the north side, low stone benches run along the north and south walls and an empty bell-cote is located at the west end. The slate roof is suspected to be a modern addition compared to the rest of the building.

The building is accessible from the clifftop by climbing down a set of 52 steps, although tourist organisations propagate the legend that when counted, the number of steps differs between going down and going back up.

The building was listed with Grade I status on 8 February 1996. The chapel is within the Castlemartin Military Training Area and is sometimes inaccessible because of military activity.

The chapel was used as a location in episodes 1–3 of the third series of the BBC drama His Dark Materials.

== Ogof Gofan ==
Under the chapel is a huge cave system, Ogof Gofan, containing a "cathedral-like structure", accessible only by abseiling down the cliff. The cave was re-discovered in 1966, but it had been used by people for thousands of years, from when the sea was miles from the cave mouth.
