= Saint Gobain =

Personal life
- Born: Ireland
- Died: 670
- Cause of death: marauders (brother)
- Resting place: buried in his oratory
- Other name: Goban
- Relatives: brother of Saint Wasnon

Religious life
- Religion: Christianity

Senior posting
- Based in: Burgh Castle Norfolk, England and France
- Disciple of: Saint Fursey

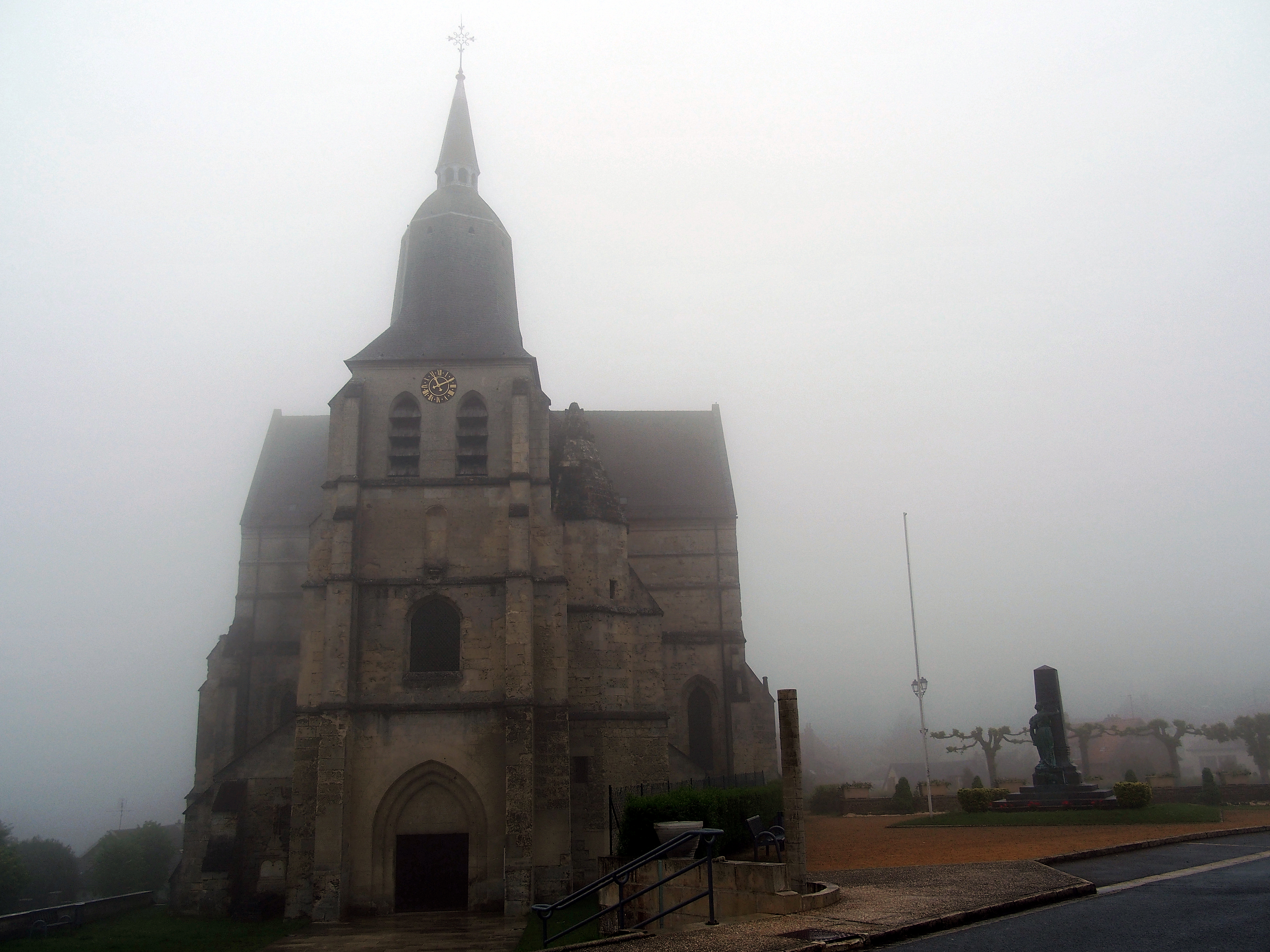
Church of Saint-Gobain, Aisne

Saint Gobain (died 670), also known as Goban, was an Irish monk and spiritual student of Saint Fursey at Burgh Castle, Norfolk, England.

Born in Ireland, he was a brother of Saint Wasnon, (to whom a church is dedicated in Condé-sur-l'Escaut). Gobain accompanied Fursey to France. Some accounts have him staying at the Abbey of Saint Vincent in Picardy, or the abbey of Corbény in Champagne, before settling in a hermitage in the forest of Voas, near the present Saint-Gobain. There he brought forth a spring by thrusting his pilgrim's staff into the ground.

In 670, Gobain was beheaded by marauders, and buried in his oratory, which became a place of pilgrimage. His feast day is observed on 20 June.

== See also ==
- Saint Goban
- Saint Gobban
- Saint Gobhan
- Saint Govan
