= Rockchapel =

Village in County Cork, Ireland

Rockchapel Séipéal na Carraige
- Village
- Location in Ireland
- Coordinates: 52°17′21″N 09°08′37″W
- Country: Ireland
- Province: Munster
- County: County Cork
- Time zone: UTC+0 (WET)
  - Summer (DST): UTC+1 (IST (WEST))
- Irish Grid Reference: R219159

Rockchapel (Irish: Séipéal na Carraige, meaning 'chapel of the rocks') is a village in north County Cork in Ireland. It is located near the border of counties Cork, Kerry and Limerick. Rockchapel is within the Dáil constituency of Cork North-West.

Much of the land close to the village is planted with coniferous trees, mainly of lodgepole pine and Sitka spruce. This was largely facilitated by financial funding from the national forestry company Coillte through its grant support scheme. The local GAA club is Rockchapel GAA which fields Gaelic football teams in Duhallow division competitions.

The local church is dedicated to Saint Peter and was built c. 1830. Rockchapel forms half a parish in the Roman Catholic Diocese of Cloyne, the other half of the parish being Meelin.

The village got its name from the penal times when Catholic religious services were banned. Mass was said on a rock in a remote area.

Rockchapel has two pubs, one shop, a community centre, a church, a funeral home and a graveyard. As of 2018, the local national (primary) school had 41 pupils enrolled.

The headwaters of the River Feale rise approximately 4.3 km northeast of the village between the townlands of Rockhill West, Rockhill East and Tooreenmacauliffe on the southwestern slopes of Mullaghareirk mountain.

== See also ==
- List of towns and villages in Ireland
