= Liam Boyle Snr =

Irish hurler

Liam Boyle
Personal information
- Born: Ballyduff, County Kerry

Sport
- Sport: Hurling
- Position: 11
Club
- Years: Club
- Ballyduff Causeway
Club titles
- Kerry titles: 2
Inter-county
- Years: County
- Kerry
Inter-county titles
- Munster titles: 0
- All-Irelands: 0

Liam Boyle is a hurler who played for Ballyduff. His family are a well-known sporting family in North Kerry, and his sons have played both football and hurling with Kerry. His son Mikey Boyle was captain of the Kerry county team that won the 2011 Christy Ring Cup.

He had a successful club career with Ballyduff. He won 11 Kerry Senior Hurling Championship 1973, 1976, 1977, 1978, 1984, 1988, 1989, 1991, 1993, 1994 and 1995. He was captain of the 1977 team. He played in the goal in the 1995 win, with his sons Colm and Kenneth outfield. He also played with Causeway for a time.
