= Saint Govan =

6th-century Welsh saint

Coordinates: 51.59870°N 4.93685°W

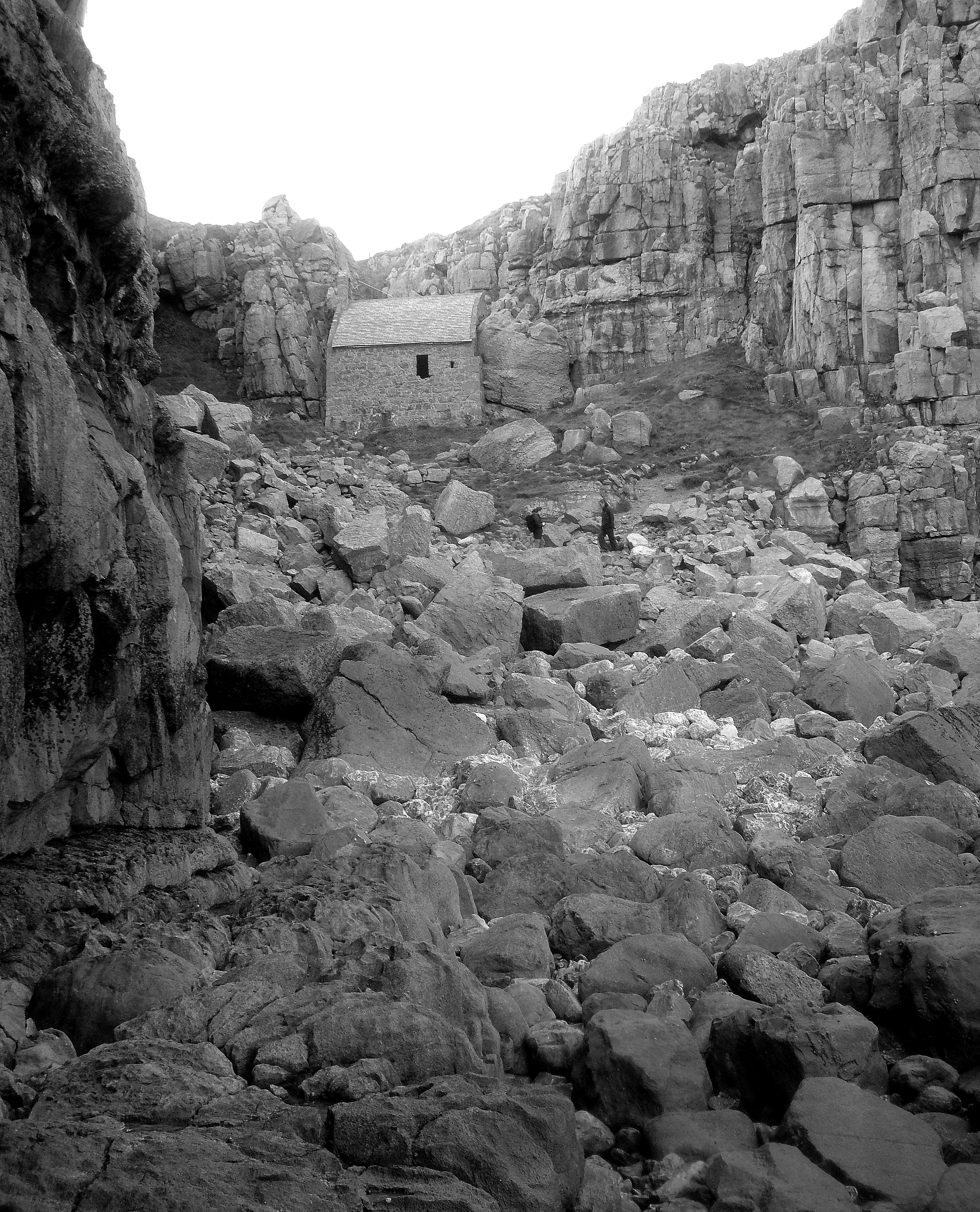
- St Govan's Chapel, Pembrokeshire, built above the hermitage cell in the 13th century.
- Born: c. 500 AD; County Wexford, Ireland
- Died: 586 AD; St Govan's Chapel, Pembrokeshire
- Venerated in: Celtic Christianity; Eastern Orthodox Christianity
- Feast: 26 March (8 April Old style)
- Attributes: Celtic Rite

Saint Govan (Welsh: Gofan; died 586) was a hermit who lived in a fissure on the side of coastal cliff near Bosherston, in the Pembrokeshire Coast National Park, Wales. St Govan's Chapel was built in the fissure in the 13th century on what is now known as St Govan's Head.

== Legends ==
One story says Govan was an Irish monk who travelled to Wales late in life to seek the friends and family of the abbot who had trained him, variously identified as Saint David or Saint Ailbe of Emly. Another story identifies Govan with Gawain, one of King Arthur's Knights of the Round Table. In traditional Welsh, the name "Govan" means "Legendary Son of Caw". Caw – or Hueil mab Caw – was a Pictish rival of King Arthur. In other legends he is a thief.

Govan was set upon by pirates, from Ireland or the nearby Lundy Island. The cliff opened up and left a fissure just big enough for him to hide in until the pirates left. In gratitude, he decided to stay on along the cliff, probably to help warn the locals of the impending pirate attack if they were to return.

Govan lived within a small cave in the fissure of the cliff. This is now reached by a long flight of stone steps, the number of which is said to vary depending on whether one is ascending or descending.

The present small vaulted chapel of local limestone was built over the cave and dates from the 13th century although the site may have been of monastic importance since the 5th century. Saint Govan may be identified with Sir Gawain, one of King Arthur's knights, who entered into a state of retreat in his later years.

Originally, Govan caught fish and took water from two nearby springs. Both are now dry; one was where the medieval chapel now stands, the other, which was lower down the cliff, later became a holy well. A legend says that Saint Govan's handprints are imprinted on the floor of his cave and that his body is buried under the chapel's altar. The cave was once a popular place for making wishes.

=== The Bell Rock ===
Another legend regarding Saint Govan concerns his silver bell. He is supposed to have kept the bell in the tower of the chapel. When the bell pealed, its sound was of perfect tone and clarity. But pirates who heard the sound left Saint Govan desolate when they stole the bell. Angels flew in and took it from the pirates and returned it to the hermit. To stop the pirates returning and taking it again, the angels encased the bell in a huge stone, that is, the Bell Rock which is found at the water's edge. The legend said that when Saint Govan "rang" the stone, its vigour had become a thousand times stronger.

== See also ==
- St Govan's Church, Llangovan
- Saint Goban
- Saint Gobhan
- Saint Gobain
- Saint Gobban
