= William Casey (priest) =

Rev. William Casey (1844–1907) was a Catholic priest and leading member of the Irish National Land League.

== Biography ==
William Casey was born at Kilbeheny, Mitchelstown, County Cork, in 1844 and was educated briefly at Mount Melleray and then at St Colman's College, Fermoy, before going to St Patrick's, Carlow College to train for the Catholic priesthood. He was ordained to the priesthood on 2 July 1868 for the Diocese of Limerick and served as curate in a number of parishes before being appointed to Abbeyfeale in 1871. He was stationed there until his death.

On 29 September 1879, a few days before rents became due to the local landlord, he spoke at a meeting held in the Square of Abbeyfeale and soon emerged as the local leader of the Land movement. A series of bad harvests had put the local tenant farmers into a situation whereby paying rents was not possible. Fr Casey attempted to negotiate a rent reduction but this was not agreed and local farmers who did not pay the full amount mount were evicted. Fr Casey arranged housing for the families.

Fr Casey intervened in several cases attempting to assist people who had been evicted. Apart from attending to their spiritual needs as their priest he also built a community hall and formed local organisations for sports and leisure especially the local GAA club that was named after him, Father Casey's GAA.

== Death and legacy ==
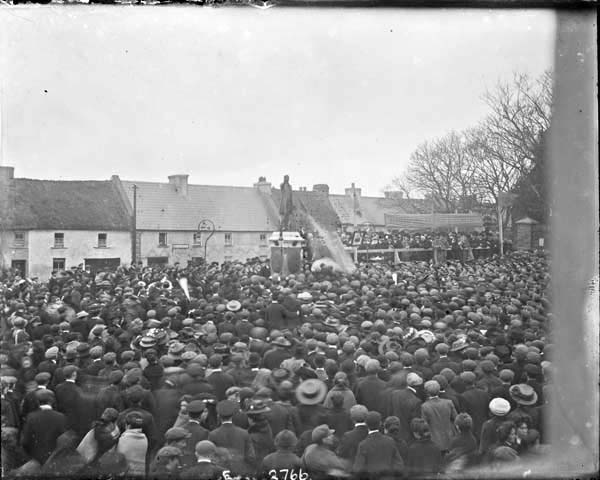
Unveiling of the statue of Fr Casey

He died on 29 December 1907 and a large crowd attended his funeral. A statue of him was later erected in the square of Abbeyfeale and unveiled by John Tuohill Murphy.

An oval historical marker in his honor is located at Abbeyfeale, Ireland.
