= Mullaghareirk Mountains =

Mountain range in southwestern Ireland

- Mullach an Radhairc
- Location within Ireland

Highest point
- Elevation: 408 m (1,339 ft)
- Coordinates: 52°20′N 9°08′W

Geography
- Country: Ireland
- Provinces of Ireland: Munster

The Mullaghareirk Mountains (from Irish: Mullach an Radhairc, meaning 'the summit of the view') is a range of hills in Ireland on the borders of County Cork, County Kerry and County Limerick. The area is also known as Sliabh Luachra (sometimes anglicised 'Slieve Logher'). The highest point is Baraveha (Barr an Bheithe) at 451 metres (1,480 ft). It is bordered by the Blackwater valley to the south, Castleisland to the west, Athea to the north and the Deel valley to the east. Villages in the hills include Rockchapel, Ballydesmond, Brosna, Gneevgullia, Mountcollins, Newmarket, Meelin and Tournafulla. The Allaughaun River, a tributary of the River Feale, rises at the east end of the range.

== Stack’s to Mullaghareirk Mountains, West Limerick Hills and Mount Eagle SPA ==
The Mullaghareirk Mountains form part of the Stack’s to Mullaghareirk Mountains, West Limerick Hills and Mount Eagle Special Protection Area which, although large areas are under commercial conifer forestry, protects blanket bog, wet heath and dry heath. The area has been designated as a Special Protection Area under the European Union's Birds Directive and was so designated to protect the hen harrier. A survey in 2005 found 45 breeding pairs, representing more than 20% of the total for the whole island of Ireland. Other rare birds found here include breeding short-eared owl, merlin and red grouse, a species which is now listed as endangered in Ireland. The SPA was designated in 2007 and has a total area of 556 square kilometres (215 sq mi).

== History ==
The Mullaghareirk Mountains were used as a sanctuary by the Rockites, the "followers" of the mythical folk hero Captain Rock, in the Agrarian risings of 1821 to 1824, to hide from the authorities.
