= Ronan O'Connor (Ballyduff Gaelic footballer) =

Kerry hurler and Gaelic footballer

Rónán O'Connor
Personal information
- Born: Ballyduff, County Kerry

Sport
- Sport: Hurling
- Position: Back
Club
- Years: Club
- Ballyduff
Club titles
- Kerry titles: 1
Inter-county
| Years | County | Apps (scores) |
| 2007; 2009 | Kerry (F); Kerry (H) | 4 (0-00) |
Inter-county titles
| Munster Titles | 0 | |
| All-Ireland Titles | 0 | |

Rónán O'Connor is a Gaelic footballer and hurler who plays with Ballyduff. He has played Football and Hurling with Kerry and all levels, winning a Munster Minor Football Championship in 1998. He was captain of the Kerry football side in 2005. Also is the current managing director of O'Conner Marketing Specialising in customer acquisitions through B2B and B2C campaigns currently located in two countries Australia and England.
