= Saint-Gobain, Aisne =

Saint-Gobain
- Commune
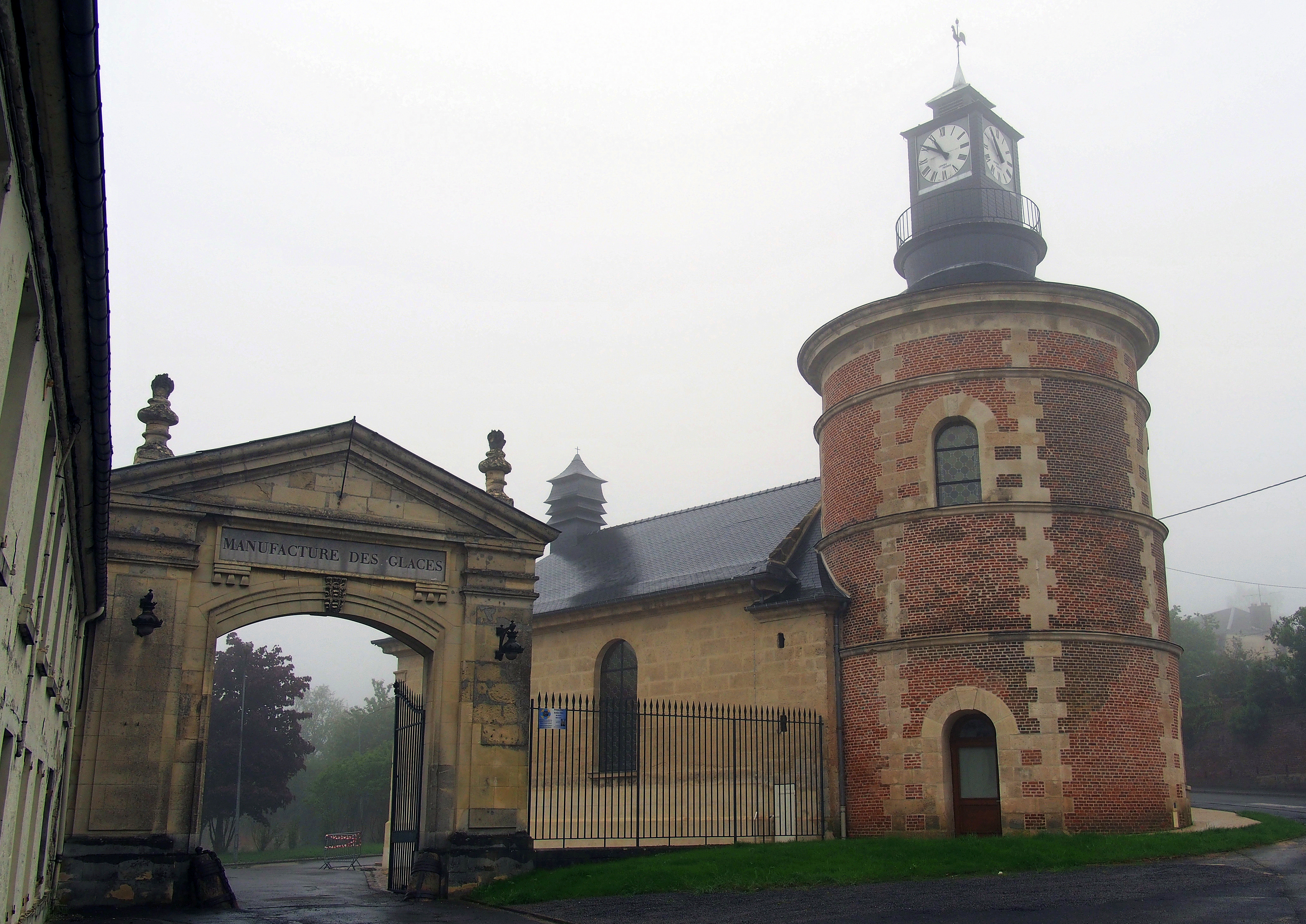
- Former mirror factory

- Coat of arms
- Location of Saint-Gobain
- Location within France Location within Hauts-de-France
- Coordinates: 49°35′48″N 3°22′33″E
- Country: France
- Region: Hauts-de-France
- Department: Aisne
- Arrondissement: Laon
- Canton: Tergnier
- Intercommunality: CA Chauny Tergnier La Fère

Government
  - Mayor (2026–32): Frédéric Mathieu
- Area^{1}: 29.73 km^{2} (11.48 sq mi)
- Elevation: 200 m (660 ft)
- Highest elevation: 207 m (679 ft)
- Lowest elevation: 53 m (174 ft)
- Population (2023): 2,288
  - Density: 76.96/km^{2} (199.3/sq mi)
- Time zone: UTC+01:00 (CET)
  - Summer (DST): UTC+02:00 (CEST)
- INSEE/Postal code: 02680 /02410
- ^{1} French Land Register data, which excludes lakes, ponds, glaciers > 1 km^{2} (0.386 sq mi or 247 acres) and river estuaries.

Saint-Gobain (French pronunciation: [sɛ̃ ɡɔbɛ̃]) is a commune in the Aisne department in Hauts-de-France in northern France.

In 1692, a glass factory was built at the village of Saint-Gobain, giving its name to the Saint-Gobain company.

== Toponymy ==
The settlement, attested as Sanctus Gobanus in 1131, is named after the Irish monk Saint Gobain. Gobanus is a Latinized form of the Celtic personal name Gobanos, meaning 'smith'.

== Population ==
Historical population

Year	Pop.	±% p.a.
1793	2,023	—
1800	2,013	−0.07%
1806	2,119	+0.86%
1821	2,339	+0.66%
1831	2,338	−0.00%
1836	2,378	+0.34%
1841	2,256	−1.05%
1846	2,186	−0.63%
1851	2,210	+0.22%
1856	2,374	+1.44%
1861	2,261	−0.97%
1866	2,190	−0.64%
1872	2,133	−0.44%
1876	2,193	+0.70%
1881	2,120	−0.67%
1886	2,219	+0.92%
1891	2,346	+1.12%
1896	2,147	−1.76%
1901	2,317	+1.54%

Year	Pop.	±% p.a.
1906	2,268	−0.43%
1911	2,305	+0.32%
1921	1,586	−3.67%
1926	2,196	+6.72%
1931	1,976	−2.09%
1936	1,909	−0.69%
1946	2,217	+1.51%
1954	2,535	+1.69%
1962	2,994	+2.10%
1968	2,893	−0.57%
1975	2,657	−1.21%
1982	2,278	−2.17%
1990	2,321	+0.23%
1999	2,340	+0.09%
2007	2,348	+0.04%
2012	2,300	−0.41%
2017	2,282	−0.16%
2023	2,288	+0.04%

Source: EHESS and INSEE (1968-2023)

== See also ==
- Communes of the Aisne department
