= Wasnulf =

Scottish saint (died c. 650)

Saint Wasnulf
- Born: Ireland
- Died: c. 650; Condé-sur-l'Escaut in Hainaut, Austrasia
- Feast: 1 October

Saint Wasnulf (or Vasnolfo, Wasnan, Wasnon, Wasnulphus, Wasnul; died c. 650) was a Scottish (Note: The term "Scottish" in the broader sense refers to the Celtic people of Ireland and Scotland. Hanlon points out that until the middle of the 9th century the British Scots had not yet conquered the Pictish kingdom in what is now Scotland, and few schools of learning. The "Scottish" missionaries such as Wasnulf were almost certainly from Ireland.) missionary in what is now Belgium. His feast day is 1 October.

== Monks of Ramsgate account ==
The Monks of Ramsgate wrote in their Book of Saints (1921),

Wasnulf (Wasnan) (St.) (Oct. 1)
(7th cent.) A Scottish priest who went as a missionary to Hainault (Belgium). He died about A.D. 650, and was buried at Condé.

== Butler's account ==
The hagiographer Alban Butler (1710–1773) wrote in his Lives of the Fathers, Martyrs, and Other Principal Saints under May 26,

Saint Wasnulf, or Wasnon, Patron of Conde, C. The Scots from Ireland and North Britain not content to plant the faith in the isles of Orkney, in the Hebrides or Western islands, and in other neighbouring places, travelled also into remote kingdoms, to carry thither the light of the gospel. Thence came St Mansuetus, the first bishop of Toul in Lorrain, St Rumold, patron of Mechlin, St Colman, M. etc. Several Scottish monasteries were founded in Germany by eminent monks who came from that country, as at Vienna in Austria, at Strasburg, Eichstade, Nuremberg, Constance, Wurtzburg, Erfurth, two at Cologn, and two at Ratisbon. Out of these only three remain at present in the hands of Scottish Benedictin monks, those at Erfuth and Wurtzburg, and that of Saint James at Ratisbon. In the seventh century St Vincent, count of Haynault, invited many holy monks from Ireland and Scotland, then seminaries of saints, into the Netherlands. Among these Saint Wasnulf was the most renowned. He was a Scottish priest and preacher, (not a bishop, as some moderns pretend), and finished his course about the year 651, at Condé, where his body still reposes in a collegiate church endowed with twenty-four canonries. In his apostolical labours he illustrated that country with miracles, says Baldericus, or rather the anonymous author of Chron. Calmer. l.2. c. 42.

== O'Hanlon's account ==
John O'Hanlon (1821–1905) in his Lives of the Irish saints wrote,

Nearly all the ancient writers, who have treated regarding St. Wasnulf, agree that his origin must be traced to the Scotish nation. This is also the statement of Molanus. That Wasnulph was art Irishman by birth is admitted by most writers: and to make this statement more emphatic, the Belgian Martyrologies state, that he came to their country from the seagirt isle of Scotia. Nevertheless, it seems probable enough, that our saint bore a different Celtic name in Ireland, from the one subsequently given him on the Continent, and by which at present he is generally known. According to some accounts, he desired as a pilgrim to leave his natal soil, so that he might serve God in some country unknown to his relatives. The title of bishop, bestowed-on him by several writers, he does not appear to have acquired, either in Ireland or elsewhere. Neither is it clear that he had been ordained priest, before he engaged himself for a foreign missionary career...

This holy man, having left his native country to serve the Almighty, chose the monastic profession as that most congenial to his love of humility and contemplation. The Belgian Martyrologies relate, that St. Wasnulph, coming from the sea-surrounded island of Scotia, settled at the wood or grove of Teroacia or Therascia; and that for a long time he led a holy life in a place afterwards known as cella, or the cell. That village of Therasia was situated in the southern part of the district of Hannonia. At present, it lies to the east of Picardy, and it is known as Tierache, a commune in the province of Hainault, and department of Momigines, Belgium. Wasnulf came to Hannonia, in the Netherlands, in the time of St. Vincent, the governor and count, who received many pious strangers from Ireland with great benignity, especially regarding them as his fellow-countrymen. At first, Wasnulf placed himself under the direction of St. Gislen, and became the companion of his monks, as also an inmate of his monastery. How long he lived there is unknown. According to some accounts, the religious Vincent was then governor of Hannonia, having emigrated from Ireland, and using his influence to spread the Christian faith, throughout that province committed to his care.

We are told, that when our saint left the monastery of Gislen, through angelic guidance, he came to the ancient town of Condate, where a community of holy nuns lived under an abbess, and their patroness was the Blessed Virgin Mary. It seems most likely, that Wasnulf visited Count Vincent, a little before the middle of the seventh century; for, about this period, a great influx of distinguished Irish missionaries was remarked on the European Continent. Formerly a rich and royal city, Conde was situated at the confluence of the rivers Scheld and Hayne, in the old province of Hannonia, or Hainault. ... This holy bishop preached the gospel there with great zeal. The functions of a bishop are said to have been exercised by St. Wasnulf at Conde. Over this church he probably ruled, and there he lived in the exercise of rare virtues to the day of his death; however, there appears to be no reliable evidence, that he had ever attained episcopal rank. Wasnulph flourished about the year 651, but the exact period for his decease is not known. This saint is said to have died at Conde, and according to Castellan about the year 700. Father Stilting places little reliance on the statement of the ancient writer of the Life of St. Vincent, Count of Hannonia, regarding the holy men who are said there to have been his contemporaries, and some of whom are known to have lived long after his time. Wherefore, he thinks it may be supposed in a general way, that Wasnulph died in the seventh or eight century.

== Sources ==
- Butler, Alban (1799), The Lives of the Primitive Fathers, Martyrs, and Other Principal Saints, J. Moir This article incorporates text from this source, which is in the public domain.
- O'Hanlon, John (1875), Lives of the Irish saints, vol. 10, Dublin: Duffy & Co. This article incorporates text from this source, which is in the public domain.
- St. Augustine's Abbey, Ramsgate (1921). The Book of saints : a dictionary of servants of God canonized by the Catholic Church. London: A. & C. Black, ltd. OCLC 671676136. This article incorporates text from this source, which is in the public domain.
