= Saint Goban =

Saint Goban, Saint Gobban, or Saint Gobhan is the name of various saints of early Christian Ireland. The ecclesiastical integrity and merit of the saint(s) is often debased by confusing, composite attempted biographies.

== Gobban ==
The name "Saint Gobban" occurs much more frequently in biographies and hagiographies than "Saint Goban". Saint Gobban can be further linked to St Laserian's Cathedral, Old Leighlin, and to Killamery: Cell Lamraidhe which would help identify this saint as Gobban Find mac Lugdach – alternatively anglicized as Saint Gobhan.

Additionally, "Saint Gobban" has been associated with the following places:

- Old Leighlin: seanleithglinn County Carlow
- Killamery: Cell Lamraidhe County Kilkenny
- Seagoe: teg-da-goba. County Armagh.

== Gobanus – Gobban-Goba ==
The distinguished Irish Church historian John Lanigan states – "Gobanus – Goba of Teg da-goba – Seagoe, on the bank of the Bann in Iveagh of Ulidia (also) St. Gobanus of Killamery, near the mountain called Slievenaman." Lanigan clearly states that he believes the Gobanus (Latin) – Saint Gobban of Killamery is the same historical person as Saint Gobhan of Seagoe, who is identified as Gobban Find mac Lugdach.

== Gobans without attribution ==
That there existed in the early history of Ireland another Saint Goban / Gobban is undeniable. The Kinsale area of County Cork lays claim to a Saint Goban / Gobban, as does County Antrim; however without proper research and attribution any attempt to properly identify may only add confusion and detract from known facts.

== See also ==
- Gobán Saor
- Saint Gobain
- Saint Govan
