= Ballyduff, County Kerry =

Village in County Kerry, Ireland

Ballyduff An Baile Dubh
- Village
- Location in Ireland
- Coordinates: 52°27′11″N 9°39′47″W
- Country: Ireland
- Province: Munster
- County: County Kerry

Population (2022)
  - Total: 447
- Time zone: UTC+0 (WET)
  - Summer (DST): UTC-1 (IST (WEST))
- Irish Grid Reference: R746888

Ballyduff (Irish: An Baile Dubh, meaning 'the black town') is a village near Listowel, County Kerry, Ireland. Located on the R551 road between Ballyheigue and Ballybunion on hills above Cashen Bay where the River Feale flows to the sea at the mouth of the River Shannon.

== History ==
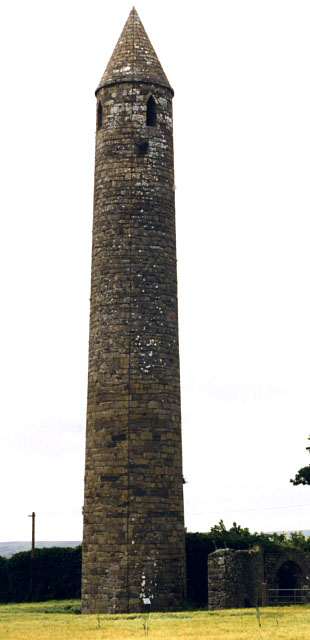
Rattoo round tower

Near Ballyduff at Rattoo, a round tower reaches a height of 29.56m, with a base circumference of 15m.

This is the only complete round tower in Kerry, and has been dated to the late 11th century. In the mid-19th century, the tower sat on a raised earth causeway in what was then a swamp. The swamp was drained and the causeway removed in the late 19th century so the fields could be cultivated.

On 1 November 1920, in reprisals for the killings and shootings of various RIC constables in the area, the Black and Tans shot a local man (John Houlihan) dead, burned the local creamery to the ground, and then burned seven homes in the Abbeydorney area.

Of the area's three great houses, only two are still standing, Rattoo Great House and Bushmount House. Ballyhorgan House was burned in 1920 in disputed circumstances. There is a soup kitchen that was used during the Great Famine (1845–1847). There is a forge that was recently renovated.

== Sport ==
Ballyduff GAA club plays both Gaelic football and hurling. The club won the All-Ireland Senior Hurling Championship final in 1891, when the team was trained by James McDonnell. This is the only time that the title was won by a Kerry team.

Ballyduff is also home to the soccer team Rattoo Rovers who play in the Kerry District League.

== Notable people ==
- Liam Boyle Snr, former Ballyduff hurler
- Ronan O'Connor, Ballyduff Gaelic footballer

== See also ==
- List of abbeys and priories in Ireland (County Kerry)
- List of towns and villages in Ireland
