= River Feale =

River in southwestern Ireland, flowing to the Shannon Estuary

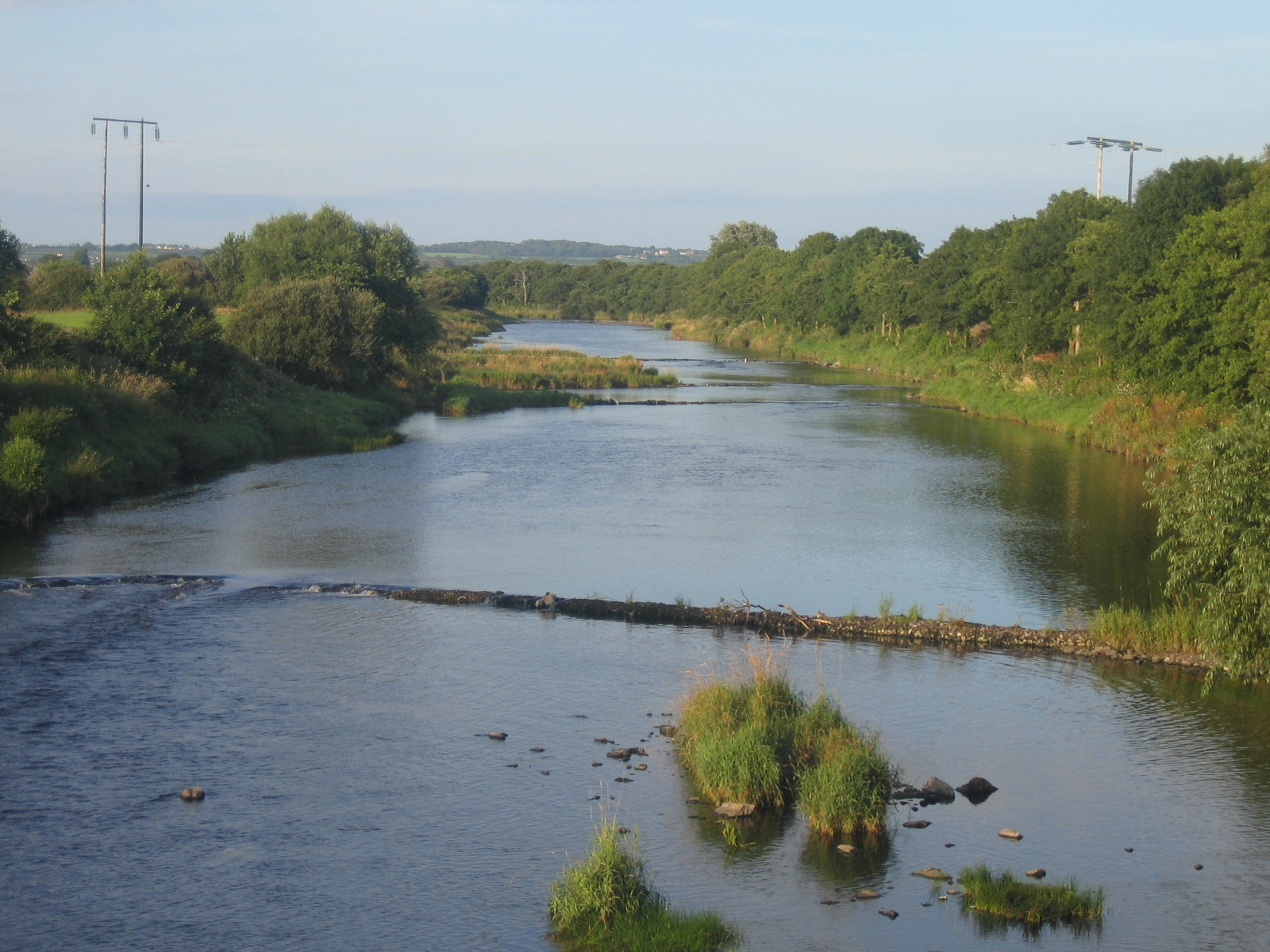
- River Feale at Finuge Crossing, County Kerry
- Etymology: Fial, a mythical woman
- Native name: Abhainn na Féile (Irish)

Location
- Country: Ireland
- Counties: Cork, Limerick, Kerry
- Towns: Abbeyfeale, Listowel

Physical characteristics
- Source: Mullaghareirk Mountains
  - location: County Cork
- Mouth: Shannon Estuary
  - location: Ballyduff, County Kerry
  - coordinates: 52.48294°N 9.68903°W
- Length: 75 km (47 mi)
- Basin size: 445.2 mi^{2} (1,153 km^{2})
- Discharge
  - average: 34.6 m^{3}/s (1,220 cu ft/s)

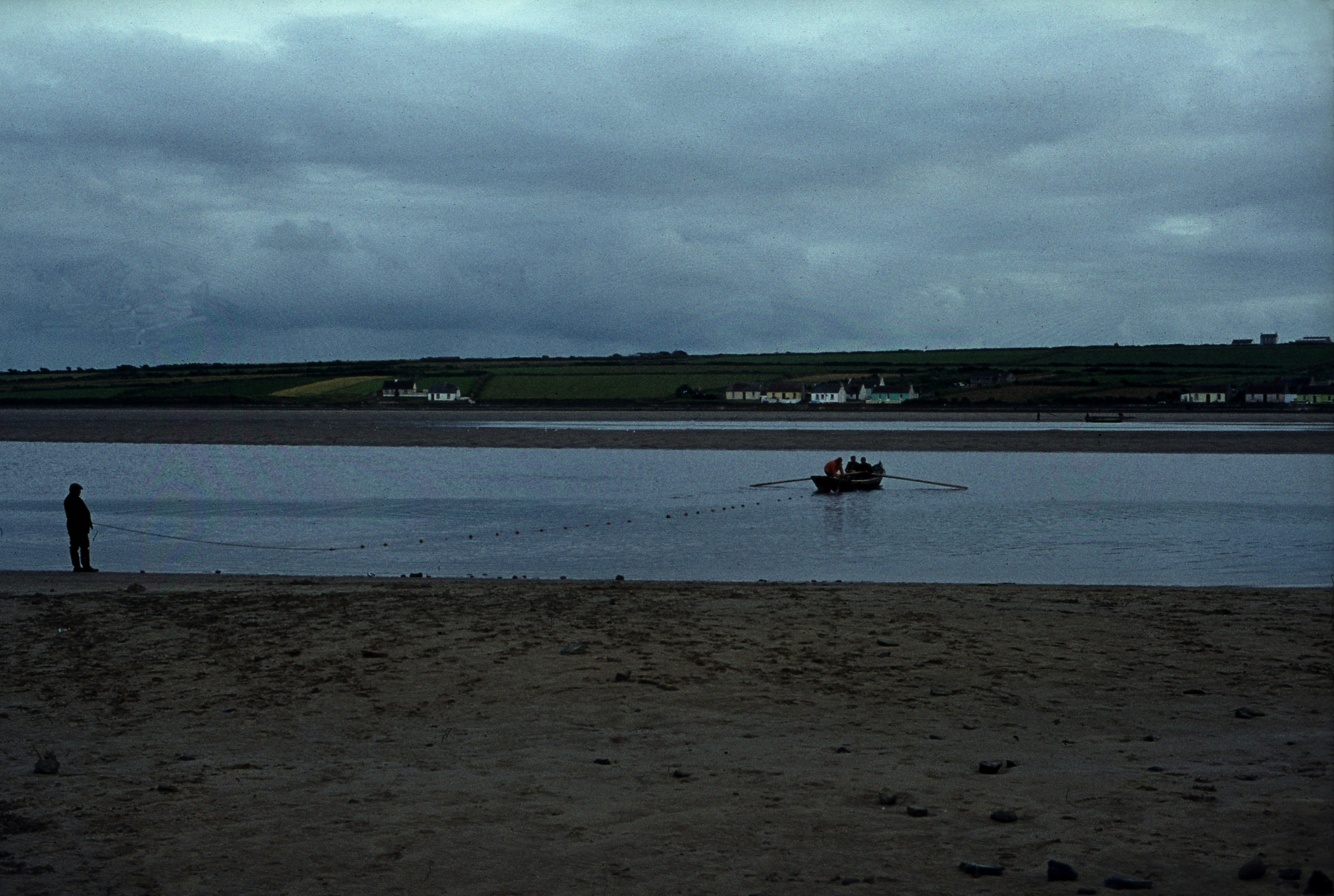
Image of beach fishing for salmon in the River Feale near the town of Ballybunion in 1975.

The River Feale (An Fhéil or Abhainn na Féile in Irish) rises near Rockchapel in the Mullaghareirk Mountains of County Cork in the southwest of Ireland and flows northwestwards for 75 kilometres through Mountcollins and Abbeyfeale in County Limerick and Listowel in County Kerry before finally emptying into Cashen Bay, a wide estuary north of Ballyduff. It merges into the River Shannon's estuary, which joins with the Atlantic Ocean with a flow rate of 34.6 m^{2}/s. The river, along with its tributaries, combine to add to over 160 km (100 miles) of waterways. For the final 10 km (6 miles) stretch it is also known as the Cashen River. The river contains a large salmon and sea trout population.

The headwaters of the Feale rise approximately 4.3 km northeast of the village of Rockchapel between the townlands of Rockhill West, Rockhill East and Tooreenmacauliffe on the southwestern slopes of Mullaghareirk mountain. For 65 kilometers the Feale flows through County Kerry, or forms part of its boundary, which makes it the longest river flowing through Kerry.

== Name ==
According to Geoffrey Keating's Foras Feasa ar Éirinn (compiled in the 1630s), the river takes its name from a legendary woman:

Fuair Fial bean Lughaidh mic Íotha bás do náire ar bhfaicsin a nochta da céile ar dteacht ó shnámh dhi; gonadh uaithe ghairmthear Innbhear Féile don abhainn sin ó shoin i le
Fial wife of Lughaidh son of Ioth died of shame on her husband seeing her naked as she returned from swimming; and from her that river has ever since been called Innbhear Feile

— Foras Feasa ar Éirinn, part 22

In County Limerick and north Kerry, the Feale is also referred to as one of the Three Sisters. These are three rivers which all rise close to each other in the Mullaghareirk mountains in north County Cork and generally flow north or northwest into the Shannon Estuary (the others being the rivers Maigue and Deel). This term is not to be confused with three of Ireland's larger rivers, the Nore, the Suir and the Barrow, which are also collectively referred to as The Three Sisters.

== See also ==
- Rivers of Ireland
- Shannon River Basin
