= Cashen Bay =

Bay in County Kerry, Ireland

Coordinates: 52.488°N 9.695°W

Cashen Bay is located on the estuary of the River Feale in County Kerry, Ireland. The village of Ballyduff overlooks the bay. It has been a minor harbour for many centuries.

A small number of inhabitants live the area called "The Cashen". A long seawall, up to 7 feet high in places, protects the shoreline community at both sides of the "mouth" of the River Feale.

Ballybunion Golf Course is located on the north side of the Cashen Bay. A salmon fishery is also located on the bay's north side.
