= Gobán Saor =

Legendary Irish architect

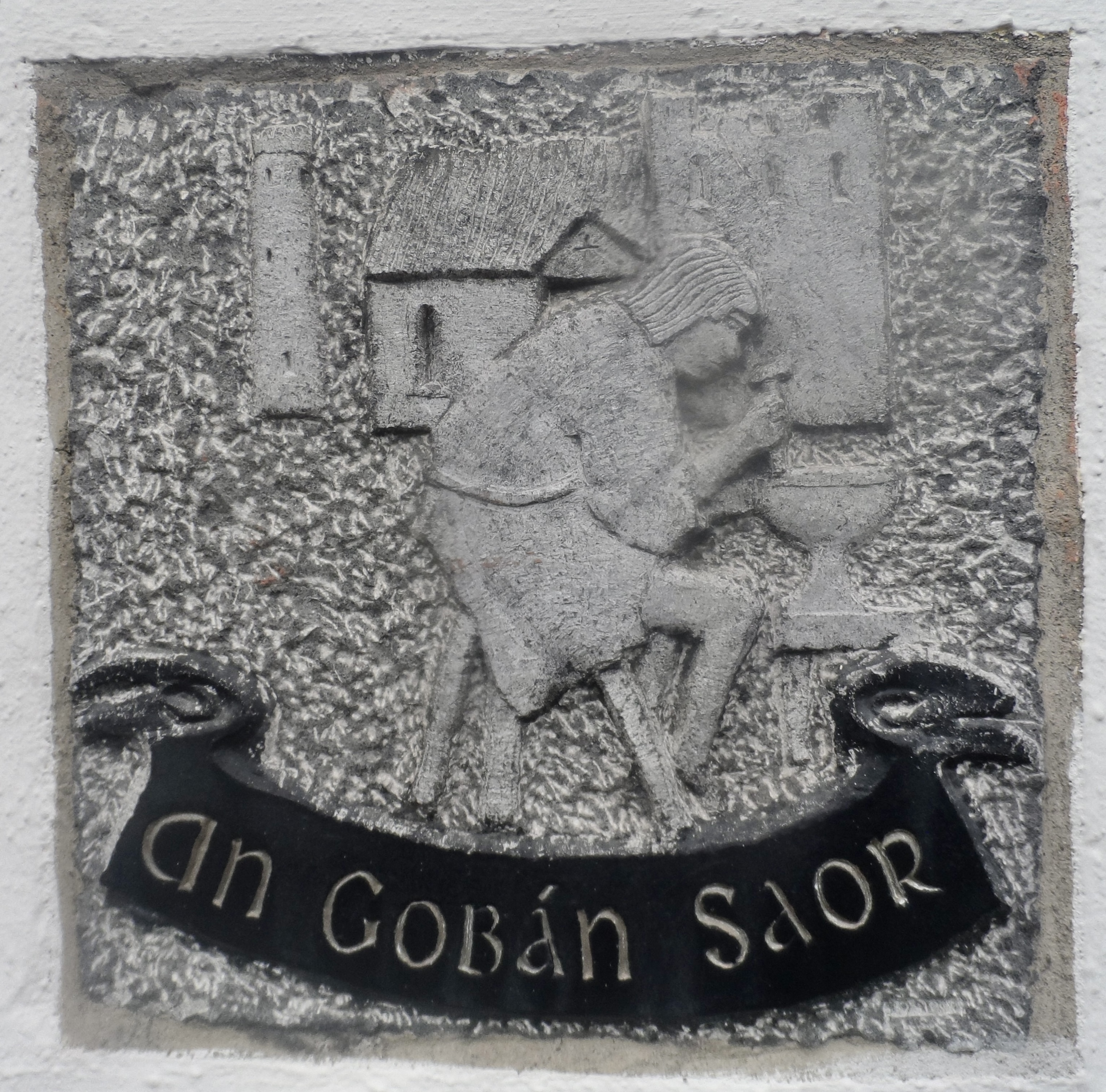
Stone carving of the Gobán Saor

The Gobán Saor was a highly skilled smith or architect in Irish history and legend. Gobban Saer (Gobban the Builder) is a figure regarded in Irish traditional lore as an architect of the seventh century, and popularly canonized as Saint Gobban. The Catholic Encyclopedia considers him historical and born at Turvey, on the Donabate peninsula in North County Dublin, about 560.

In literary references, he was employed by many Irish saints to build churches, oratories, and bell towers, and he is alluded to in an eighth-century Irish poem, preserved in a monastery in Carinthia. In the "Life of St. Abban" it is said that "the fame of Gobban as a builder in wood as well as stone would exist in Ireland to the end of time."

In Gobán Saor can be seen elements of Goibniu, the Old Irish god of smithcraft. His name can be compared with the Old Irish gobae ~ gobann ‘smith’, Middle Welsh gof ~ gofein ‘smith,’ Gallic gobedbi ‘with the smiths’, Latin faber ‘smith’ and with the Lithuanian gabija ‘sacred home fire’ and Lithuanian gabus ‘gifted, clever’.

The Wonder Smith and His Son is a retelling of fourteen tales about the Gobán Saor, by Ella Young; illustrated by Boris Artzybasheff (1927). It was a 1928 Newbery Honor Book. Two of Ella Young's retellings were reprinted by Collier in "The Young Folks Shelf of Books".

The Goban Saor is described as the son of Tuirbe Tragmar ('thrower of axes'), a figure whose magical axe would hold back the sea after it was thrown on the strand.

His supposed burial site is located next to Derrynaflan Church, County Tipperary.
