= Saint Amaro =

Abbot and sailor

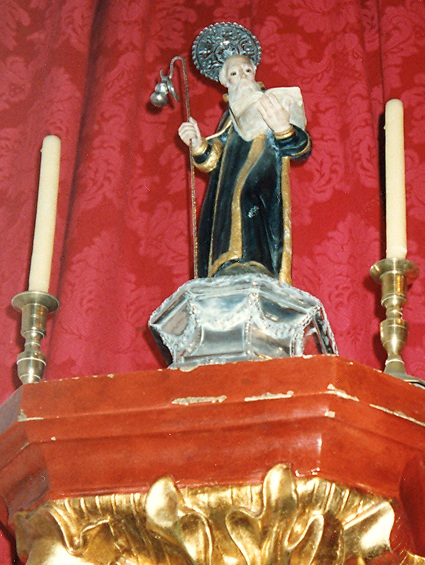
- Statue of Saint Amaro. Ermita de San Amaro, Puerto de la Cruz.
- Venerated in: Roman Catholic Church
- Feast: 15 January
- Attributes: pilgrim’s staff
- Patronage: Disabled people

According to Catholic tradition, Saint Amaro or Amarus the Pilgrim (Spanish: San Amaro, Portuguese: Santo Amaro, Galician: Santo Amaro) was an abbot and sailor who it was claimed sailed across the Atlantic Ocean to an earthly paradise. There are two historical figures who may have provided the basis for this legend. The first was a French penitent of the same name who went on a pilgrimage to Santiago de Compostela in the thirteenth century. On his return journey, he established himself at Burgos, where he founded a hospital for lepers.

Saint Amaro has also been identified with Saint Maurus, disciple of Saint Benedict, who founded the first Benedictine monastery in France.

Around the historical character of Saint Amaro converged many pagan traditions present in Asturias and Galicia related with Gaelic immrama and echtrai, like The Voyage of Máel Dúin, The Voyage of the Uí Chorra, The Voyage of Snedgus and Mac Riagla or The Voyage of Bran. Many features of the Celtic Otherworld are present in the Periplus of Saint Amaro.

== The Periplus of Amaro ==
Like Saint Brendan, Amaro is said to have travelled on a journey that echoes that of the Irish immram – the voyages to the paradisiacal islands of the West. An edition of the Life of Saint Amaro was published at Burgos in 1552.

His legend holds that Amaro was a noble Catholic from Asia who was obsessed with the idea of visiting the earthly paradise. With this goal in mind, he would inquire for more information from his guests. Amaro was not successful in receiving information from them and was quite desperate and anguished about this until one night, God appeared to him and revealed how to reach his objective. Amaro would have to build a boat and follow the path of the sun across the Atlantic Ocean.

Amaro took to the sea with some companions and sailed for six days and seven nights until he reached an island. This was an extremely fertile land that held five cities inhabited by uncouth men – though the women were quite beautiful.

Amaro spent six months there until he heard a voice in his dreams telling him to depart the island. Amaro sailed through the "Red Sea" until he reached the land of a beautiful fountain, where the people were beautiful and lived peaceful lives that lasted three hundred years. Amaro remained there for three weeks until an old woman advised that he leave the island before he became accustomed to the good life.

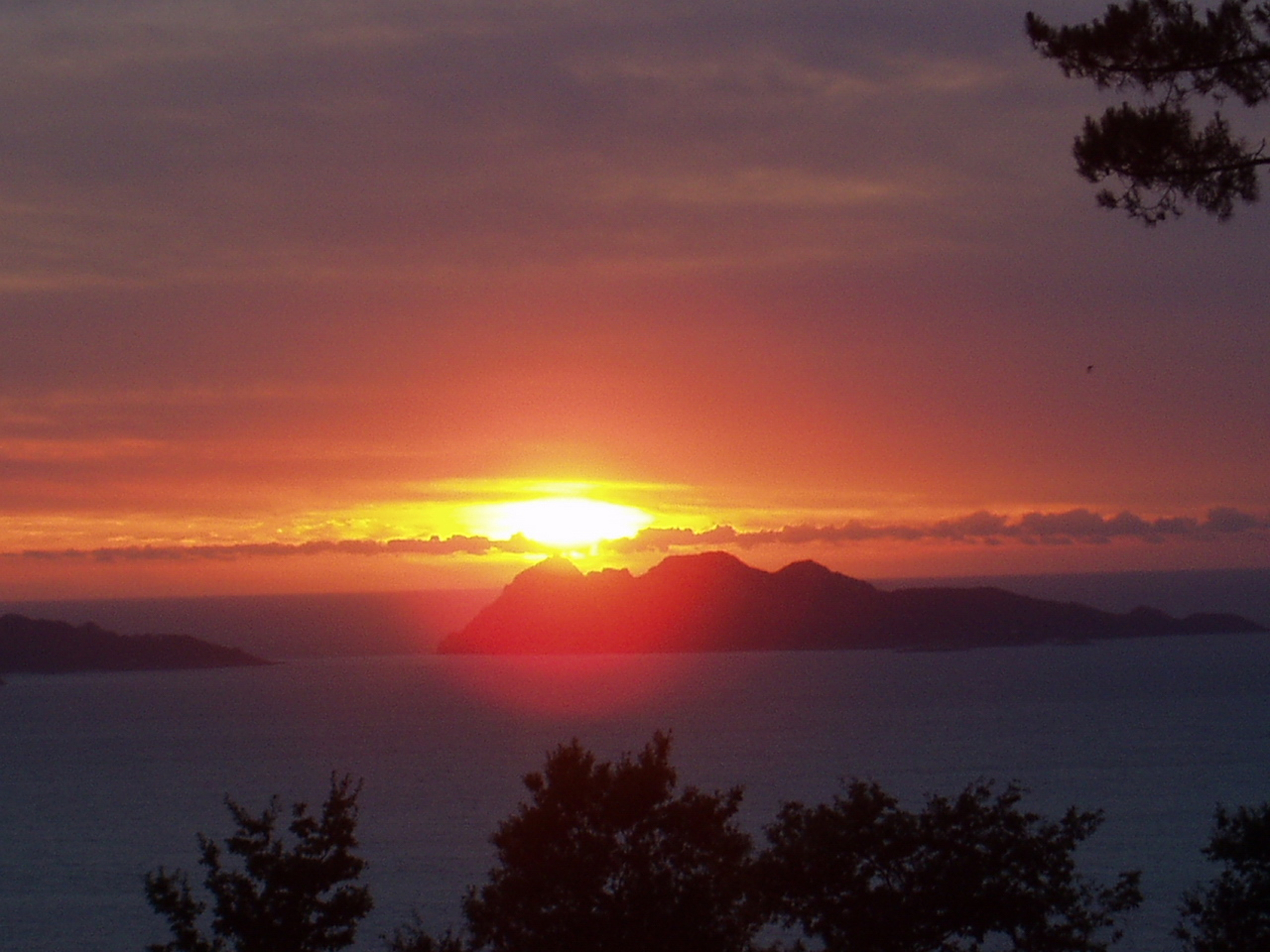
Sunset in the Western Galicia coast.

They sailed for a long time into the vast unknown until they saw several vessels that they thought could assist them. Unfortunately, they found that these vessels had been invaded by monsters, which had killed the sailors and taken their bodies down to the depths of the ocean. Amaro was rescued by an apparition of a group of women, who advised him to empty his bottles of wine and oil into the sea, and then fill the bottles with air. Amaro did this and was rescued from this "Mar Cuajado" (lit. "Still Sea"; the Doldrums).

Three days later they arrived at another desert island, which was inhabited by savage beasts hostile to man. There they found a hermit who informed them that the beasts there annihilated themselves by fighting one another on the day of Saint John; the stench of the corpses persisted throughout the year. The hermit provided them with supplies and recommended that they sail East, where there was a beautiful land that would satisfy all of their needs.

They sailed the next day and arrived in the afternoon, finding a monastery named Valdeflores. A monk from this monastery, Leonites, greeted them and told Amaro that he was waiting for him: he was already informed of their arrival by means of a vision. Leonites provided Amaro with instructions on how to reach the Earthly Paradise.

With Leonites, Amaro and his companions arrived at a natural harbor where they remained for a month, after which they traveled to an extensive and rugged valley, where Amaro will find what he was looking for: the Earthly Paradise. First, however, Amaro stumbled upon a nunnery situated high upon a mountaintop called Flor de Dueñas (Flower of Ladies).

He remained there, receiving further instructions on how to reach Paradise from a holy woman named Baralides. He is presented with a white habit. This is given to him by Brígida (Bridget), the niece of Baralides who lives in Paradise. Unfortunately, Leonites began to cry: he is losing a dear friend. But Baralides appears, and comforts Leonites with a gift. She presents him with a branch of one of the two magical trees of the Earthly Paradise.

== Amaro in Paradise ==
In Paradise, Amaro found an enormous castle built from gems and precious metals, with battlements of gold and towers of rubies, walls made with multicolored bricks.

The castle's gatekeeper informed Amaro that the castle was the Earthly Paradise, and thus no living being can enter it. The saint begged the gatekeeper to allow him to look at Paradise through the keyhole. Amaro was allowed to do this, and saw many things, including the tree of life from which Adam ate; a primeval and eternal garden; enormous trees; birds whose song was so beautiful one could remain entranced by it for a thousand years; young musicians playing strange and unknown musical instruments; beautiful ladies adorned with a crown of flowers and dressed in white; the Virgin Mary, who accompanied these young ladies.

Saint Amaro begged to be allowed in; the gatekeeper refused and informed him that during the saint's viewing of Paradise, three hundred years have passed. Amaro returned to the coast to find his companions gone and a city named after him built there.

Amaro told the city's inhabitants his story and they built him a house alongside the monastery of Valdeflores, where he lived for a number of years until he died. He was buried alongside Baralides and Brígida.

== Veneration ==
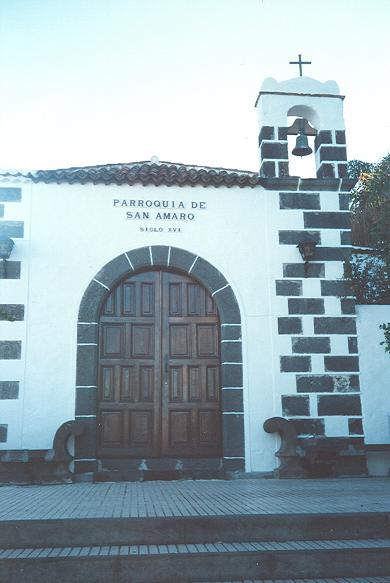
Ermita de San Amaro, Puerto de la Cruz.

There are a number of hermitages dedicated to Amaro in Spain. There is a hermitage dedicated to Amaro in Puerto de la Cruz, Tenerife (Ermita de San Amaro). The town of San Amaro in Ourense province is named after him. The church in Albos, Verea, in Spain is named after him and he is venerated by the residents of Albos, Cardeo, Cigarrosa and Cubreiros. A feast on his honor is celebrated there on or about January 15th.

His cult was also diffused in Portugal, where he is called Santo Amaro. In the districts of Coimbra and Viseu, Saint Amaro is brought pinecones, nuts, and dry figs as an ex-voto offering — but he only accepts these items if they have been stolen. Saint Matthew, Saint Simon, and Saint Bartholomew are also brought things that have been stolen. He is also venerated with an annual religious festival in the parish of Ponta Delgada.

At Beja, the whitewashed church of Santo Amaro is one of just four pre-Romanesque churches left in Portugal. Some parts date from the sixth century and the interior columns and capitals are carved with foliages and geometric designs from the seventh century.
