= Celtic mythology =

Celtic mythology is the body of myths belonging to the Celtic peoples. Like other Iron Age Europeans, Celtic peoples followed a polytheistic religion, having many gods and goddesses. The mythologies of continental Celtic peoples, such as the Gauls and Celtiberians, did not survive their conquest by the Roman Empire, the loss of their Celtic languages and their subsequent conversion to Christianity. Only remnants are found in Greco-Roman sources and archaeology. Most surviving Celtic mythology belongs to the Insular Celtic peoples (the Gaels of Ireland and Scotland; the Celtic Britons of western Britain and Brittany). They preserved some of their myths in oral lore, which were eventually written down by Christian scribes in the Middle Ages. Irish mythology has the largest written body of myths, followed by Welsh mythology.

The supernatural race called the Tuatha Dé Danann is believed to be based on the main Celtic gods of Ireland, while many Welsh characters belong either to the Plant Dôn ("Children of Dôn") or the Plant Llŷr ("Children of Llŷr"). Some figures in Insular Celtic myth have ancient continental parallels: Irish Lugh and Welsh Lleu are cognate with Lugus, Goibniu and Gofannon with Gobannos, Macán and Mabon with Maponos, and so on. One common figure is the sovereignty goddess, who represents the land and bestows sovereignty on a king by marrying him. The Otherworld is also a common motif, a parallel realm of the supernatural races, which is visited by some mythical heroes. Celtic myth influenced later Arthurian legend.

== Overview ==
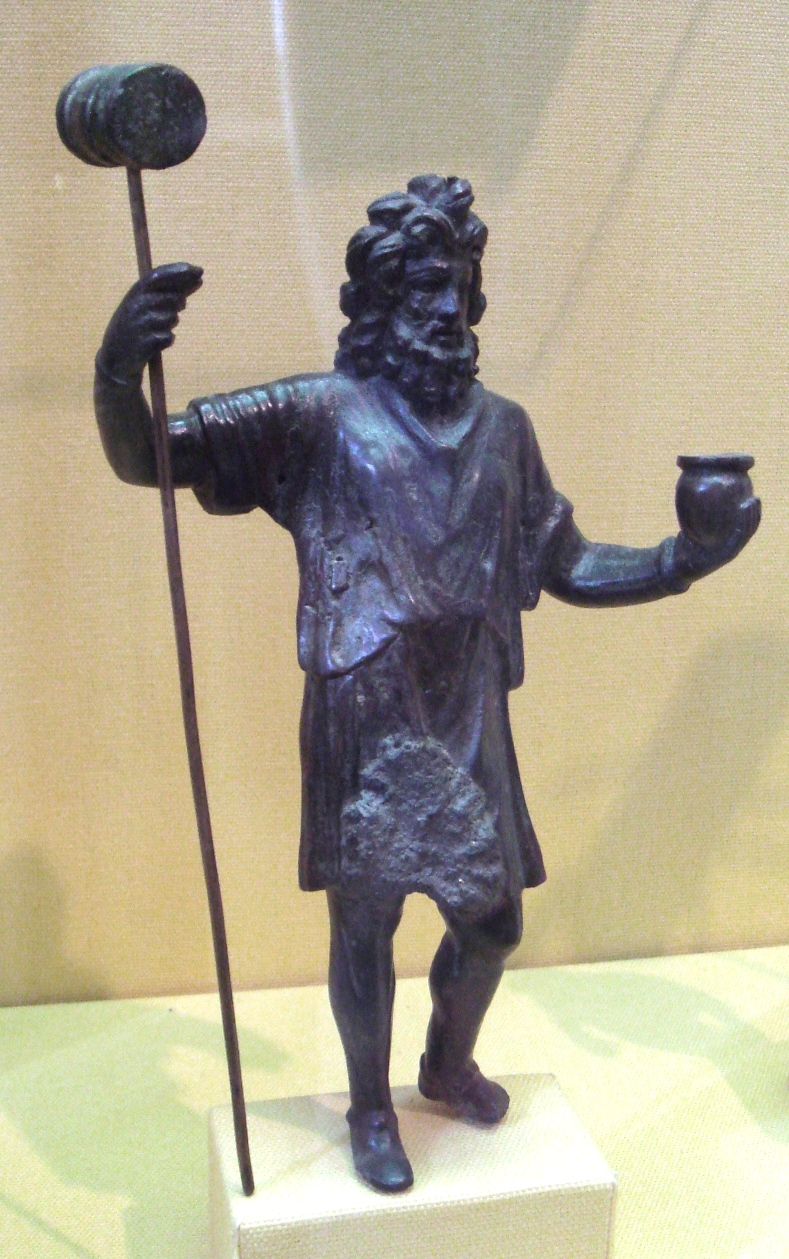
The Celtic god Sucellus

Though the Celtic world at its height covered much of western and central Europe, it was not politically unified, nor was there any substantial central source of cultural influence or homogeneity; as a result, there was a great deal of variation in local practices of Celtic religion (although certain motifs, for example, the god Lugh, appear to have diffused throughout the Celtic world). Inscriptions of more than three hundred deities, often equated with their Roman counterparts, have survived, but of these most appear to have been genii locorum, local or tribal gods, and few were widely worshiped. However, from what has survived of Celtic mythology, it is more possible to discern commonalities that hint at a more unified pantheon than is often credited.

The nature and functions of these ancient gods can be deduced from their names, the location of their inscriptions, their iconography, the Roman gods they are equated with, and similar figures from later bodies of Celtic mythology.

Celtic mythology is found in distinct if related, subgroups, largely corresponding to the branches of the Celtic languages:

- Ancient Celtic religion (known primarily through archaeological sources rather than through written mythology)
- mythology in Goidelic languages, represented chiefly by Irish mythology (also shared with Manx mythology and Scottish mythology)
  - Mythological Cycle
  - Ulster Cycle
  - Fenian Cycle
  - Cycles of the Kings
- mythology in Brittonic languages
  - Welsh mythology
  - Cornish mythology
  - Breton mythology

== Historical sources ==
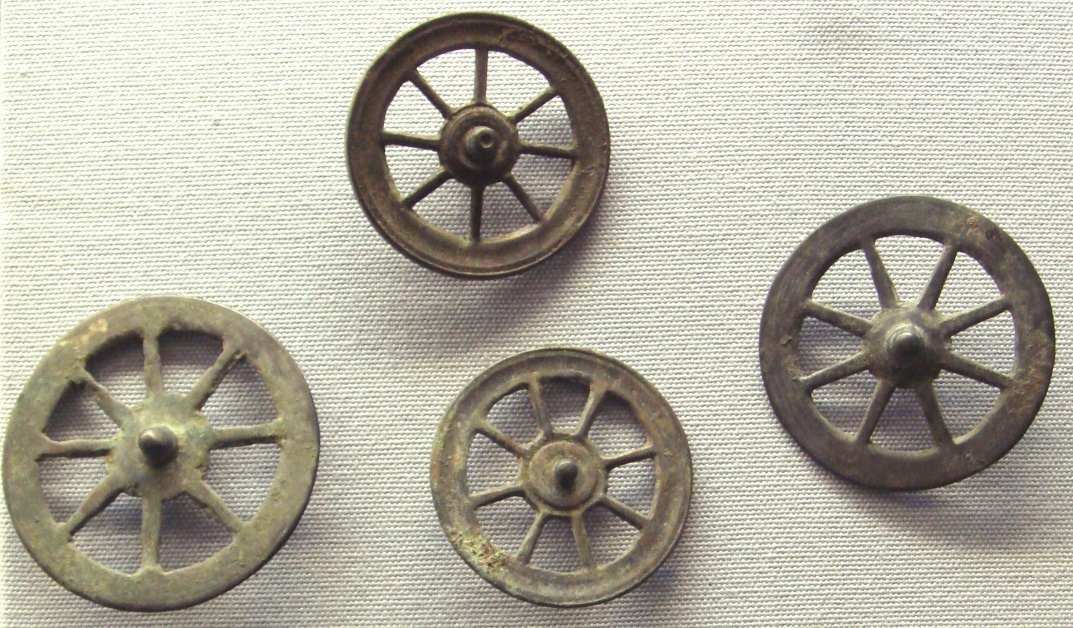
Votive Celtic wheels thought to correspond to the cult of Taranis. Thousands of such wheels have been found in sanctuaries in Gallia Belgica, dating from 50 BCE to 50 CE. National Archaeological Museum, France

As a result of the scarcity of surviving materials bearing written Gaulish, it is surmised that most of the Celtic writings were destroyed by the Romans, though a written form of Gaulish using Greek, Latin, and Old Italic alphabets was used (as evidenced by votive items bearing inscriptions in Gaulish and the Coligny calendar). Julius Caesar attests to the literacy of the Gauls, but also wrote that their priests, the druids, were forbidden to use writing to record certain verses of religious significance (Caesar, Commentarii de Bello Gallico 6.14) while also noting that the Helvetii had a written census (Caesar, De Bello Gallico 1.29).

Rome introduced a more widespread habit of public inscriptions and broke the power of the druids in the areas it conquered; in fact, most inscriptions to deities discovered in Gaul (modern France and Northern Italy), Britain, and other formerly (or presently) Celtic-speaking areas post-date the Roman conquest.

Though early Gaels in Ireland and parts of Wales used Ogham script to record short inscriptions (largely personal names), more sophisticated literacy was not introduced to Celtic areas that had not been conquered by Rome until the advent of Christianity. Many Gaelic myths were first recorded by Christian monks, albeit without most of their original religious meanings.

== Irish mythology ==
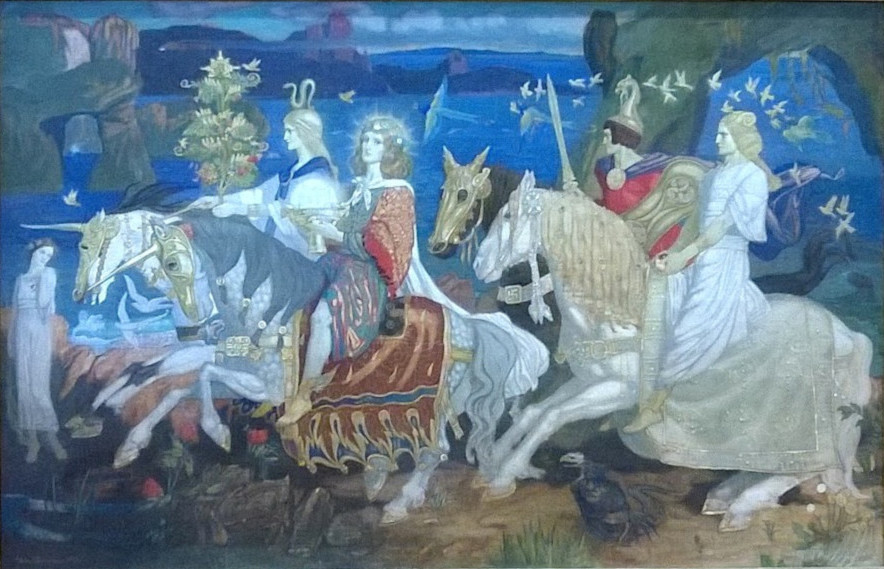
Riders of the Sidhe, a 1911 painting of the aos sí or Tuatha Dé Danann, by the artist John Duncan

Irish mythology is the largest surviving branch of Celtic mythology. It was originally passed down orally in the prehistoric era. Many myths were later written down in the early medieval era by Christian scribes, who modified and Christianized them to some extent.

The myths are conventionally grouped into 'cycles'. The Mythological Cycle, or Cycle of the Gods, consists of tales and poems about the god-like Túatha Dé Danann and other mythical races. Many of the Tuath Dé are thought to represent Irish deities. They are often depicted as kings, queens, druids, bards, warriors, heroes, healers and craftsmen who have supernatural powers. Prominent members of the Tuath Dé include The Dagda ("the great god"), who seems to have been the chief god; The Morrígan ("the great queen" or "phantom queen"), a triple goddess associated with war, fate and sovereignty; Lugh; Nuada; Aengus; Brigid; Manannán; Dian Cecht the healer; and Goibniu the smith, one of the Trí Dé Dána ("three gods of craft"). Their traditional rivals are the monstrous Fomorians (Fomoire), whom the Tuath Dé defeated in the Cath Maige Tuired ("Battle of Moytura"). Other important works in the cycle are the Lebor Gabála Érenn ("Book of Invasions"), a legendary history of Ireland, and the Aided Chlainne Lir ("Children of Lir").

The Ulster Cycle consists of heroic legends about the Ulaid. It focuses on the mythical Ulster king Conchobar mac Nessa and his court at Emain Macha, the hero Cú Chulainn, and their conflict with the Connachta and queen Medb. The longest and most important tale is the epic Táin Bó Cúailnge (Cattle Raid of Cooley).

The Fianna Cycle is about the exploits of the mythical hero Fionn and his warrior band the Fianna, including the lengthy Acallam na Senórach ("Tales of the Elders").

The Kings' Cycle comprises legends about historical and semi-historical kings of Ireland (such as Buile Shuibhne, "The Madness of King Sweeny"), and tales about the origins of dynasties and peoples.

There are also mythical texts that do not fit into any of the cycles; these include the echtrai tales of journeys to the Otherworld (such as The Voyage of Bran), and the Dindsenchas ("lore of places"). Some written material has not survived, and many more myths were probably never written down.

== Welsh mythology ==
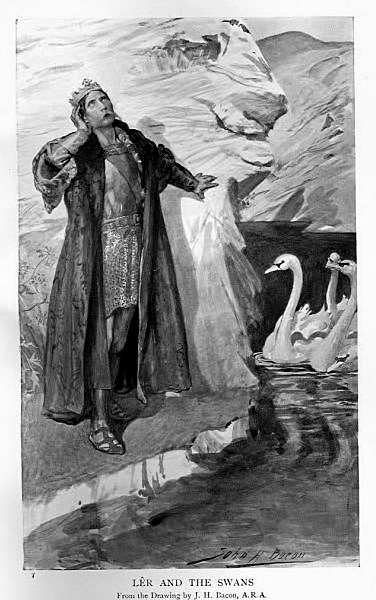
An illustration of Llŷr and the swans by H. R. Millar

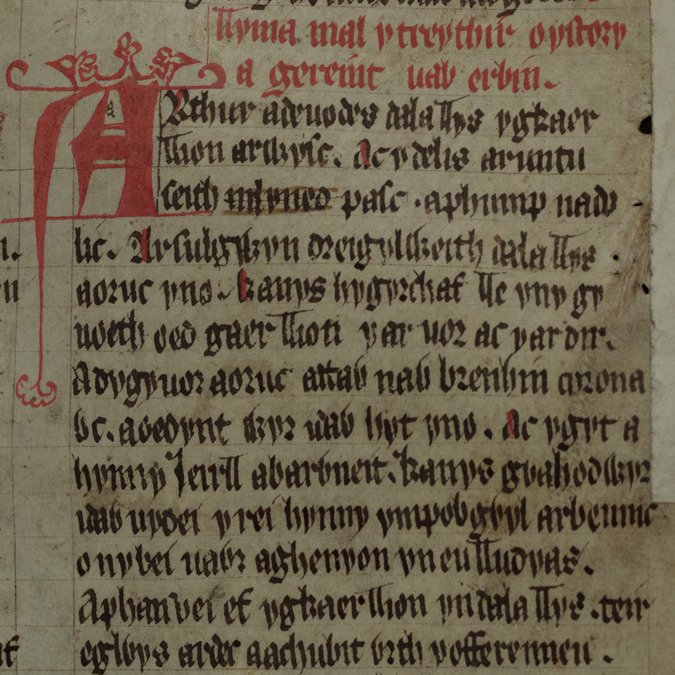
Opening lines of one of the Mabinogi tales from the Red Book of Hergest: Gereint vab Erbin. Arthur a deuodes dala llys yg Caerllion ar Wysc... (Geraint the son of Erbin. Arthur was accustomed to hold his Court at Caerlleon upon Usk...)

Important reflexes of British mythology appear in the Four Branches of the Mabinogi, especially in the names of several characters, such as Rhiannon, Teyrnon, and Brân the Blessed (Bendigeidfran, "Bran [Crow] the Blessed"). Other characters, in all likelihood, derive from mythological sources, and various episodes, such as the appearance of Arawn, a king of the Otherworld seeking the aid of a mortal in his own feuds, and the tale of the hero who cannot be killed except under seemingly contradictory circumstances, can be traced throughout Proto-Indo-European mythology. The children of Llŷr ("Sea" = Irish Ler) in the Second and Third Branches, and the children of Dôn (Danu in Irish and earlier Indo-European tradition) in the Fourth Branch are major figures, but the tales themselves are not primary mythology.

While further mythological names and references appear elsewhere in Welsh narrative and tradition, especially in the tale of Culhwch and Olwen, where we find, for example, Mabon ap Modron ("Divine Son of the Divine Mother"), and in the collected Welsh Triads, not enough is known of the British mythological background to reconstruct either a narrative of creation or a coherent pantheon of British deities. Though there is much in common with Irish myth, there may have been no unified British mythological tradition per se. Whatever its ultimate origins, the surviving material has been put to good use in the service of literary masterpieces that address the cultural concerns of Wales in the early and later Middle Ages.

== Remnants of Gaulish and other mythology ==
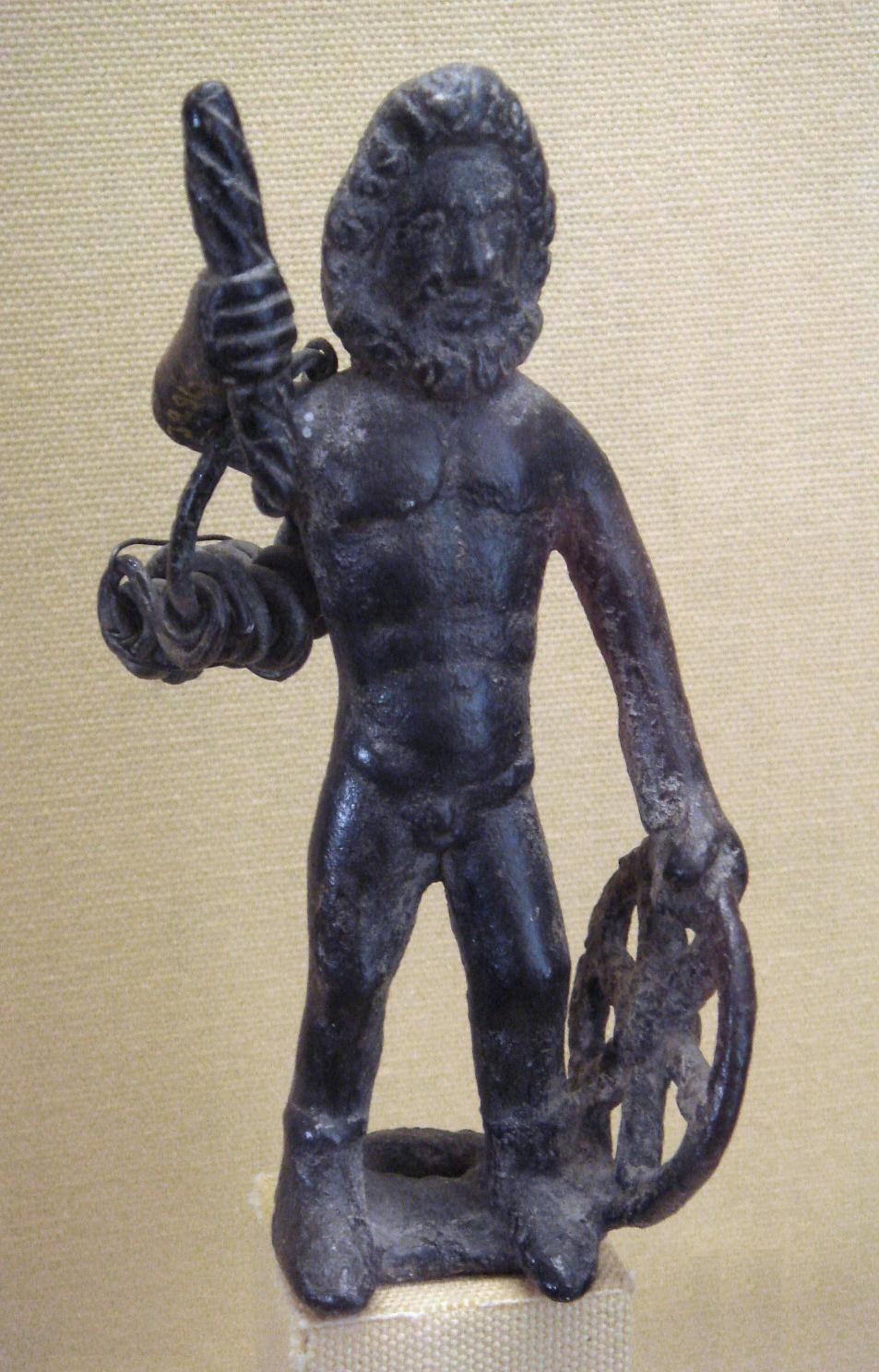
Taranis (with Celtic wheel and thunderbolt), Le Chatelet, Gourzon, Haute-Marne, France

The Celts also worshiped a number of deities of which little more is known than their names. Classical writers preserve a few fragments of legends or myths that may possibly be Celtic.

According to the Syrian rhetorician Lucian, Ogmios was supposed to lead a band of men chained by their ears to his tongue as a symbol of the strength of his eloquence.

The first-century Roman poet Lucan mentions the gods Taranis, Teutates and Esus, but there is little Celtic evidence that these were important deities.

A number of objets d'art, coins, and altars may depict scenes from lost myths, such as the representations of Tarvos Trigaranus or of an equestrian ‘Jupiter’ surmounting the Anguiped (a snake-legged human-like figure). The Gundestrup cauldron has also been interpreted mythically.

Along with dedications giving us god names, there are also deity representations to which no name has yet been attached. Among these are images of a three-headed or three-faced god, a squatting god, a god with a snake, a god with a wheel, and a horseman with a kneeling giant. Some of these images can be found in Late Bronze Age peat bogs in Britain, indicating the symbols were both pre-Roman and widely spread across Celtic culture. The distribution of some of the images has been mapped and shows a pattern of central concentration of an image along with a wide scatter, indicating these images were most likely attached to specific tribes and were distributed from some central point of tribal concentration outward along the lines of trade. The image of the three-headed god is centrally concentrated among the Belgae, between the Oise, Marne, and Moselle rivers. The horseman with the kneeling giant is centered on either side of the Rhine. These examples seem to indicate regional preferences for a common image stock.

=== Julius Caesar on Celtic gods and their significance ===
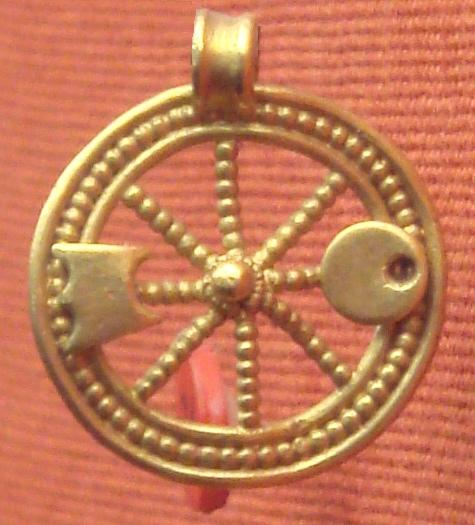
Golden Celtic wheel with symbols, Balesme, Haute-Marne. National Archaeological Museum

The classic entry about the Celtic gods of Gaul is by Julius Caesar's history of his war in Gaul. In this he names the five principal gods worshiped in Gaul (according to the practice of his time, he gives the names of the closest equivalent Roman gods) and describes their roles:

Mercury was the most venerated of all the deities, and numerous representations of him were to be discovered. Mercury was seen as the originator of all the arts (and is often taken to refer to Lugus for this reason), the supporter of adventurers and of traders, and the mightiest power concerning trade and profit.

Next the Gauls revered Apollo, Mars, Jupiter, and Minerva. Among these divinities, Caesar described the Gauls as holding roughly equal views as other populations: Apollo dispels sickness, Minerva encourages skills, Jupiter governs the skies, and Mars influences warfare. MacBain argues that Apollo corresponds to Irish Lugh, Mercury to Manannan mac Lir, Jupiter to the Dagda, Mars to Neit, and Minerva to Brigit.

In addition to these five, Caesar mentions that the Gauls traced their ancestry to a god he likened to Dis Pater (possibly Irish Donn).

== See also ==
- Banshee
- Cantabrian mythology
- Celtic Christianity
- Fisher King
- Galician mythology
- Niskai
- Triskelion
- Norse mythology

== Bibliography ==
- de Vries, Jan, Keltische Religion (1961).
- Duval, Paul-Marie, Les Dieux de la Gaule, new ed. updated and enlarged (1976)
- Mac Cana, Proinsias. Celtic Mythology. New York: Hamlyn, 1970. ISBN 0-600-00647-6
- Mac Cana, Proinsias, The Learned Tales of Medieval Ireland (Irish Literature – Studies), Dublin Institute for Advanced Studies (1980): ISBN 1-85500-120-9
- MacKillop, James, Dictionary of Celtic Mythology. Oxford: Oxford University Press, 1998. ISBN 0-19-280120-1
- Maier, Bernhard, Dictionary of Celtic religion and culture, Boydell & Brewer 1997 ISBN 978-0-85115-660-6
- O'Rahilly, Thomas F. Early Irish History and Mythology (1991, reissued 1971)
- Rolleston, T.W. Celtic Myths and Legends. Dover Publications Inc. (1911, 1990 reprint). ISBN 0486265072
- Rhys, John, Lectures on the Origin and Growth of Religion as Illustrated by Celtic Heathendom 3rd ed. (1898, reprinted 1979)
- Sjoestedt, M. L., Gods and Heroes of the Celts. 1949; translated by Myles Dillon. repr. Berkeley, CA: Turtle Press, 1990. ISBN 1-85182-179-1
- Squire, Charles. Celtic Myth and Legend. Newcastle Publishing Co. 1975. ISBN 0-87877-030-5
- Stercks, Claude, Éléments de cosmogonie celtique (1986)
- Vendryes, Joseph; Ernest Tonnelat & B.-O. Unbegaun Les Religions des Celtes, des Germains et des anciens Slaves (1948)
