= Irish mythology =

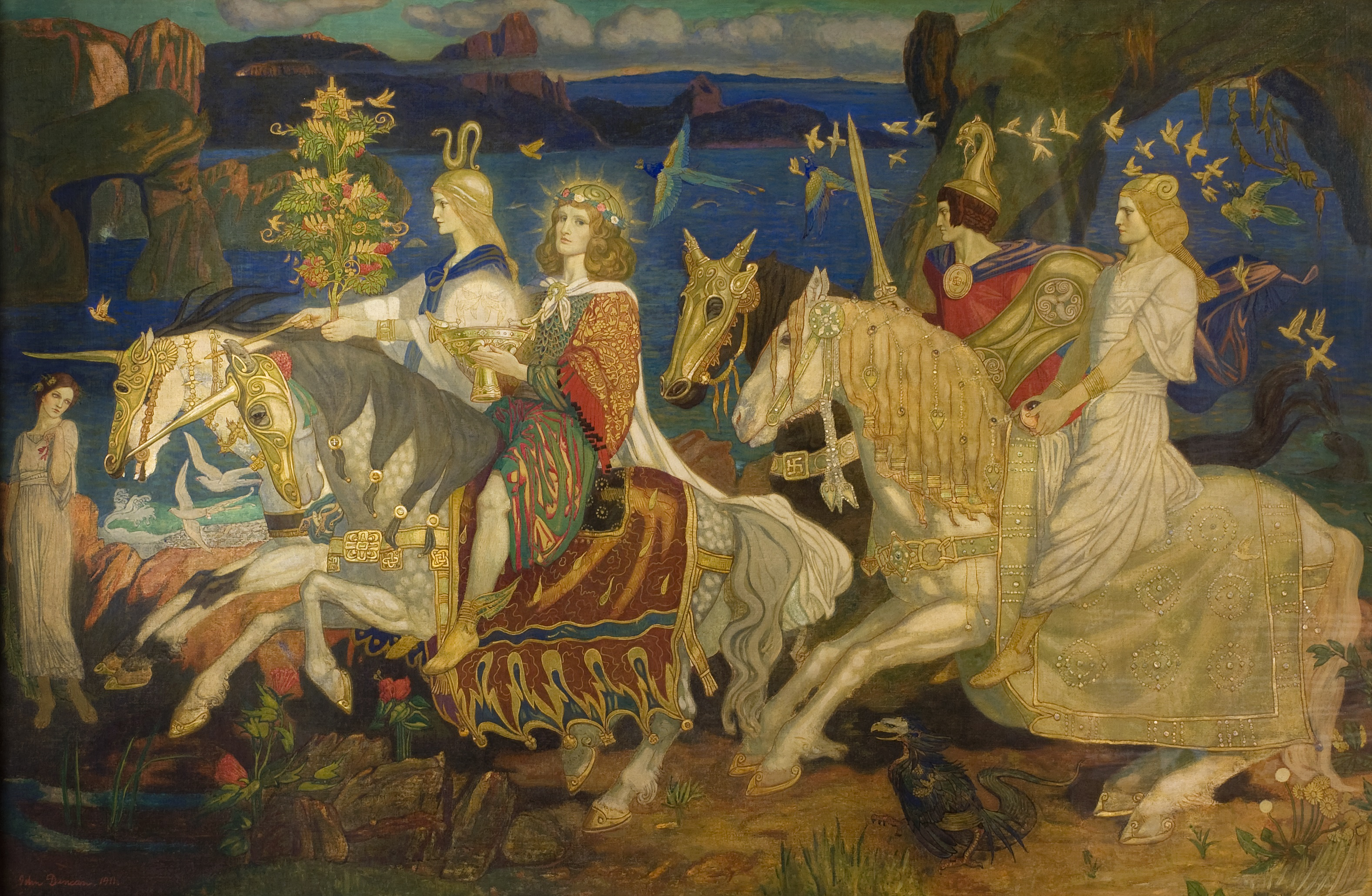
Riders of the Sidhe, a 1911 painting of the aos sí or Otherworldly people of the mounds, by the artist John Duncan

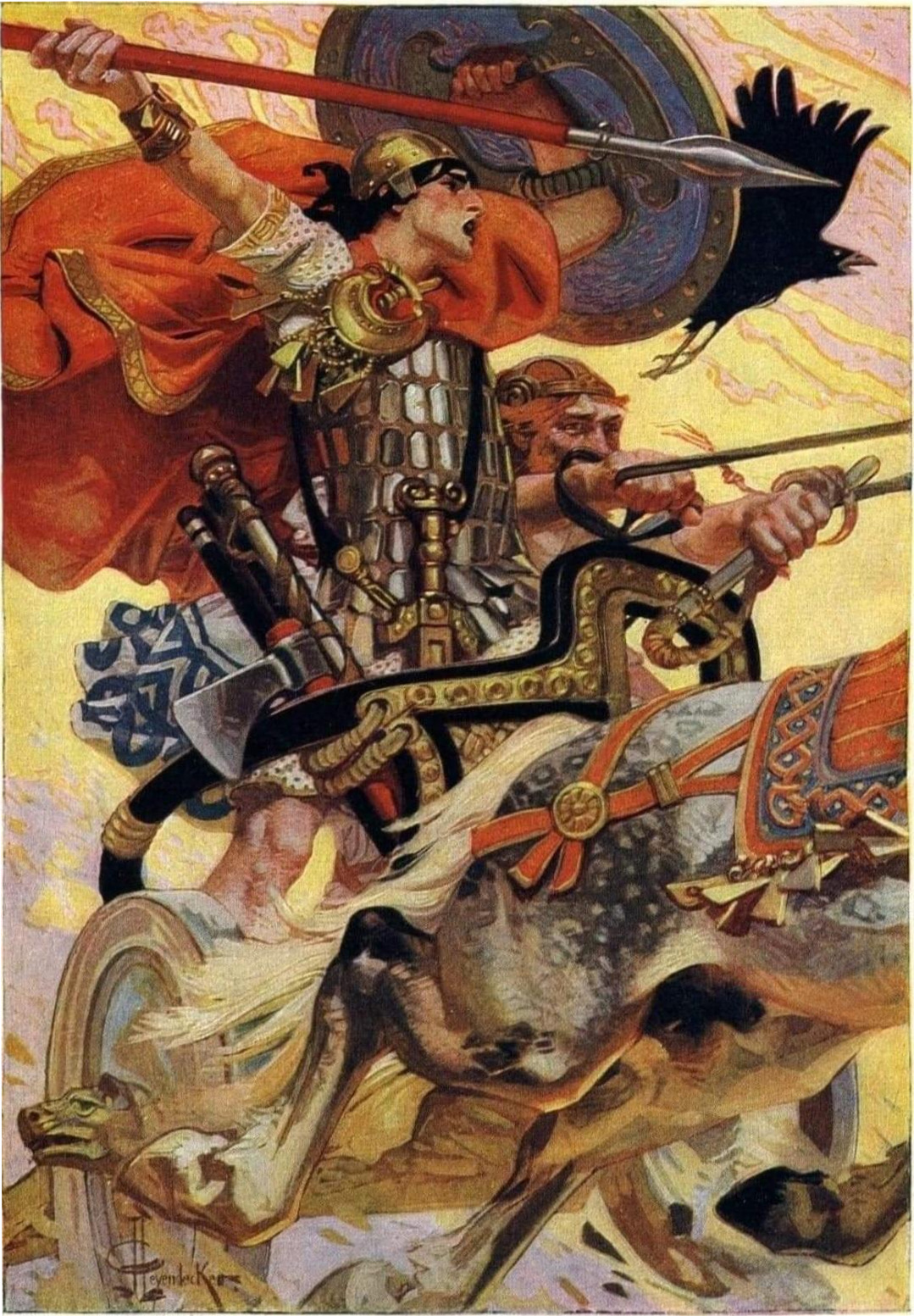
Cuchulain in Battle by Joseph Christian Leyendecker, 1911

Irish mythology is the body of myths indigenous to the island of Ireland. It was originally passed down orally in the prehistoric era. In the early medieval era, myths were written down by Christian scribes, who revised it considerably in order to fit the history and religion according to Christianized learning. Irish mythology is the best-preserved branch of Celtic mythology.

The myths are conventionally grouped into 'cycles'. The Mythological Cycle consists of tales and poems about the god-like Tuatha Dé Danann, who are based on Ireland's pagan deities, and other mythical races like the Fomorians. Important works in the cycle are the Lebor Gabála Érenn ("Book of Invasions"), a legendary history of Ireland, the Cath Maige Tuired ("Battle of Moytura"), and the Aided Chlainne Lir ("Children of Lir"). The heroic cycles and even the Historical Cycle (Cycle of the Kings) are also considered repositories of mythological texts. The Ulster Cycle consists of heroic legends relating to the Ulaid, the most important of which is the epic Táin Bó Cúailnge ("Cattle Raid of Cooley"). The Fenian Cycle focuses on the exploits of the mythical hero Finn and his warrior band the Fianna, including the lengthy Acallam na Senórach ("Tales of the Elders"). The Cycles of the Kings comprises legends about historical and semi-historical kings of Ireland (such as Conn of the Hundred Battles and Buile Shuibhne, "The Madness of King Sweeny"), and tales about the origins of dynasties and peoples.

There are also mythological texts that do not fit into any of the cycles; these include the echtrai tales of journeys to the Otherworld (Note: Dillon (1948) chapter "The Adventures", pp. 101ff., Early Irish Literature apud Sienkewicz (1996)) (such as The Voyage of Bran), and the Dindsenchas ("lore of places"). Some written materials have not survived, and many more myths were likely never written down.

== Figures ==
Myles Dillon and Nora K. Chadwick classify Irish gods into four main groups. Group one encompasses the older gods of Gaul and Britain. The second group is the main focus of much of the mythology and surrounds the native Irish gods with their homes in burial mounds. The third group are the gods that dwell in the sea and the fourth group includes stories of the Otherworld. The gods that appear most often are the Dagda and Lugh.

=== Tuatha Dé Danann ===
The main supernatural beings in Irish mythology are the Tuatha Dé Danann. (Note: Mackillop: "principal family of euhemerized pre-Christian deities".)

==== Terminology ====
Tuatha Dé Danann is construed to mean "the folk of the goddess Danann or "people/tribe/nation of the god Ana[?]" (Note: Dana is the form of Ana with the initial "d-" added (prothesis).) Ana or Anu is an attested name of a goddess (Note: e.g. Cormac's glossary) (with genitive form Annan); Danann is only found in later attestations; reconstructed (nominative) forms *Danu or *Dana are unattested and are speculative. The solution may be that Dana is merely a d-added variant of the goddess Ana/Anu However, others suggest it was a later scholarly invention, an extension added to the original appellation which was simply Tuath Dé (god-folk), until the simpler version became inconveniently ambiguous with Tuath Dé used to denote the "People of God" (i.e., Israelites).

Whatever the origin, Dana/Danu/Danand is treated as just a variant form of Ana/Anu/Anand in certain scholarly circles, and thus a bona fide goddess, e.g., Macalister's translation of the Lebor Gabala. A Welsh goddess Dôn is mentioned as possibly connected, insinuating the plausibility of the Dana/Danu goddess in Irish myth.

==== General description ====
Prominent male deities include The Dagda ("the great god"); the long-armed Lugh; the silver-armed Nuada; Aengus; the sea god Manannán; Dian Cécht the healer. There are also Goibniu the smith, Creidhne the goldsmith/brazier, and Luchta the carpenter. (Note: These three may be the identity of the mysterious Trí Dé Dána ("three gods of craftsmanship") according to speculation.) There is also Ogma, a god of eloquence and a warrior, as well as Nét (Neit) a "god of war". (Note: Cormac's glossary, s.v. "Neit.")

The Warrior goddesses are often depicted as a triad: The Morrígan (Note: Whose name means "the great queen"), Macha, and Badb (Note: Whose name means "Royston crow".) (Note: The triad may consist of other combinations substituting Nemain.) while Keating's History has little to say about these three deities. The warrior goddesses appear in the saga Táin Bó Cúailnge, meddling in the human wars between the Ulstermen and Connacht. The Morrígan appears in the guise of a crow (badb, namesake of her sister goddess) before Cú Chulainn. In a later encounter, she transforms into an eel, wolf, and cow.

Brigit a "goddess of poets" and daughter of the Dagda.

Ana/Anu aka Dannan/Dana/Danu is as aforementioned, the "mother of the Irish gods", (Note: In Sanas Cormaic Ana is Latin: "mater deorum hibernensium", where the editors note Ana is better known as "Dannan". or "the mother of gods".) (Note: Mother of Brian and his brothers, but only probably.) and possibly an alias of The Morrígan.

The Tuatha Dé Danann live in the Otherworld, which is described as either a parallel world or a heavenly land beyond the sea or under the earth's surface. Many of them are associated with specific places in the landscape, especially the sídh mounds; the ancient burial mounds and passage tombs which are entrances to Otherworld realms. The Tuath Dé can hide themselves with a féth fíada ('magic mist') (Note: As told in Altram Tige Dá Medar ("The Nurture of the Houses of the Two Milk Vessels") and appear to humans only when they wish to.

The Tuatha Dé intermarried with their adversaries, the Fomorians, so that when Nuada became disqualified from kingship due to his debility (loss of arm), Bres who had a Fomorian father took over the kingship of the Tuatha Dé. There ensued the Second Battle of Mag Tuired where Lug led the victory by slaying the Fomorian champion Balor, his own grandfather.

=== Fomorians ===
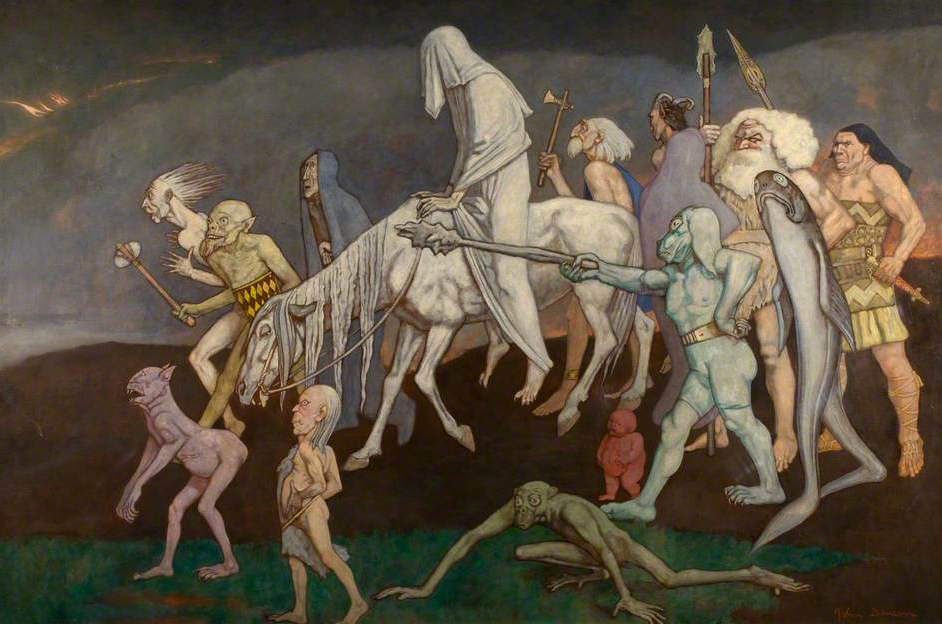
The Fomorians, as depicted by John Duncan (1912)

The Fomorians or Fomori (Old Irish: Fomóire) are a supernatural race, who are often portrayed as hostile and monstrous beings. Originally, they were said to come from under the sea or the earth. Later, they were portrayed as sea raiders, which was probably influenced by the Viking raids on Ireland around that time. Later still they were portrayed as giants. They are enemies of Ireland's first settlers and opponents of the Tuatha Dé Danann, although some members of the two races have offspring. The Tuath Dé defeat the Fomorians in the Battle of Mag Tuired. This has been likened to other Indo-European myths of a war between gods, such as the Æsir and Vanir in Norse mythology and the Olympians and Titans in Greek mythology.

=== Heroes ===
The idea was articulated by v in 1940 (translated 1949) that members of the two main Irish heroic cycles (Ulster Cycle, Finn Cycle) fell into two distinct groups, the Ulstermen being the "tribal hero" functioning within the boundaries of the community, and the fíanna the "extra-tribal hero" or the "outsiders" Joseph F. Nagy in 1985 further explored the mythical significance of this boundary in Finn Cycle tales, stressing the idea of liminality, where the border was seen as the threshold between the material world and the Otherworld or "sacred otherness".

One comparison allegorize the Ulster hero Cú Chulainn as a warrior-dog, (Note: Cú Chulainn's name of course implies "watchdog of Culann", which he was to assume the role of to replace the dog he killed.) and Finn as a hunter-wolf Vielle (1994), p. 227 This two group categorization is one of continuing debate. Some reservations are expressed as to whether Nagy's idea of "liminal" boundaries presents such a starkly opposite dichotomy. The idea that the fíanna differed from the Ulster heroes were less tied to a homeland had been noticed long before Sjoestedt, but the older characterization of the fíanna as "outcasts" or "mercenaries" were inadequate, as T. G. E. Powell explains it, and Sjoestedt's insight demonstrated the fíanna were still attached to the community and not cast out, but were in voluntary exile, and able to return to the community. Powell's own suggestion was that the difference came from Cú Chulainn belonging to the aristocratic class, while the fíanna had its origin in some tribal group not among the historical ruling classes of Ireland. In literature, it is pointed out that only the Ulster heroes were sung in the form of a full-fledged epic saga, the Táin Bó Cúailnge, while there were mostly only disparate pieces of poetry and prose tales regarding the fíanna (some as old as the 7th century), the Acallam na Senórach (c. 1200) being the central and the most comprehensive narrative in the fíanaigecht corpus (cf. Fenian Cycle).

The hero Cúchulainn's fighting skills were fostered by the women warriors Scáthach and Aoife (Aífe) who exhibited otherworldly prowess. (Note: Búanann, Bodbmall Scáthach are "multiforms of a supernatural martial foster-mother figure" according to Nagy.,) Likewise, the warrior woman Liath Luachra trained the hero Fionn mac Cumhaill.

The Fianna warrior bands were thus the outsiders, connected with the wilderness, youth, and liminal states. (Note: Nagy (1985), pp. 17–40 apud DeAngelo (2025) [2019]; pp. 17, 33 apud FitzPatrick (2023)) Their leader was called Fionn mac Cumhaill, and the first stories of him are told in fourth century. They are considered aristocrats and outsiders who protect the community from other outsiders; though they may winter with a settled community, they spend the summers living wild, training adolescents and providing a space for war-damaged veterans. The time of vagrancy for these youths is designated as a transition in life post puberty but pre-manhood. Manhood being identified as owning or inheriting property. They live under the authority of their own leaders, or may be somewhat anarchic, and may follow other deities or spirits than the settled communities. The church refused to recognize this group as an institution and referred to them as "sons of death".

=== Legendary creatures ===
The Oilliphéist is a sea-serpent-like monster in Irish mythology and folklore. These monsters were believed to inhabit many lakes and rivers in Ireland and there are legends of saints, especially St. Patrick, and heroes fighting them.

In Irish folklore there is also the Cailleach or hag, said to have lived many lives that begin and end with her in stone formation. She is still celebrated at Ballycrovane Ogham Stone with offerings and the retelling of her life's stories. The tales of the Cailleach connect her to both land and sea. Several Otherworldly women are associated with sacred sites where seasonal festivals are held. They include Macha of Eamhain Mhacha, Carman, and Tailtiu, among others.

== Sources ==
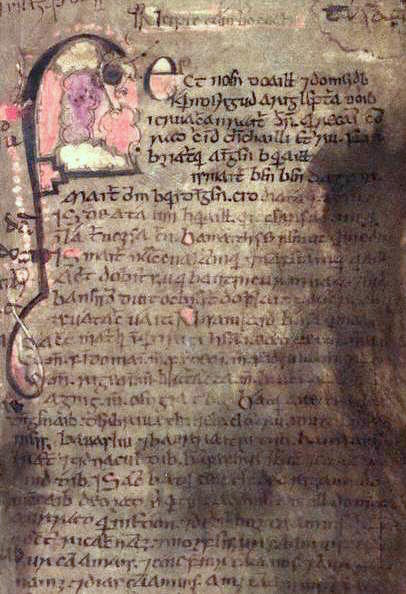
Folio 53 of the Book of Leinster. Medieval manuscripts are the main source for Irish mythology and early literature.

The key and earliest manuscript sources for Irish mythology are the late 11th/early 12th century Lebor na hUidre (LU, Book of the Dun Cow); (Note: In the library of the Royal Irish Academy) the Book of Leinster (early 12th-century); (Note: Held in Library of Trinity College Dublin) and MS Rawlinson B 502 (Rawl, composite of mid-12th century and 14th–15th century redactions). (Note: Held by Bodleian Library at the University of Oxford) Despite the dates of these sources, most of the material they contain predates their composition.

The Yellow Book of Lecan (YBL) (Note: Library of Trinity College) is another important codex that contains earlier pieces of writing even though it was compiled at a much later period, 1391–1582. (Note: Mackillop.) The YBL includes the legends of Fionn Mac Cumhail, and fragmentary portions of Táin Bó Cúailnge ("The Cattle Raid of Cooley") of the same version as the oldest (but incomplete) copy in LU.

Other important sources compiled around the late 14th century or the early 15th century are The Book of Ballymote (BB) and Leabhar Ua Maine (Book of Hy Many). (Note: Both these are in the Royal Irish Academy.) A fuller text concerning the Four Treasures of the Tuatha Dé Danann is found in the YBL and the BB, though a briefer account is also found in the Lebor Gabala.

Other 15th-century manuscript The Book of Fermoy contains, for instance, the Altram Tige Dá Medar. (Note: Title of the narrative described above about the scattering of the defeated Tuatha Dé, and Manannan using the magical fog.)

And in the modern period, Geoffrey Keating's Foras Feasa ar Éirinn (The History of Ireland) (c. 1640).

Most of these manuscripts were created by Christian monks, who may well have been torn between a desire to record their native culture and hostility to pagan beliefs, resulting in some of the gods being euhemerised. Many of the later sources may also have formed parts of a propaganda effort designed to create a history for the people of Ireland that could bear comparison with the mythological descent of their British invaders from the founders of Rome, as promulgated by Geoffrey of Monmouth and others. There was also a tendency to rework Irish genealogies to fit them into the schemas of Greek or biblical genealogy.

Whether medieval Irish literature provides reliable evidence of oral tradition remains a matter for debate. Kenneth Jackson described the Ulster Cycle as a "window on the Iron Age", and Garret Olmsted has attempted to draw parallels between Táin Bó Cuailnge, the Ulster Cycle epic and the iconography of the Gundestrup Cauldron. However, these "nativist" claims have been challenged by "revisionist" scholars who believe that much of the literature was created, rather than merely recorded, in Christian times, more or less in imitation of the epics of classical literature that came with Latin learning. The revisionists point to passages apparently influenced by the Iliad in Táin Bó Cuailnge, and to the Togail Troí, an Irish adaptation of Dares Phrygius' De excidio Troiae historia, found in the Book of Leinster. They also argue that the material culture depicted in the stories is generally closer to that of the time of their composition than to that of the distant past.

== Mythological Cycle ==
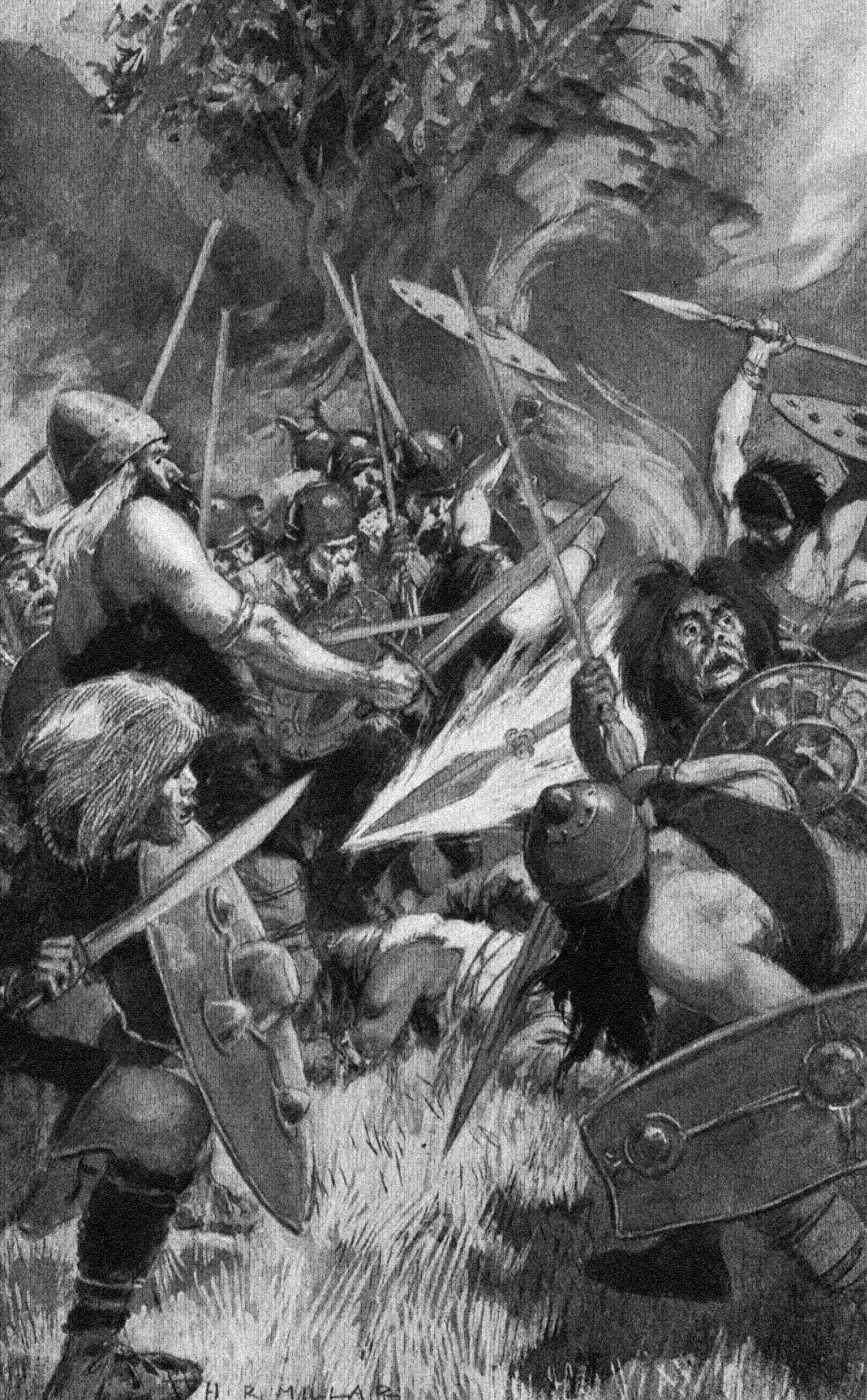
Lugh's Magic Spear; illustration by H. R. Millar

The Mythological Cycle, comprising stories of the former gods and origins of the Irish, is the least well preserved of the four cycles. It is about the principal people who invaded and inhabited the island. The people include Cessair and her followers, the Formorians, the Partholinians, the Nemedians, the Firbolgs, the Tuatha Dé Danann, and the Milesians. The most important sources are the Metrical Dindshenchas or Lore of Places and the Lebor Gabála Érenn or Book of Invasions. Other manuscripts preserve such mythological tales as The Dream of Aengus, Tochmarc Étaíne ("the Wooing of Étain") and Cath Maige Tuireadh, the (second) Battle of Magh Tuireadh. One of the best known of all Irish stories, Oidheadh Clainne Lir, or The Tragedy of the Children of Lir, is also part of this cycle.

Lebor Gabála Érenn is a pseudo-history of Ireland, tracing the ancestry of the Irish back to before Noah. It tells of a series of invasions or "takings" of Ireland by a succession of peoples, the fifth of whom was the people known as the Tuatha Dé Danann ("Peoples of the Goddess Danu"), who were believed to have inhabited the island before the arrival of the Gaels, or Milesians. They faced opposition from their enemies, the Fomorians, led by Balor of the Evil Eye. Balor was eventually slain by Lugh Lámfada (Lugh of the Long Arm) at the second battle of Magh Tuireadh. With the arrival of the Gaels, the Tuatha Dé Danann retired underground to become the fairy people of later myth and legend.

The Metrical Dindshenchas is the great onomastics work of early Ireland, giving the naming legends of significant places in a sequence of poems. It includes a lot of important information on Mythological Cycle figures and stories, including the Battle of Tailtiu, in which the Tuatha Dé Danann were defeated by the Milesians.

By the Middle Ages, the Tuatha Dé Danann were not viewed so much as gods as the shape-shifting magician population of an earlier Golden Age Ireland. Key texts such as Lebor Gabála Érenn and Cath Maige Tuireadh present them as kings and heroes of the distant past, complete with death-tales. However, there is considerable evidence, both in the texts and from the wider Celtic world, that they were once considered deities.

== Ulster Cycle ==
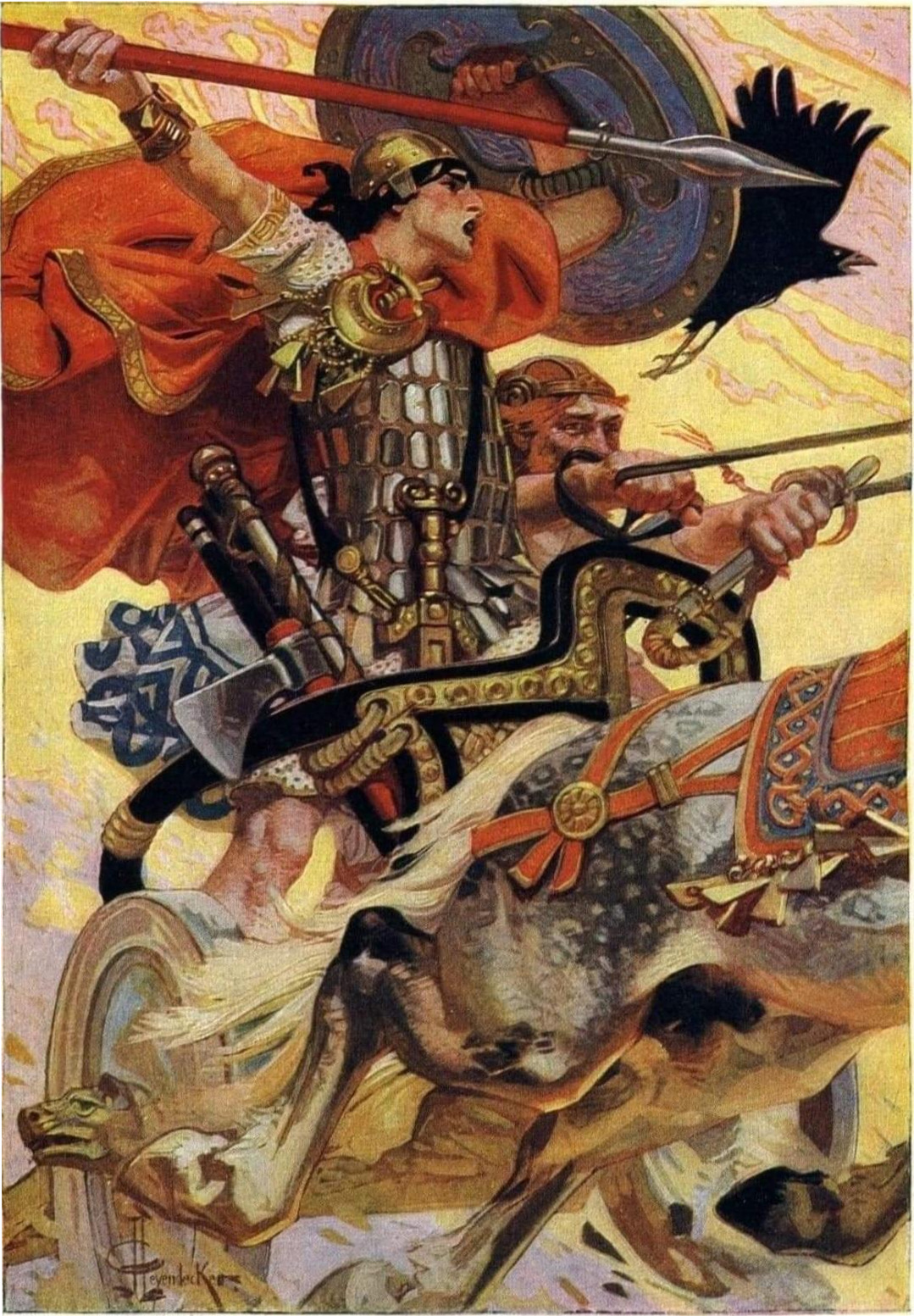
"Cuchulain in Battle", illustration by J. C. Leyendecker in T. W. Rolleston's Myths & Legends of the Celtic Race, 1911

The Ulster Cycle is traditionally set around the first century AD, and most of the action takes place in the provinces of Ulster and Connacht. It consists of a group of heroic tales dealing with the lives of Conchobar mac Nessa, king of Ulster, the great hero Cú Chulainn, who was the son of Lug (Lugh), and of their friends, lovers, and enemies. These are the Ulaid, or people of the North-Eastern corner of Ireland and the action of the stories centres round the royal court at Emain Macha (known in English as Navan Fort), close to the modern town of Armagh. The Ulaid had close links with the Irish colony in Scotland, and part of Cú Chulainn's training takes place in that colony.

The cycle consists of stories of the births, early lives and training, wooing, battles, feastings, and deaths of the heroes. It also reflects a warrior society in which warfare consists mainly of single combats and wealth is measured mainly in cattle. These stories are written mainly in prose. The centerpiece of the Ulster Cycle is the Táin Bó Cúailnge. Other important Ulster Cycle tales include The Tragic Death of Aife's only Son, Bricriu's Feast, and The Destruction of Da Derga's Hostel. The Exile of the Sons of Usnach, better known as the tragedy of Deirdre, became the source material for plays by William Butler Yeats (Deirdre, 1907) and John Millington Synge (Deirdre of the Sorrows, 1910).

This cycle is, in some respects, close to the mythological cycle. Some of the characters from the latter reappear, and the same sort of shape-shifting magic is much in evidence, side by side with a grim, almost callous realism. While we may suspect a few characters, such as Medb or Cú Roí, of once being deities, and Cú Chulainn in particular displays superhuman prowess, the characters are mortal and associated with a specific time and place. If the Mythological Cycle represents a Golden Age, the Ulster Cycle is Ireland's Heroic Age.

== Fianna Cycle ==
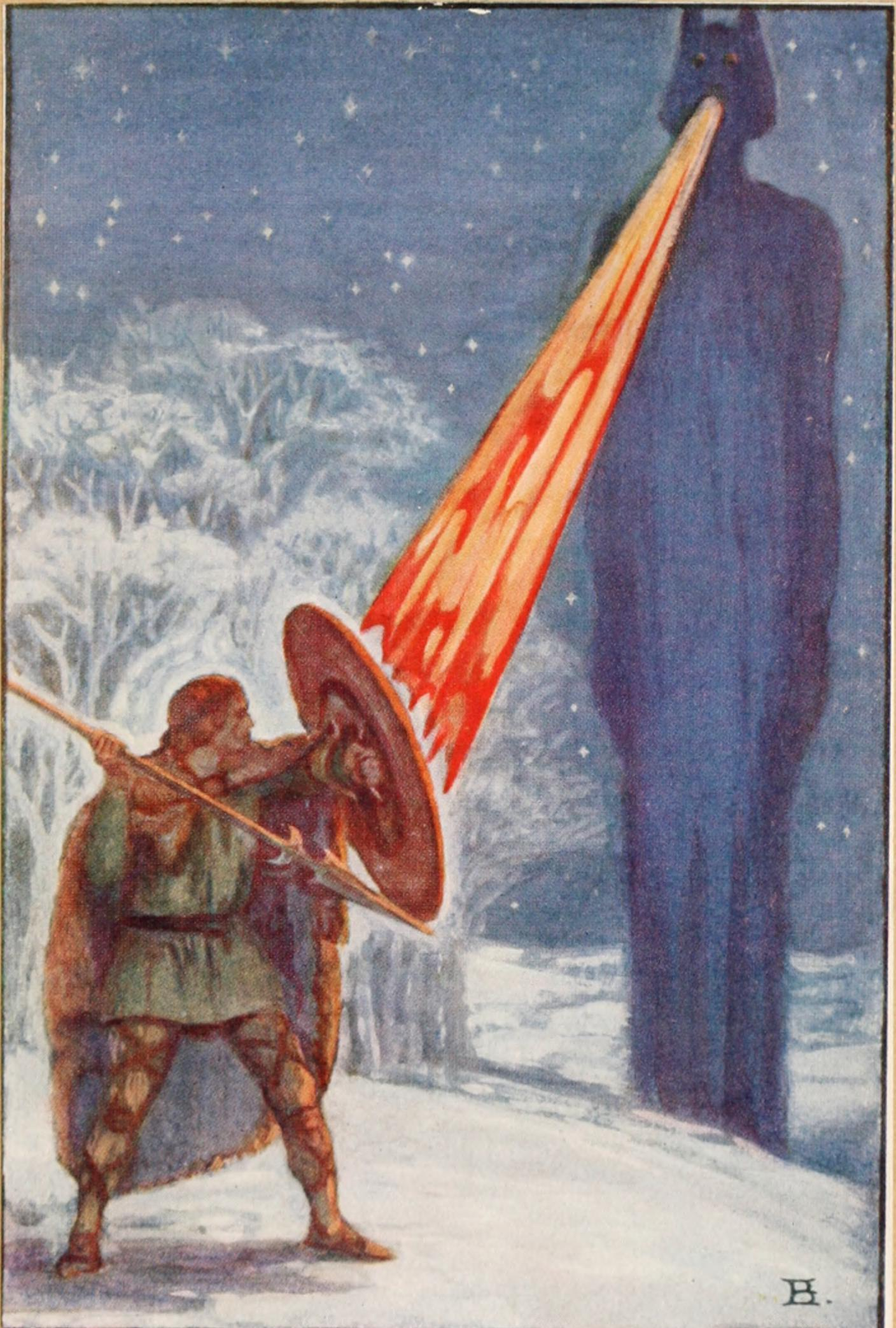
Fionn fighting Aillen, illustration by Beatrice Elvery in Violet Russell's Heroes of the Dawn (1914)

Like the Ulster Cycle, the Fianna Cycle (or Fenian Cycle, also referred to as the Ossianic Cycle) is concerned with the deeds of Irish heroes. The stories of the Cycle appear to be set around the 3rd century and mainly in the provinces of Leinster and Munster. Differently, the Fianna Cycle has strong links to Gaelic Scotland, with many extant texts from that country. They also differ from the Ulster Cycle in that the stories are told mainly in verse, and that in tone they are nearer to the tradition of romance than the tradition of epic. The stories concern the doings of Fionn mac Cumhaill and his band of soldiers, the Fianna.

The single-largest medieval Irish text for the Fianna Cycle is the Acallam na Senórach (Colloquy of the Old Men), which is found in two 15th century manuscripts, the Book of Lismore and Laud 610, as well as a 17th century manuscript from Killiney, County Dublin. The text is dated from linguistic evidence to the 12th century. The text records conversations between Caílte mac Rónáin and Oisín, the last surviving members of the Fianna, and Saint Patrick, and consists of about 8,000 lines. The late dates of the manuscripts may reflect a longer oral tradition for the Fenian stories.

The Fianna of the story are divided into the Clann Baiscne, led by Fionn mac Cumhaill (often rendered as "Finn MacCool", Finn Son of Cumhall), and the Clann Morna, led by his enemy, Goll mac Morna. Goll killed Fionn's father, Cumhal, in battle, and the boy Fionn was brought up in secrecy. As a youth, while being trained in the art of poetry, he accidentally burned his thumb while cooking the Salmon of Knowledge, which allowed him to suck or bite his thumb to receive bursts of stupendous wisdom. He took his place as the leader of his band and numerous tales are told of their adventures. Tóraigheacht Dhiarmada agus Ghráinne (The Pursuit of Diarmuid and Gráinne) billed as the greatest prose narrative of the cycle, has only survived in modern Irish texts dating to the 17th century at the oldest, though still asserted to contain elements from the 10th century. (Note: It was proposed in the 19th century that certain elements of the Pursuit of Diarmuid contributed to Tristan and Iseult, and argued persuasively by Gertrude Schoepperle (Tristan and Isolt, a study of the sources of the romance, 1913) according to Mackillop.) The legend of Oisín and his otherworldly lover Niamh Cinn-Óir is also widespread, and known in various oral tellings, but was not set down in writing until c. 1750 when Mícheál Coimín (1676–1760) composed the Laoi Oisín i dṪír Na nÓg ("Lay of Oisín in the Land of Youth").

The world of the Fianna Cycle is one in which professional warriors spend their time hunting, fighting, and engaging in adventures in the spirit world. New entrants into the band are expected to be knowledgeable in poetry as well as undergo a number of physical tests or ordeals. Most of the poems are attributed to Oisín. This cycle creates a bridge between pre-Christian and Christian times.

== Kings' Cycle ==
It was part of the duty of medieval Irish bards, or court poets, to record the history of the family and the genealogy of the king they served. This they did in poems that blended the mythological and the historical to a greater or lesser degree. The resulting stories form what has come to be known as the Cycle of the Kings, or, more correctly, Cycles, as there are a number of independent groupings. This term is a more recent addition to the cycle, being coined in 1946 by Irish literary critic Myles Dillon.

The kings that are included range from the almost entirely mythological Labraid Loingsech, who allegedly became High King of Ireland around 431 BC, to the entirely historical Brian Boru. However, the greatest glory of the Kings' Cycle is the Buile Shuibhne (The Frenzy of Sweeney), a 12th century tale told in verse and prose. Suibhne, king of Dál nAraidi, was cursed by St. Ronan and became a kind of half-man, half bird, condemned to live out his life in the woods, fleeing from his human companions. The story has captured the imaginations of contemporary Irish poets and has been translated by Trevor Joyce and Seamus Heaney.

== Other tales ==
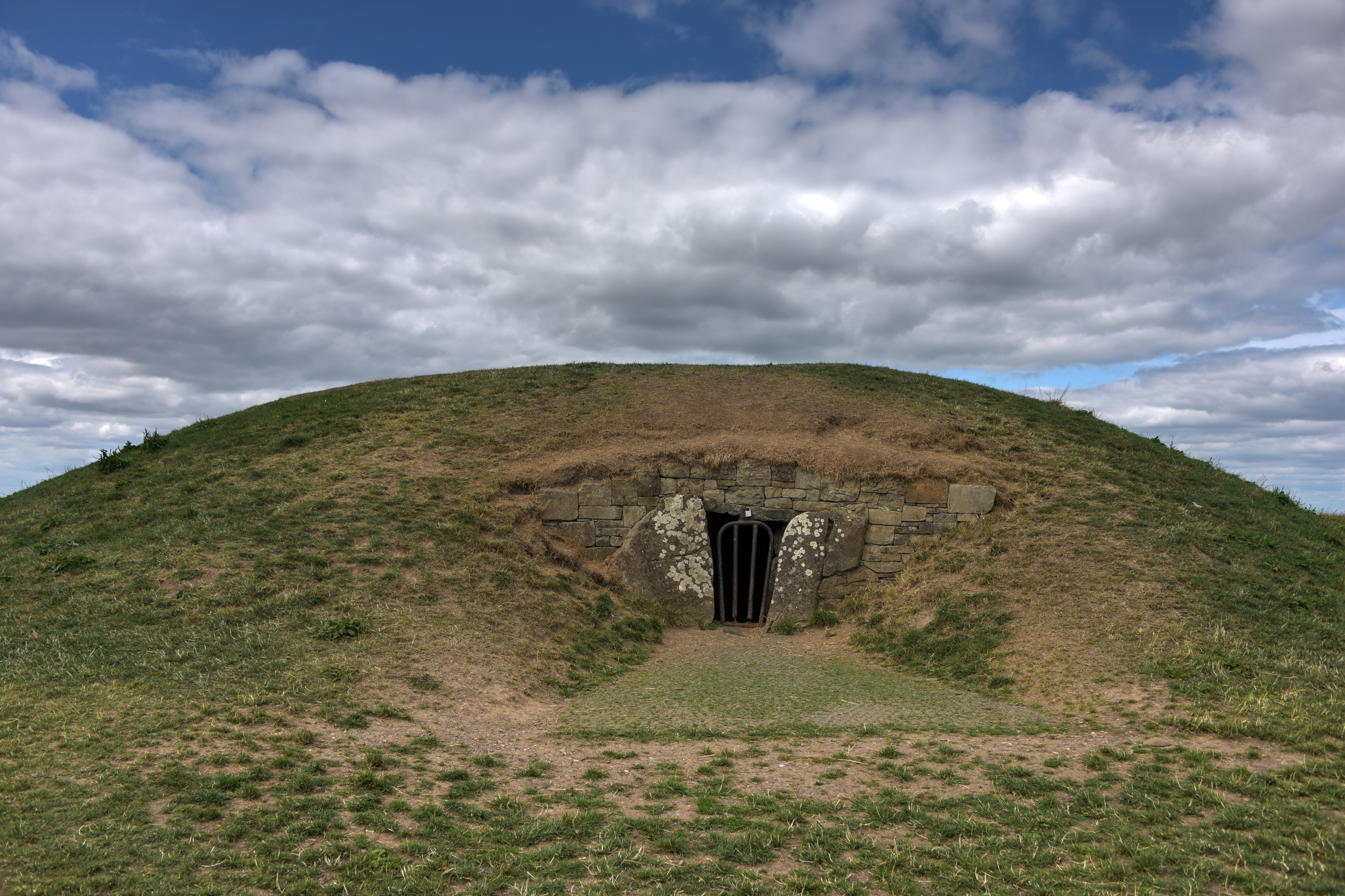
The Mound of the Hostages, located in County Meath. Places beneath mounds and hills were attested locations of the Irish Otherworld.

=== Eachtraí ===
The adventures, or echtrae, are a group of stories of visits to the Irish Other World (which may be westward across the sea, underground, or simply invisible to mortals). The most famous, Oisin in Tir na nÓg belongs to the Fenian Cycle, but several free-standing adventures survive, including The Adventure of Conle, The Voyage of Bran mac Ferbail, and The Adventure of Lóegaire.

=== Immrama ===
The voyages, or immrama, are tales of sea journeys and the wonders seen on them that may have resulted from the combination of the experiences of fishermen combined and the Other World elements that inform the adventures. Of the seven immrama mentioned in the manuscripts, only three have survived: The Voyage of Máel Dúin, the Voyage of the Uí Chorra, and the Voyage of Snedgus and Mac Riagla. The Voyage of Mael Duin is the forerunner of the later Voyage of St. Brendan. While not as ancient, later 8th century AD works, that influenced European literature, include The Vision of Adamnán.

=== Folk tales ===
Although there are no written sources of Irish mythology, many stories are passed down orally through traditional storytelling. Some of these stories have been lost, but some Celtic regions continue to tell folktales to the modern-day. Folktales and stories were primarily preserved by monastic scribes from the bards of nobility. Once the noble houses started to decline, this tradition was put to an abrupt end. The bards passed the stories to their families, and the families would take on the oral tradition of storytelling.

During the first few years of the 20th century, Herminie Templeton Kavanagh wrote down many Irish folk tales, which she published in magazines and in two books. Twenty-six years after her death, the tales from her two books, Darby O'Gill and the Good People and Ashes of Old Wishes, were made into the film Darby O'Gill and the Little People. Noted Irish playwright Lady Gregory also collected folk stories to preserve Irish history. The Irish Folklore Commission gathered folk tales from the general Irish populace from 1935 onward.
