= Ectra =

Ectra may refer to:

- Echtra, a type of pre-Christian Old Irish literature
- European Committee for Telecommunications Regulatory Affairs, part of European Conference of Postal and Telecommunications Administrations
