= Creidhne =

Mythological goldsmith of the Tuatha Dé Danann

In Irish mythology, Credne (Old Irish) or Creidhne (Irish pronunciation: [ˈcɾʲeːnʲə]) was the goldsmith of the Tuatha Dé Danann, but he also worked with bronze and brass. He and his brothers Goibniu and Luchtaine were known as the Trí Dée Dána, the three gods of art, who forged the weapons which the Tuatha Dé used to battle the Fomorians.

It is said that Creidhne fashioned King Nuada's silver hand, together with Dian Cecht.

Creidhne is often confused with the Irish warrior Creidne.

Of Creidne's death, according to a poem affixed to the Lebor Gabála Érenn, it was said:

Creidne the pleasant artificer was drowned

on the lake-sea, the sinister pool,

fetching treasures of noble gold,

to Ireland from Spain.
