= Niskai =

Niskai is a term used to refer to any of the water spirits and goddesses in Celtic mythology. Niskai are also considered goddesses in Neo-Paganism.
