= Bern zinc tablet =

Metal sheet found in Switzerland in 1984

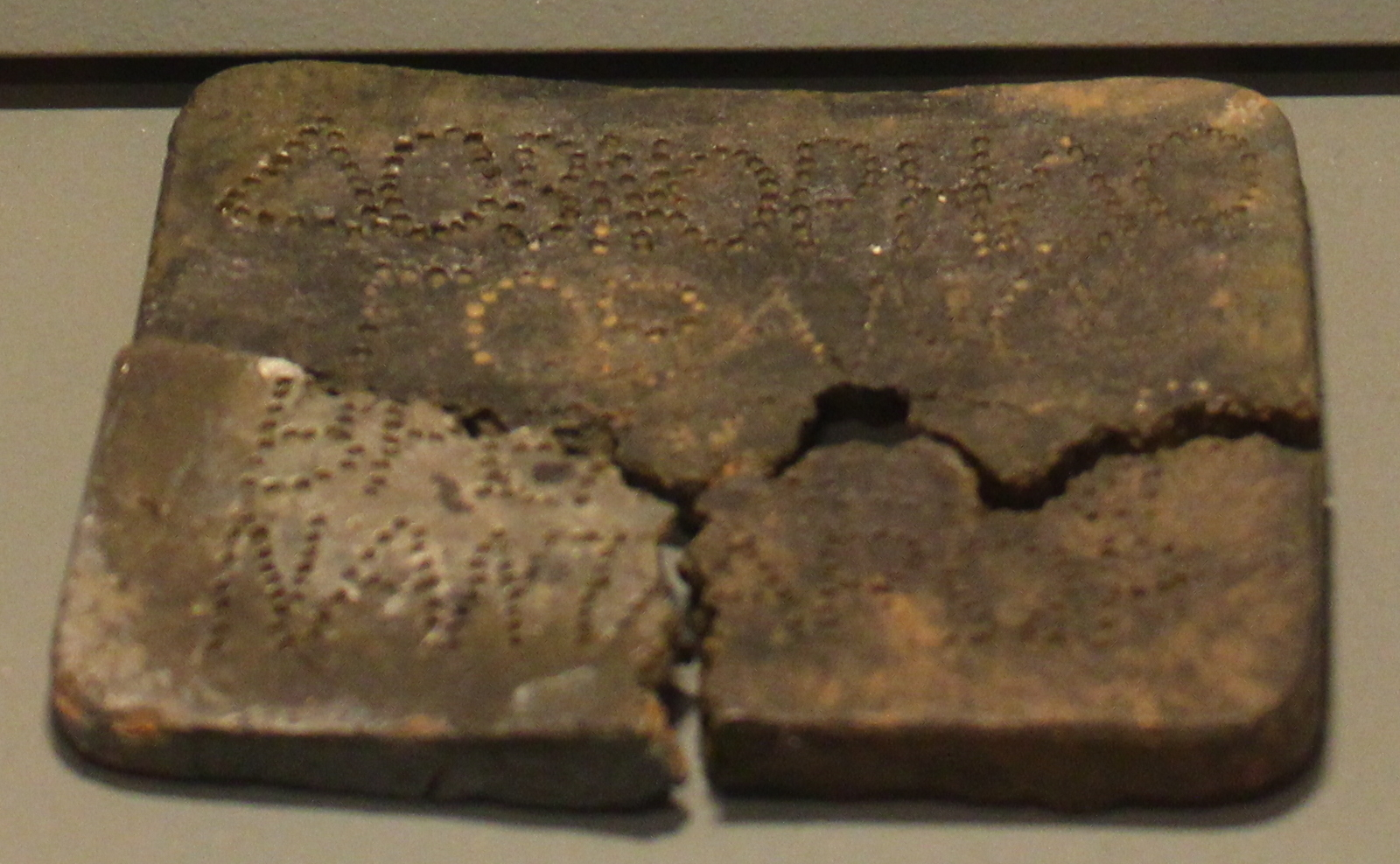
Bern zinc tablet in the Bern Historical Museum, 2019

A recreation of the tablet's message

The Bern zinc tablet or Gobannus tablet is a metal sheet found in 1984 in Bern, Switzerland. As it was only analysed after the death of the workman who had found and removed the tablet from its site, its original archaeological context can no longer be precisely determined. According to the scant information available to archaeologist Rudolf Fellmann, it was found in Thormenboden forest within what appears to be a Gallo-Roman context, a layer dominated by Roman roof tiles at a depth of roughly 30 centimetres. It is inscribed with an apparently Gaulish inscription, consisting of four words, each on its own line, the letters formed by little dots impressed onto the metal:

ΔΟΒΝΟΡΗΔΟ ΓΟΒΑΝΟ ΒΡΕΝΟΔΩΡ ΝΑΝΤΑΡΩΡ
Dobnorēdo Gobano Brenodōr Nantarōr

The dedication is to Gobannus, a Gallo-Roman god, the name simply meaning "the Smith". Brenodor is probably a placename, Brenno-duro- "town of Brennus"; compare Salodurum > Solothurn, Vitudurum > Winterthur, Gaulish -duron "town" deriving from PIE dhur- "door".

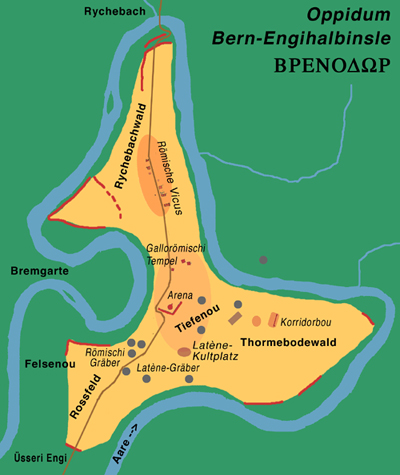
Overview map (in Swiss German) of the Gallo-Roman settlement of Bern Engehalbinsel. The tablet is thought to have been found in Thormenboden forest, in the eastern river bend.

Nantaror may refer to the Aare valley (containing as first element nanto- (Modern Welsh nant) "deep valley with a stream/river"), and Dobnoredo seems to be an epitheton of Gobano, maybe composed of dubno- "world" (Old Irish dumhan (Modern Irish domhan, cf. Dumnorix, Donald (Gaelic Domhnall) and rēdo- "travel" (Old Irish riad), or rēdā "chariot" i.e. "world-traveller" or "world-charioteer", so that the inscription may mean approximately "to Gobannus, the world-traveller, dedicated by the people of Brennoduron in the Arura valley".

Since the inscription consists of four proper names, it cannot straightforwardly be considered in the Gaulish language. The datives in -o may be either Gaulish or Latin. Use of the Greek alphabet, however, seems to suggest that when the tablet was inscribed, Roman influence was not yet overwhelming, and Gaulish probably was still in wide use. That the tablet does date to Roman Gaul is suggested by the final Ρ of ΝΑΝΤΑΡΩΡ: it was at first written as a Latin R, the additional stroke having been removed again as a scribal error. Mixing of Greek and Latin letters is also attested from a number of Gallo-Roman coins. The discovery of the tablet had a significant important on determining the etymology of the city of Bern, suggesting that the modern city continues to use a toponym of Celtic origin (possibly *berna "cleft") that pre-exists any Latin or German names.

The tablet is made of zinc, and on grounds of this it was considered a forgery for some time, since production of zinc is unattested in this region prior to the 16th century. The alloy, however, turned out to be different from modern zinc, containing lead and iron, as well as traces of copper, tin, and cadmium. It was concluded that the zinc of this tablet was collected from a furnace, where the metal is known to have aggregated, Strabo calling it pseudoarguros "mock silver" (in 1546, Georg Agricola rediscovered that a white metal could be condensed and scraped off the walls of a furnace when zinc ores were smelted), but it is believed that it was usually thrown away as worthless. Since the tablet is dedicated to the god of the smiths, it is not unlikely that such zinc remnants scraped from a furnace were collected by smiths and considered particularly smithcraft-related.
