= Luchtaine =

Irish god of art

- A god of art in Irish mythogy
- Member of Trí Dée Dána
- Other names: Luchta, Luighne

Genealogy
- Died: Moytura
- Siblings: Creidhne, Goibniu

In Irish mythology, Luchtaine (or Luchta) was the carpenter or wright of the Tuatha Dé Danann; elsewhere he is described as the son of Luachaid. He and his brothers Creidhne and Goibniu were known as the Trí Dée Dána, the three gods of art, who forged the weapons which the Tuatha Dé used to battle the Fomorians. Specifically Luchtaine agrees to make all the shields and javelin shafts required for The Second Battle of Moytura.

Referred to as Luighne, he was said to have died of a fiery dart during the Second Battle of Moytura.
