= Patricia Aakhus =

American novelist and academic (1952–2012)

- Born: Patricia McDowell; May 17, 1952; Los Angeles, California, U.S.
- Died: May 16, 2012 (aged 59); Evansville, Indiana, U.S.
- Education: University of California, Santa Cruz (BA); Norwich University (MFA)
- Occupations: Academic, writer
- Writing career
- Pen name: Patricia McDowell
- Notable awards: Cahill Award

Patricia "Patty" Aakhus (May 17, 1952 – May 16, 2012), also known by her maiden name and pseudonym Patricia McDowell, was an American novelist and director of International Studies at the University of Southern Indiana. She specialized in Irish themes and won Readercon's Best Imaginative Literature Award in 1990 and the Cahill Award for The Voyage of Mael Duin's Curragh.

== Early life and education ==
McDowell was born in Los Angeles in 1952 to Lowell and Betsy (née Nichols) McDowell, both of whom preceded her in death, as did a brother, Mark. She earned a BA from the University of California, Santa Cruz, and an MFA from Norwich University.

== Career ==
Her debut novel, The Voyage of Mael Duin's Curragh, is a retelling of the Irish legend of The Voyage of Máel Dúin. Other publications include Astral Magic in the Renaissance: Gems, Poetry and Patronage of Lorenzo de' Medici. Magic, Ritual and Witchcraft and the short story The Spy.

=== As educator ===
Aakhus was the Director of the Center for Interdisciplinary Studies and program director of International Studies at the University of Southern Indiana. She also taught classes on classical and world mythology, the history of magic, and international studies.

== Death ==
She died from cancer in Evansville, Indiana on May 16, 2012, the day before her 60th birthday. She was survived by her husband, two children, three siblings, and other members of her extended family. At that time, she was working on a contemporary novel, Dogtown.

== Bibliography ==
- The Voyage of Mael Duin's Curragh (1990); ISBN 0-934257-31-0
- Daughter of the Boyne (1992); ISBN 0-86327-349-1
- The Sorrows of Tara (1995); ISBN 0-86327-469-2
