= Creidne =

Creidne was a woman warrior of the Fianna in Irish mythology. She became the champion of a warrior band after fleeing from an incestuous relationship with her father, which produced three sons.

A legend related to the Conaille Muirtheimne states that Conall Constamail mac Finnchada fathered three sons, Rúntar, Glass and Ímda (eponyms of the Dál Rúntar, Glasraige and Dál nÍmda) upon his own daughter Creidne; out of shame he banished her and her sons; she fought against her parents and only after seven years of exile did she reach a settlement.

A sail training yacht owned by the Irish Naval Service, used as a replacement for the Asgard II, is named Creidne for the mythical warrior.
