= The Voyage of Mael Duin's Curragh =

The Voyage of Mael Duin's Curragh is a 1990 novel written by Patricia Aakhus. The novel was Aakhus's first published book, and retells the ancient Irish legend The Voyage of Máel Dúin, an adopted son of a chieftain's widow who accidentally learns of his true parents. The novel retrieved significant acclaim upon its release, including a national review by The New York Times on 28 January 1990.
