= Goibniu =

Irish god

- God of smithcraft
- Member of Tuatha Dé Danann
- Battles: The Second Battle of Mag Tuired
- Region: Ireland

Genealogy
- Parents: Tuirbe Trágmar
- Siblings: Credne; Luchta; Dian Cécht; Nuada

Equivalents
- Greek: Hephaestus
- Gaulish: Gobannus
- Welsh: Gofannon

In Irish mythology, Goibniu (Old Irish pronunciation: [ˈɡoβʲnʲu]; Modern Irish: Gaibhne Irish pronunciation: [ˈɡɨ̞vʲn̠ʲə]) was the metalsmith of the Tuatha Dé Danann. He is believed to have been a smithing god and is also associated with hospitality. His name is related to the Welsh Gofannon and the Gaulish Gobannus.

== Etymology ==
The name Goibniu stems from a Proto-Celtic form reconstructed as *Gobeniū or *Gobanniō, which is derived from the stem *goben-, meaning 'smith' (compare: Old Irish gobae, Middle Welsh gof, Middle Breton gof(f), Old Cornish gof 'smith'; also Gaulish gobedbi 'with the smiths' < *goben-bi or *gob-et-bi-). The same stem can be found in the Gaulish deity Deo Cobanno (< *Gobannos), and in Govannon (< *Gobannonos), the son of the goddess Dôn in Welsh mythology, which may suggest a common origin of the name in Proto-Celtic legends. It is also attested in various personal names, such as the Gaulish Gobannitio, Gobannicnus, or Gobano, the Old Irish Gobain (Latin: Gobanus), the Old Breton Ran Gof, as well as in the toponyms Gobannium (now Abergavenny), Govan, and Sanctus Gobanus (Saint-Gobain).

A Proto-Indo-European (PIE) origin of the stem *goben- is controversial, and some scholars have proposed that it is restricted to Celtic. It could be connected to Latin faber ('craftsman'), via PIE *g^{(w)h}ob^{h}-, although the former is generally derived from *d^{h}Hb^{h}-ro- (compare Armenian darbin). Patrizia de Bernardo Stempel has also proposed to derive it from PIE *g(h)eubh- ('curve, bend'), because bronze was melted and hammered, contrary to iron that was hammered and bended, and Václav Blažek has suggested a relation with the Lithuanian goddess of fire Gabija.

== Family ==
The name of his father appears as Esarg or Tuirbe Trágmar, the 'thrower of axes'. Goibniu is often grouped together with his two brothers Credne the silversmith and Luchta the carpenter as the Trí Dée Dána (three gods of art), who forged the weapons which the Tuath Dé used to battle the Fomorians. Alternatively, he is grouped with Credne and Dian Cecht the physician. He is explicitly named as the brother of Dian Cécht and Nuada in the Second Battle of Moytura (Mag Tuired) Goibniu's unnamed wife was said to be buried in a cave at Drogheda.

== Mythology ==
When Nuada's arm is cut off in battle, Goibniu crafts him a new one of silver; thus he is known as Nuada Airgetlám "Nuada of the Silver Arm". He also makes weapons for the gods. In the Lebor Gabála Érenn, he is described as "not impotent in smelting", and is said to have died, along with Dian Cecht, of a "painful plague". During the Second Battle of Moytura, Goibniu is speared by Brígh's son Ruadán, but he removes the spear and kills Ruadán with it.

Goibniu also acts as a hospitaller who furnishes feasts for the gods. According to the Acallam na Senórach and Altram Tige Dá Medar, the feast of Goibniu was bestowed on the warriors of the Tuatha Dé by Manannán to protect them from sickness and decay. He is said to be the owner of the Glas Gaibhnenn, the magical cow of abundance and in surviving folklore also has a magical bridle for the cow.

In the St Gall incantations, Goibniu is invoked against thorns (either literal or metaphorical):

Nothing is higher than heaven, nothing is deeper than the sea. By the holy words that Christ spake from His Cross remove from me the thorn, a thorn..... very sharp is Goibniu’s science, let Goibniu’s goad go out before Goibniu’s goad!

This charm is laid in butter which goes not into water and (some) of it is smeared all round the thorn and it (the butter) goes not on the point nor on the wound, and if the thorn be not there one of the two teeth in the front of his head will fall out.

Goibniu is believed to have appeared on earth as both the Gobán Saor, a master craftsman, and as the enchanted smith Lon mac Liomtha. He may also be the same figure as Culann.

== Folklore ==
In the folklore of Ireland, there are several figures variously named Gavida and Gavigan who play a role in the birth of Lugh. These figures are identified as smiths and own a fabulous cow, the Glas Gaibhnenn. In the story featuring Gavigan, the cow here called Glas Gavigan, is taken by Balor and only returned after Gavigan makes trees grow on Tory Island. In this tale, Gavigan is introduced to Balor's daughter and becomes the father of Lugh. In another version of the story, Gavida is named as a smith and a brother of Mac Kineely and Mac Samthainn; in this version, Mac Kineely owns the famous cow whom Balor steals and later becomes the father of Lugh.

Gaibhlen is another figure identified as the smith of the Tuatha De, who owned a gigantic cow. His furnace was located at Doire-na-tuan where he melted the ore of the iron mountain Sliabh an Iarainn. There has been a forge at that location ever since.

== See also ==
- Gobán Saor
- Gobnait
- Gofannon
- Gobannus
- Goblin
- Hephaestus
