= Gobannus =

Gallic smithing god

Gobannus (or Gobannos, the Gaulish form, sometimes Cobannus) was a Gallo-Roman smithing god.

A number of statues dedicated to him are preserved, found together with a bronze cauldron dedicated to Deus Cobannos, in the late 1980s and exported to the United States, now in the Getty Museum in the Getty Center, in California. He is mentioned in an inscription found in the 1970s in Fontenay-près-Vézelay, reading AVG(VSTO) SAC(RVM) [DE]O COBANNO, i.e. dedicated to Augustus and Deus Cobannus.

== Etymology ==
The theonym Gobannos, attested as Deo Cobanno on inscriptions, is derived from the Proto-Celtic stem *goben-, meaning 'smith' (cf. Old Irish gobae, Middle Welsh gof, Middle Breton gof(f), Old Cornish gof 'smith'; cf. also Gaulish gobedbi 'with the smiths' < *goben-bi or *gob-et-bi-). The same stem can be found in the Irish deity Goibniu (< *Gobeniū or *Gobanniō), and in Govannon (< *Gobannonos), the son of the goddess Dôn in Welsh mythology, which may suggest a common origin of the name in Proto-Celtic legends. It is also attested in various personal names, such as the Gaulish Gobannitio, Gobannicnus, or Gobano, the Old Irish Gobain (Lat. Gobanus), the Old Breton Ran Gof, as well as in the toponyms Gobannium (now Abergavenny) and Sanctus Gobanus (Saint-Gobain).

A Proto-Indo-European (PIE) origin of the stem *goben- is controversial, and some scholars have proposed that it is restricted to Celtic. It could be connected to Latin faber ('craftsman'), via PIE *g^{(w)h}ob^{h}-, although the former is generally derived from *d^{h}Hb^{h}-ro- (cf. Armenian darbin). Patrizia de Bernardo Stempel has also proposed to derive it from PIE *g(h)eubh- ('curve, bend'), because bronze was hammered and bended, contrary to iron that was melted, and Václav Blažek has suggested a relation with the Lithuanian goddess of fire Gabija.

== Gobannus tablet ==
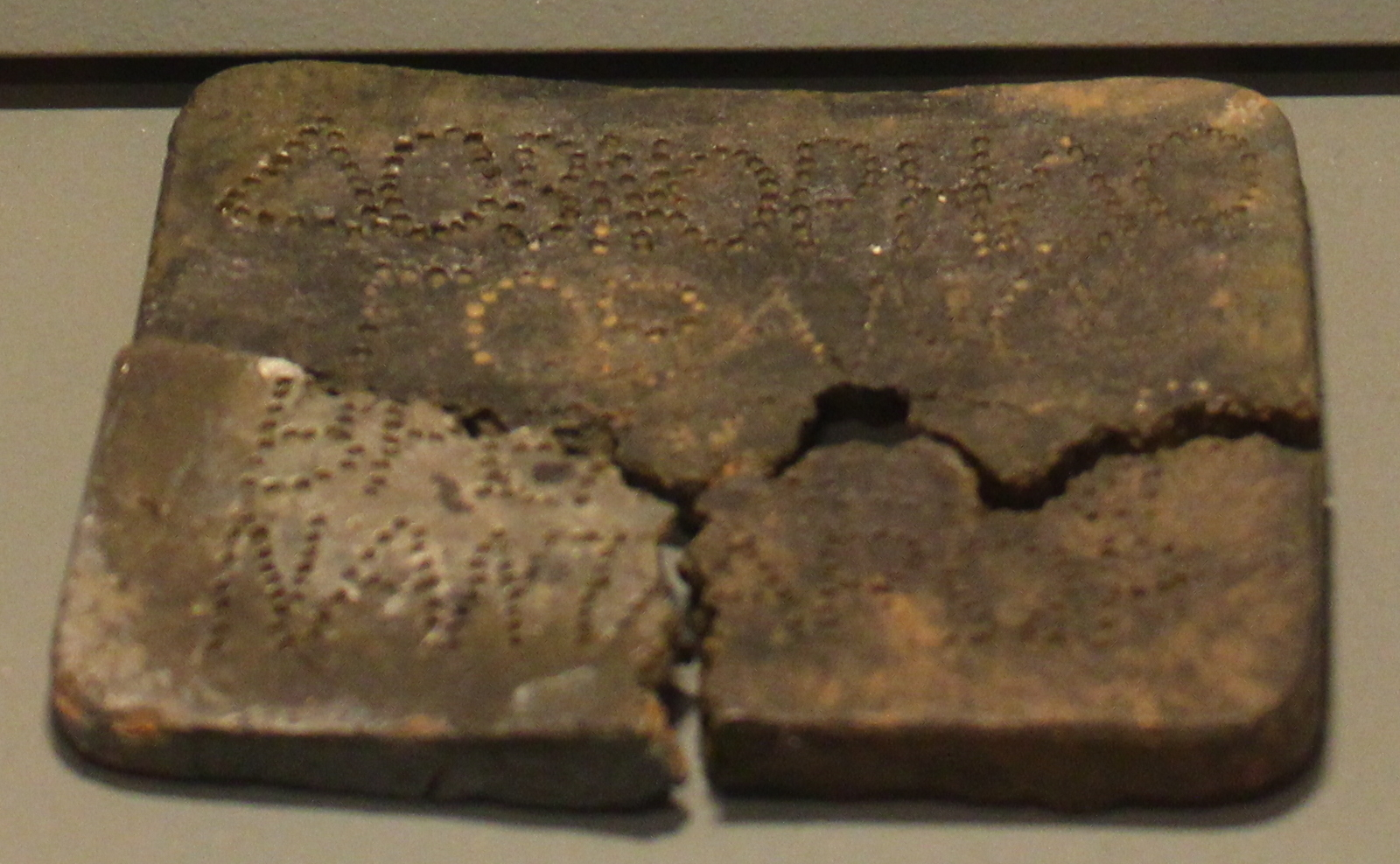
The Bern zinc tablet dedicated to Gobannus (ΓΟΒΑΝΟ) in the Bern Historical Museum, 2019

The best preserved dedication to Gobannus is found on the Bern zinc tablet, where his name is written ΓΟΒΑΝΟ (in the dative and in Greek letters). The tablet was found in the 1980s in Bern. It is inscribed with an apparently Gaulish inscription

ΔΟΒΝΟΡΗΔΟ ΓΟΒΑΝΟ ΒΡΕΝΟΔΩΡ ΝΑΝΤΑΡΩΡ

Brenodor is probably a placename ( cf. Brennus); Nantaror may refer to the Aare valley (containing as first element nanto- "valley"; cf. Cornish nans, Welsh nant). Dobnoredo seems to be an epithet of Gobano, maybe composed of dubno- "world" (Old Irish dumh, cf. Dumnorix, Donald, Devon) and rēdo- "travel" (Old Irish riad), or rēdā "chariot" i.e. "world-traveller" or "world-charioteer", so that the inscription may mean approximately "to Gobannus, the world-traveller, dedicated by the people of Brennoduron in the Arura valley".

Although called zinc, the tablet is made of an alloy that also contains lead and iron as well as traces of copper, tin and cadmium. The zinc was possibly collected from a furnace, where the metal is known to aggregate, Strabo calling it pseudoarguros "mock silver". In 1546, Georg Agricola re-discovered that a white metal could be condensed and scraped off the walls of a furnace when zinc ores were smelted, but it is believed that it was usually thrown away as worthless. Since the tablet is dedicated to the god of the smiths it is not unlikely that zinc remnants scraped from a furnace were collected by smiths and considered particularly smithcraft-related.
