= Immram =

Mythical Irish voyage tales

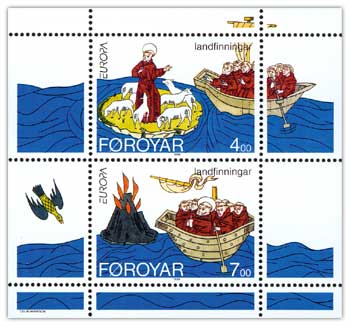
Brendan discovering the Faroes and Iceland Stamp sheet FR 252–253 of Postverk Føroya Issued: 18 April 1994 Artist: Colin Harrison

An immram (/ˈɪmrəm/; plural immrama; Irish: iomramh [ˈʊmˠɾˠəw], 'voyage') is a class of Old Irish tales concerning a hero's sea journey to the Otherworld (see Tír na nÓg and Mag Mell). Written in the Christian era and essentially Christian in aspect, they preserve elements of Irish mythology.

The immrama are identifiable by their focus on the exploits of the heroes during their search for the Otherworld, located in these cases in the islands far to the west of Ireland. The hero sets out on his voyage for the sake of adventure or to fulfill his destiny, and generally stops on other fantastic islands before reaching his destination. He may or may not be able to return home again.

== Definition ==
The immrama are often confused with a similar Irish genre, the echtrae or "adventure". Both types of story involve a hero's journey to an "otherworld", whether a Christian paradise, a fairyland, the land of the gods or a utopia. They are distinguished by date; echtrai are older, dating from the 7th century, while the earliest immram dates to the 8th century. David Dumville argues that the immrama include more Christian thinking than the more pagan genre of echtrae, and that, whereas the purpose of the echtrai is to enhance understanding of the old gods and the land in which they live, in an immram these pagan elements occur as a challenge to the hero's faith. In an echtrae the protagonist only ever goes to one location and may arrive in the otherworld with no explanation of the journey, whereas in an immram the hero always has multiple adventures on several islands.

== Stories ==
Originally there were seven officially recognised Immram listed in a list of ancient texts. Of those seven only three survive: The Voyage of Máel Dúin, The Voyage of the Uí Chorra, and The Voyage of Snedgus and Mac Riagla. The Voyage of Bran is classified in these same lists as an echtrae, though it also contains the essential elements of the immrama. The later Latin Voyage of St. Brendan also contains a voyage across the sea to various otherworldly islands.

== Origins ==
Immrama were first recorded as early as the 7th century by monks and scholars who fled Continental Europe before the barbarian invaders of the fifth century. These monks carried the learning of Western Europe and became the vanguard of the Christianizing of Europe. On this account it is expected that Immram have their origins in pre-existing Christian voyage literature, pre-existing Celtic legends, or classical stories the monks would have known. The origins of these stories are attributed to three sources of preexisting stories: Irish myths, Christian genres, and Classic Stories.

The Otherworld in The Voyage of Bran is a distinctly Celtic feature but this is easily overlooked because the concept of the Christian paradise and the Irish Otherworld are closely related. This difference is highlighted in the difference between sinless and sexless in the native and Christian mindset, like in the existing translation where an author may have turned the "Isle of Woman" into a chaste society, with some difficulty. Such an example was with a passage that described a man and a woman playing under a bush without sin or blame. This passage in light of several others emphasises a Christian effort to create a sinless and sexless Otherworld.

Immrama may have borrowed heavily from preexisting Christian genres, such as the sanctae vitae (saints' lives), the Liturgy (pilgrimage stories), and the vision tales. As early as the 5th century Irish monks would go on a pilgrimage, a peregrination, sailing from island to island seeking isolation where they would meditate and purge themselves of their sins. The source of inspiration behind the Immram may also be the Christian punishment of sending people adrift for their crimes to be judged by God. Perhaps the largest piece of evidence that immrama are Christian works is that the characters in the story are generally wandering priests, monks, and nuns, or at least related to them.

One of the first Celticists, Heinrich Zimmer, attempted to link the immram with the Aeneid and the Odyssey. Some of the parallels they make are between the Ambrose in the tales who bestow immortality on their lovers for the time they remain with them and the giant sheep on islands in both stories. These parallels have since been debunked by William Flint Thrall.

On top of their literary and mythological precedents, some scholars have argued that the immrama may be exaggerated retelling of historical voyages. The early Irish, particularly monks (see papar), were certainly far-travelled, reaching the Orkney, Shetland, Faroe Islands at an early date and perhaps even reaching Iceland. Some places and things referenced in the immrama and the Brendan tale have been associated with real islands and real things, for instance Brendan's crystal pillar has been suggested to refer to an iceberg.

== Influence ==
=== Literature ===
- Gulliver's Travels was obviously inspired by the Immram tradition.
- Anatole France satirised the Immram genre in the early part of his 1908 Penguin Island (French: L'Île des Pingouins).
- Lord Dunsany, an inspiration for C. S. Lewis, wrote "Idle Days on the Yann" about sailors on a search for a mythical ivory gate.
- The Immrama have been proposed as part inspiration for both C. S. Lewis's The Voyage of the Dawn Treader, and the poem Imram by contemporary J.R.R. Tolkien.
- Australian author Patrick Holland's novel Navigatio is a 21st Century Immram that re-imagines the Brendan Voyage. It accretes contradictory and repetitive episodes to create the impression of an unredacted collection of medieval texts.

=== Other ===
The popularity of The Voyage of St. Brendan inspired Tim Severin to undertake a voyage using 5th century technology to demonstrate that the early Irish could have made it as far as North America.

== See also ==
- Land of Maidens
- Saint Brendan's Island
- Great Ireland
- Brasil (mythical island)
- Avalon

== Sources ==
- O'Curry, Eugene (1861), Lectures on the Manuscript Materials of Ancient Irish History, delivered at the Catholic University of Ireland, during the sessions of 1855 and 1856, Dublin : William A. Hinch
- Thrall, William Flint (December 1917), "Vergil's "Aeneid" and the Irish "Imrama:" Zimmer's Theory", Modern Philology, 15 (8): 449–474, doi:10.1086/387145, JSTOR 433138, S2CID 161526777
- Byrne, Mary E.. (1932), "On the Punishment of Sending Adrift", Ériu, 11: 97–102, JSTOR 30008090
- Dumville, David N. (1976), "Echtrae and Immram: Some Problems of Definition", Ériu, 27: 73–94, JSTOR 30007669
- MacKillop, James (1998), Dictionary of Celtic Mythology, Oxford, ISBN 978-0-19-860967-4
- Wooding, Jonathan, ed. (2000b), The Otherworld Voyage in Early Irish Literature: An Anthology of Criticism, Four Courts Press, ISBN 978-1-85182-246-1
  - O'Meara, J. J., In the Wake of the Saint: The Brendan Voyage, an Epic Crossing of Atlantic by Leather Boat, pp. 109–112
  - Mac Cana, Proinsia, The Sinless Otherworld of Immram Brain, pp. 52–72
  - Wooding, M. Jonathan., Monastic Voyaging and the Nauigatio, pp. 226–245
- Moylan, Tom (2007), "Irish voyages and visions: pre-figuring, re-configuring Utopia", Utopian Studies, 18 (3), Irish Utopian: 299–323, doi:10.2307/20719879, JSTOR 20719879
