= The Voyage of Máel Dúin =

Medieval Old Irish epic

The Voyage of Máel Dúin (Old Irish: Immram Maele Dúin, Modern Irish: 'Iomramh Maoile Dhúin') an Old Irish immram, a type of tale of a sea voyage, dating to the 9th century. The protagonist is Máel Dúin, the son of Ailill Edge-of-Battle, whose murder provides the initial impetus for the tale.

== Sources ==
The story belongs to the group of Irish romances, the immrama, or tales of sea voyages. The immrama are distinguished from the echtrae, another class of stories of adventures to the underworld.

The text exists in an 11th-century redaction, by a certain Aed the Fair, described as the "chief sage of Ireland," but it may be gathered from internal evidence that the tale itself dates back to the 8th century. Imram Curaig Mailduin is preserved, in each case imperfectly, in the Lebor na hUidre, a manuscript in the Royal Irish Academy, Dublin; and in the Yellow Book of Lecan, MS. H. 216 in the Trinity College Library, Dublin; fragments are in Harleian MS. 5280 and Egerton MS. 1782 in the British Museum.

== Narrative ==
=== Early life ===
Máel Dúin was the son of warrior chieftain Ailill Ochair Aghra, or in certain genealogies Maelfitric. His mother was a nun raped by Ailill. Shortly after, Ailill was killed by marauders from Leix who burned a church down on him. His mother then fostered Máel Dúin with the Queen of Eoganacht. He grew into an attractive warrior who was "victorious over everyone in every game they used to play, both in running and leaping and spear casting and casting stones and racing horses." A jealous youth exposed to him the truth of his unknown kindred, saying to Máel Dúin "whose clan and kindred no one knows, whose mother and father no one knows, vanquish us in every game." All this time Máel Dúin thought he was the son of the king and queen. He refused to eat or drink with the king and queen until he was told who his birth mother was. The queen sent him to his biological mother who told him about the death of his father (Ch. I–).

He travelled to the graveyard of the church of Dubcluain where Briccne, a poison-tongued man of the community of the church, tells him that it is Máel Dúin's duty to go out and avenge his father's murder. Máel Dúin seeks the advice of a druid named Nuca at Corcomroe, who tells him how to find the murderers.

=== Máel Dúin and his foster brothers ===
Shortly after Máel Dúin and his crew set off on their voyage, they came across the harbour of his three stepbrothers. They call out to Máel Dúin, in hopes that Máel Dúin would allow them to enter his boat. Knowing he could not exceed the number of people on his boat per the druid's advice, Máel Dúin responds, "Get you home, for even though we should return (to land), only the number we have here shall go with me." Upon hearing Máel Dúin's call, his foster brothers cried out, "We will go after thee into the sea and be drowned therein, unless thou come unto us." Suddenly the foster brothers jumped out into the sea and began swimming far from land. Máel Dúin turned his boat around and allowed them on board, violating the number of allotted people on his boat. They first encounter two bare islands with forts on them. From the forts can be heard "noise and the outcry of drunkenness." Máel Dúin then hears one man say, "It was I who slew Ailill Ochair of Agha and burned Dubcluain on him and no evil has been done to me for it yet by his kindred..." Máel Dúin and his crew cannot venture to the island due to wind. He suggests that God will bring the boat where it needs to go. However, the boats sails into the limitless ocean. The presence of the foster brothers are blamed for the unfavorable winds.

=== Islands encountered ===
- The island of ants, from which the men flee because the ants' intention is to eat their boat
- The island of tame birds
- The island of the horse-like beast who pelts the crew with the beach
- The island of horses and demons
- The island of salmon, where they find an empty house filled with a feast and they all eat, drink, and give thanks to Almighty God.
- The island with the branch of an apple tree, where they are fed with apples for 40 nights
- The island of the "Revolving Beast", a creature that would shift its form by manipulating its bones, muscles, and loose skin; it casts stones at the escaping crew and one pierces the keel of the boat
- The island where animals bite each other and blood is everywhere
- The island of apples, pigs, and birds
- The island with the great fort/pillars/cats where one of the foster brothers steals a necklet and is burned to ashes by the cat
- The island of black and white sheep, where sheep change colours as they cross the fence; the crewmen do not go aboard this island for fear of changing colour
- The island of the swineherd, which contained an acidic river and hornless oxen
- The island of the ugly mill and miller, who were "wrinkled, rude, and bareheaded"
- The island of lamenting men and wailing sorrows, where they had to retrieve a crewman who entered the island and became one of the lamenting men; they saved him by grabbing him while holding their breath
- The island with maidens and intoxicating drink
- The island with forts and the crystal bridge, where there is a maiden who is propositioned to sleep with Máel Dúin
- The island of colourful birds singing like psalms
- The island with the psalm-singing old man with noble monastic words
- The island with the golden wall around it
- The island of angry smiths

The crew voyaged on and came across a sea like a green crystal. Here, there were no monsters but only rocks. They continued on and came to a sea of clouds with underwater fortresses and monsters.

- The island with a woman pelting them with nuts
- The island with a river sky that was raining salmon
- The island on a pedestal
- The island with eternal youth/women (17 maidens)
- The island with red fruits that were made as a sleeping elixir
- The island with monks of Brendan Birr, where they were blessed
- The island with eternal laughter, where they lost a crewman
- The island of the fire people

They find a man in the sea from Tory (Toraigh). He was cast there as punishment. He asks them to throw their wealth into the ocean. He prophesies that they will "reach their country, it will be sage thus; though you will meet your enemies, you will not slay them."

- The island of cattle, oxen, and sheep

=== Conclusion ===
They finally make it back to the original island of the murderers. Máel Dúin recounts the marvels that God has revealed to them on their journey. They all make peace.

== Intertextuality ==
Intertextuality is the relationship between texts, in the way similar or related texts influence, reflect, or differ from each other. The Voyage of Máel Dúin, contains motifs elected in other immrama such as: The Voyage of Bran and the Voyage of Saint Brendan.

- The Island of Joy in paragraph 61 of The Voyage of Bran may have inspired Máel Dúin's Island of Uncontrollable Laughter.
- In both Máel Dúin and the Voyage of Brendan three additional people join the crew. Máel Dúin is joined by his foster brothers; Brendan by three extra monks. In both instances these additions upset the equilibrium of the voyage, and it is when the extra persons are no longer on board, can each voyage be completed.
- Chapter 11 of Máel Dúin: On the island the crew finds a great fort and tall white pillars. The crew goes into the largest of the houses and finds it empty except for a cat playing on four stone pillars, leaping from one pillar to the next. They see many gold artifacts in the house, including golden necklets. One of the three foster brothers asks to take a golden necklet, to which Máel Dúin replies no. Nevertheless, he steals one anyway. “The cat followed them and leapt through him like a fiery arrow and burns him so that he became ashes.” This is similar to chapter 7 of The Voyage of Brendan when one of the late-coming monks takes a silver brooch despite Brendan's warning and to paragraph 65 of The Voyage of Bran when one of the crew leaps from the ship and turns to ash once he touches dry land.
- Chapter 18 of Máel Dúin: The crew hears "a great cry and chant" coming from the north-east direction after they sail away from an island. They row for almost two days to find the sound, which is described as sounding like psalms being sung. Eventually, they locate the source, and discover a mountainous island full of colorful birds making loud noises. This event is similar to an event in the "Voyage of Saint Brendan". Brendan and his crew also hear sounds like psalms being sung, and also discover an island full of birds. A major difference between the two events is that in Brendan's tale, these birds are described as praising the Lord directly, whereas in Máel Dúin's tale, the birds are initially described as making psalm like sounds, but ultimately are determined to be just "shouting and speaking loudly". There is less of a religious influence found in the Máel Dúin version of the event compared to Brendan's rendition.

== Christian elements ==
Hans Oskamp suggests that Máel Dúin is the earliest imramm to use Christian and non-Christian elements indiscriminately. Elva Johnston pointed out that the delay caused by the extra passengers gives Máel Dúin time to reconsider his intended revenge, and is therefore instrumental in his salvation. Mael Dúin's gratitude to God for preserving him in the face of the many dangers encountered on the voyage transcends his need for vengeance.

== Adaptions and derivative works ==
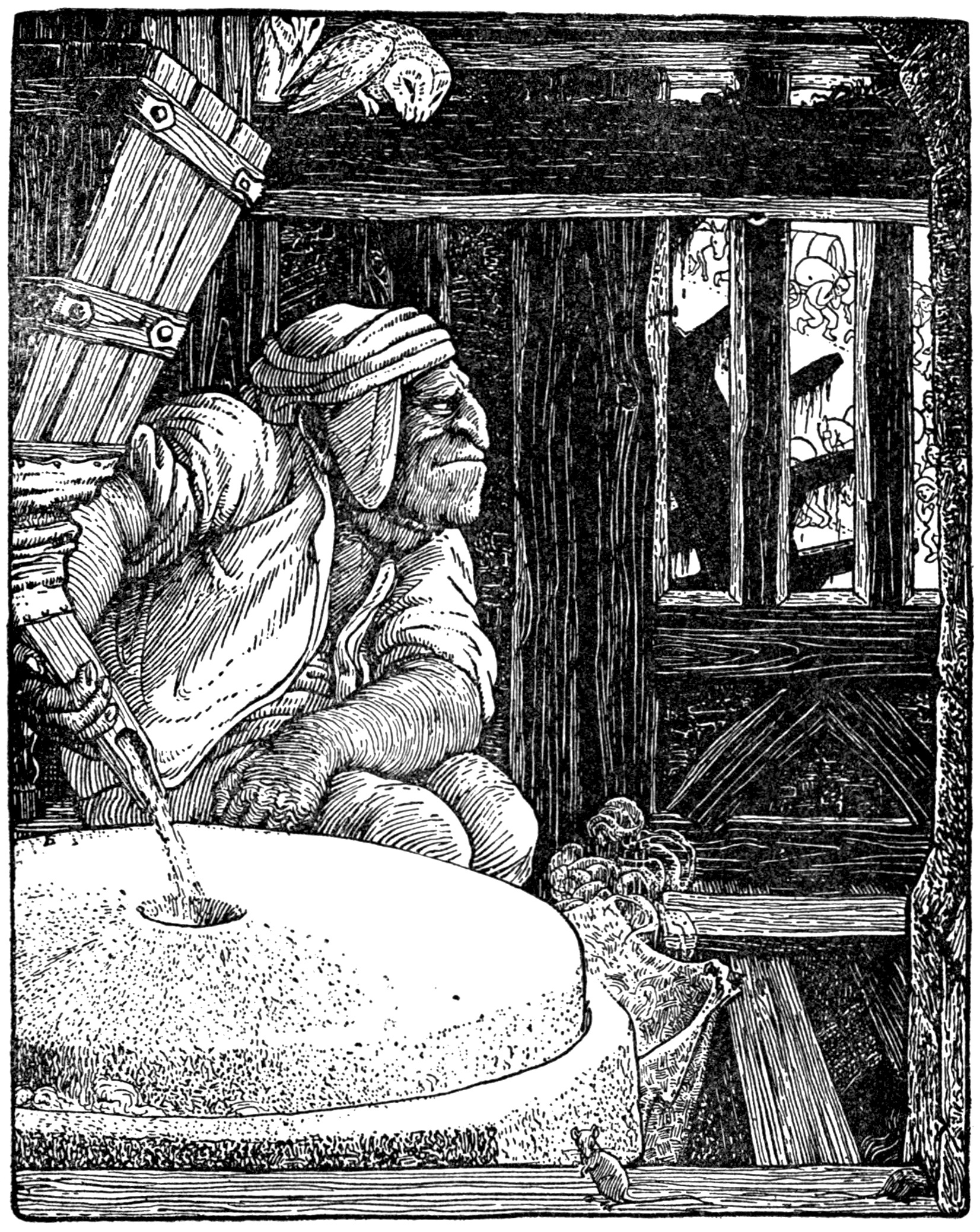
"The mill of Grudging" by John D. Batten, in Joseph Jacobs' The Book of Wonder Voyages

- Tennyson's Voyage of Maeldune, suggested by the Irish romance, borrows little more than its framework.
- Thomas Wentworth Higginson loosely adapted the tale into a short story Maelduin's Voyage with 'Maelduin' as an Irish Knight sent on a voyage by a wizard.
- Joseph Jacobs edited a faithful version of the tale suitable for children, illustrated by John D. Batten, in the Book of Wonder Voyages.
- 'James' (John Morris) Reeves adapted and abridged Patrick W. Joyce's 19th-century translation as a short children's novel, Maildun the Voyager (Hamish Hamilton, 1971), illustrated by John Lawrence.
- Irish writer Patricia Aakhus created a novelised account of the story, The Voyage of Mael Duin's Curragh, published 1989.
- A Celtic Odyssey by Michael Scott is a modern retelling of this story.
- Máel Dúin is the inspiration of "Maeldun", a sorcerer mentioned in the Myth series of computer games.
- Scots harpist and storyteller Robin Williamson recorded his own adaptation of "The Voyage of Maelduin" on his CD <ref>Gems of Celtic Story–Two <ref>in 1998 (Pig's Whisker Music, PWMD5009).
