= Ballycrovane Ogham Stone =

- Cloch Oghaim Bhéal an Churraigh Bháin (Irish)
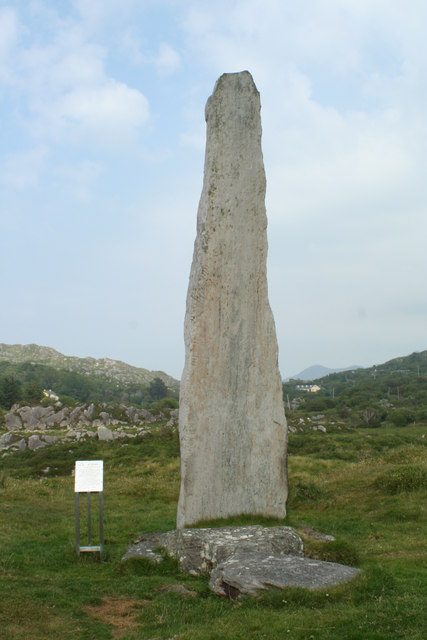

- Location within Ireland
- 51.713056°N 9.944167°W
- Type: Ogham stone
- Location: Faunkill and the Woods, Ardgroom, County Cork, Ireland

History
- Built: AD 300–600

Site notes
- Elevation: 9 m (30 ft)
- Height: 5.3 m (17 ft)

National monument of Ireland
- Official name: Ballycrovane
- Reference no.: 426

Ballycrovane Ogham Stone (CIIC 66) is an ogham stone and National Monument located in County Cork, Ireland.

== Location ==
Ballycrovane Ogham Stone stands in a field 4.3 km (2.7 mi) east-southeast of Ardgroom, overlooking Kenmare Bay.

== History ==
This is the tallest known Ogham stone, carved in the 4th–6th century AD. The stone was probably placed on the site long before the carvings were made.

== Description ==
Ballycrovane Ogham Stone is a pillar of stone measuring 470 × 102 × 32 cm and has Ogham carvings incised on two edges.

᚛ᚋᚐᚊᚔ ᚇᚓᚉᚉᚓᚇᚇᚐᚄ ᚐᚃᚔ ᚈᚒᚏᚐᚅᚔᚐᚄ᚜
MAQI- DECCEDDAS AVI TURANIAS
"of Mac-Deichet Uí Thorna"
