= The Voyage of the Uí Chorra =

Mythical Irish story

The Voyage of the Uí Chorra (Irish: Immram curaig húa Corra, literally, "the voyage of the coracle of the sons of O'Corra") is one of the three surviving Immrama, or ancient Irish voyage tales. The Immram curaig húa Corra is found in three manuscripts, all in the library of the RIA. It tells the story of the three sons of Connall ua Corra, a landowner of Connacht, who had made a bargain with the Devil before their birth. The three sons grew up to become leaders of a notorious gang of bandits who targeted the churches of the province, until they were struck by a vision and repented their ways. The penitent three proceeded to the monastery of St. Finnian of Clonard, who instructed them to repair every church they had destroyed. As a final act of contrition, on the advice of St. Coman of Kinvara, the keeper of the last church they repaired, the three brothers set out on an Atlantic Ocean voyage on a small boat (a currach), accompanied by five others (a bishop, a priest, a deacon, a musician and the craftsman who built the boat).

The nine travelers proceeded on their fantastic ocean journey, hopping from legendary island to island, encountering different peoples and fantastic adventures along the way (told as allegories of Christian morality). The nine wanderers eventually reached the coast of Iberian Peninsula, where they settled down and built a church.

According to the legend, the Bishop eventually left the settlement and went to Rome, accompanied by one of the youths. They then proceeded back to Ireland, and related the story of their adventures, where it was eventually written down in the form of a poem.

The story is echoed and may be related to the 12th Century Andalusian Arab story, told by al-Idrisi, of the eight Maghurin (Wanderers) of Lisbon, who set out on a boat on an Atlantic voyage, and also encountered mysterious islands. Some of the islands they visit may also have counterparts in Norse seafarer legends.
