= The Voyage of Snedgus and Mac Riagla =

The Voyage of Snedgus and Mac Riagla is one of the three surviving Immrama, or ancient Irish voyage tales.
