= Echtra =

Type of Old Irish literature

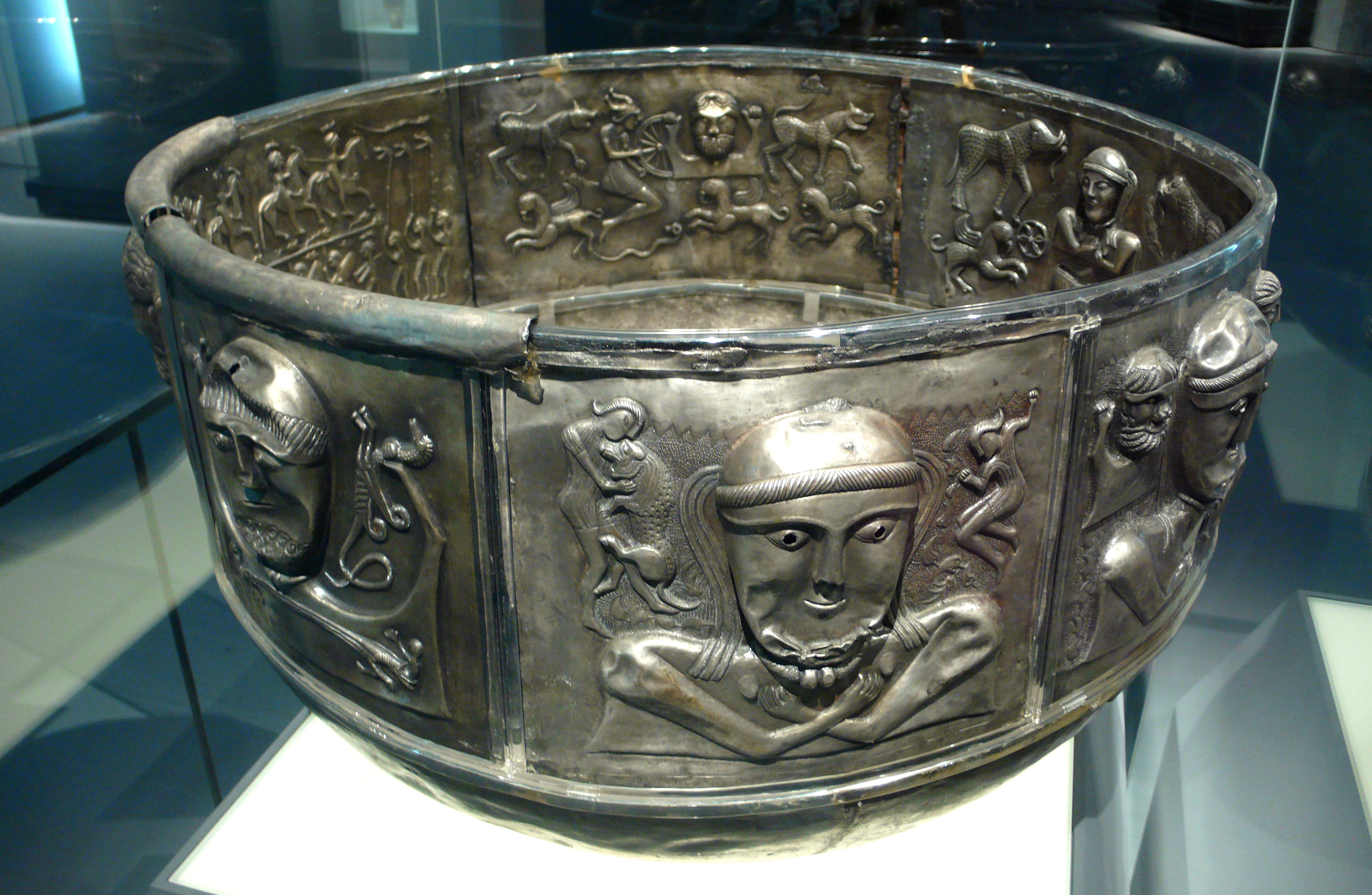

The echtra or echtrae (plural echtrai) is a type of tale in early Irish literature about a hero's adventures in the Otherworld. The echtra is distinct from another class of Irish tales of otherworldly adventures, the immram, which depict sea voyages.

== Definition and etymology ==
Generally, echtra was the Old Irish word for "expedition", "outing", "adventure", etc. The word in Middle and Modern Irish is eachtra. But in the context of the literary genre, the echtra has specific features that distinguish it from other tales of adventures in the Otherworld, in particular the immram. According to David Dumville, the echtrai reflect a particularly pagan context and Ireland's secular literary traditions. The Otherworld in these tales features deities, beings and terminology specific to pre-Christian Irish mythology. While the earliest extant tales were written down in the Christian Middle Ages, the echtra as a genre may be a more ancient Celtic tale type.

By contrast, the immrama are frame tales in which a sea voyage binds together adventures on various otherworldy islands. While these adventures include material drawn from Celtic tradition, they also heavily reflect classical and ecclesiastical sources, suggesting they are the work of authors in medieval Ireland's monasteries and clerical communities. The major point of contention in absolute definition between the echtra and immram is the tale Imram Brain mac Febail. The extant versions involve a sea voyage with multiple strange encounters as in typical immrama, but it features a distinctly pagan otherworld and other elements characteristic of the echtrai. According to Dumville, the confusion comes from the tale's convoluted textual history; it appears the original lost version was a traditional echtra about Bran's adventure to the Land of Women, to which scribes at a much later time introduced substantial additions and changes.

== Description ==
Though echtrai often involve a journey to an otherworld, the exact destination or journey can vary – voyages take place by sea in Echtrae Conli; in a journey underneath a lake in Echtrae Laegairi; or into a fairy mound (Sidhe) in Echtrae Nerai; alternatively the story may not include such a journey but instead involve an interaction with otherworldly beings: in Echtrae Nerai, set on Samhain, the hero Nera sees prophetic visions whilst in the presence of a hanged man; whilst in Echtra Mac nEchach Muid-medóin, the hero Níall gains the sovereignty of Ireland by kissing a hag guarding a well.

== Works ==
Lists compiled from (Dumville 1976), (Duignan 2010):

- Echtra Condla (or Echtrae Chonnlai, adventure of Conle)
- Echtrae Cormaic maic Airt i Tir Tairngiri
- Echtrae Laegairi maic Crimthann
- Echtrae Nerai (aka Táin Bó Aingen)
- Ectra Airt maic Cuinn
- Echtrae mac nEchach Mugmedoin

Tales not titled Echtra, but considered part of milieu include:

- Baile in Scáil (The Phantom's Frenzy)
- The Five Lugaids
- Tochmarc Emire
- Serglige Con Chulainn
- Siaburcharpat Con Culaind
- Imram Bran

Lost tales include:

- Echtrae Con Culainn
- Echtrae Chrimthaind Nia Nair
- Echtrae Fiamain
- Echtrae Con Roi
- Echtrae Chonaill
- Echtrae Chonchobair
- Echtrae Machae ingine Aeda Ruaid
- Echtrae Nechtain maic Alfroinn
- Echtrae Ailchm d maic Amalgaid
- Echtrae Find i nDerc Ferna
- Echtrae Aedain maic Gabrain
- Echtrae Mael Uma maic Baitain
- Echtrae Mongain maic Fiachna
- Echtrae Fergussa maic Leti
- Echtrae Oengusae maic Fergusa Finn
- Echtrae Chuinn Chetchathaig
- Echtrae Muirquertoig maic hErco

There are also visits to the otherworld undertaken by the hero Cuchulainn, including : Forfess Fer Fálgae, Fled Bricrenn ocus Loinges mac nDuil Dermait, and Compert Con Culainn
