= Erytheia (mythology) =

Various mythological Greek characters

In Greek mythology, Erythia or Erytheia or Erythea (Ancient Greek: Ερυθεια from erythos "red") may refer to the following figures:

- Erythia, also called Erytheis (Ερυθεις), one of the Hesperides (Nymphs of the West).
- Erythia, daughter of Geryon and mother, by Hermes, of Norax, the man who led the Iberians to Sardinia.
- Erythia, the home of the above three-bodied giant Geryon.
