= Hestia (disambiguation) =

Hestia is the Greek goddess of the hearth.

Hestia may also refer to:

- Hestia Tobacco, American tobacco company
- 46 Hestia, an asteroid
- Hestia (novel), a 1979 science fiction novel by C. J. Cherryh
- Hestia (character), a fictional character in the light novel series Is It Wrong to Try to Pick Up Girls in a Dungeon? and its derived works.
- Hestia, the "tenth planet" in the comic series Judge Dredd
- Hestia, an informal name used from 1955 to 1975 for Himalia, a moon of Jupiter
- Hestia longifolia a plant species from Southeast Asia
- Hestia is the name of one of the Hesperides

== See also ==
- The Hestia Tapestry, a 6th-century AD Byzantine tapestry
- Estia, a Greek newspaper
