= Meidias Hydria =

Ancient Greek vase in the British Museum

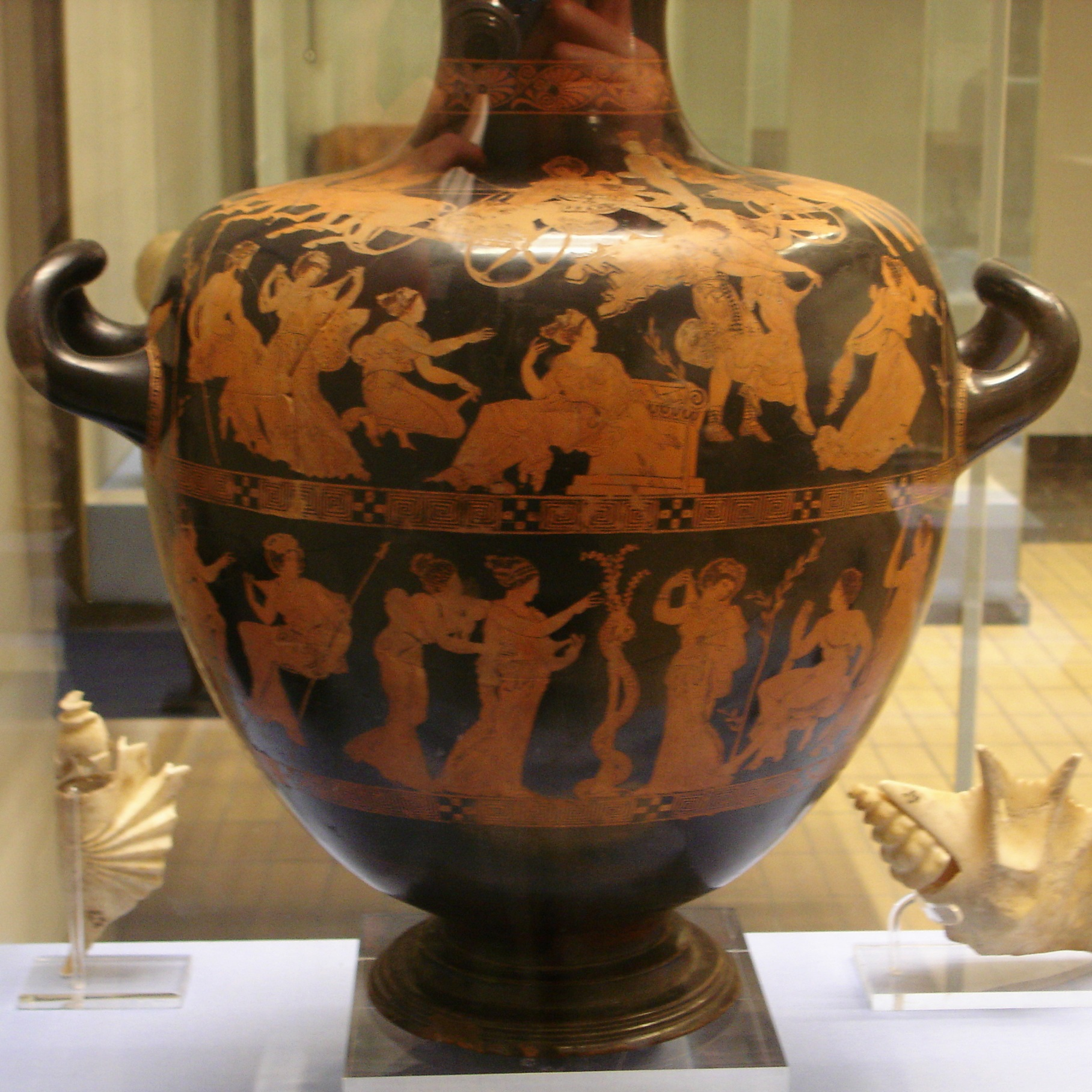
- The Meidias Hydria displayed in the British Museum
- Material: Ceramic
- Size: 52cm high, 47.3cm wide
- Writing: Ancient Greek
- Created: 420-400 BC
- Discovered: c. 1760s southern Italy
- Present location: British Museum, London
- Identification: 1772,0320.30

The Meidias Hydria is an ancient Greek red-figured hydria (water-jar) designed by the Meidias Painter. Once owned by the British diplomat Sir WIlliam Hamilton, in whose collection it took pride of place, it was sold to the British Museum in 1772. The famous German art historian Johann Joachim Winckelmann described it as 'the finest and most beautiful drawing in the world' when he saw this ancient Greek vessel's painted decoration.

== Description ==
The Meidias Hydria shows two mythological scenes: the upper register depicts the abduction of the daughters of Leucippus by the Dioscuri (Castor and Pollux), while the lower register shows Heracles in the Garden of the Hesperides. In 1839, German archaeologist Eduard Gerhard identified the Greek inscriptions on the vase, which included a signature from the potter Meidias, leading to the vase's name and furthering the study of the Meidias Painter.

== Provenance ==
The hydria was excavated from an Etruscan tomb in southern Italy in the 1760s and soon after entered the collection of Sir William Hamilton. It was originally made in Attica, central Greece and transported to southern Italy near Naples in ancient times. Hamilton later sold the vase to the British Museum in 1772. Since its acquisition 250 years ago, this masterpiece of the potter's art has been a centrepiece of the British Museum's galleries of ancient Greece.

== Gallery ==
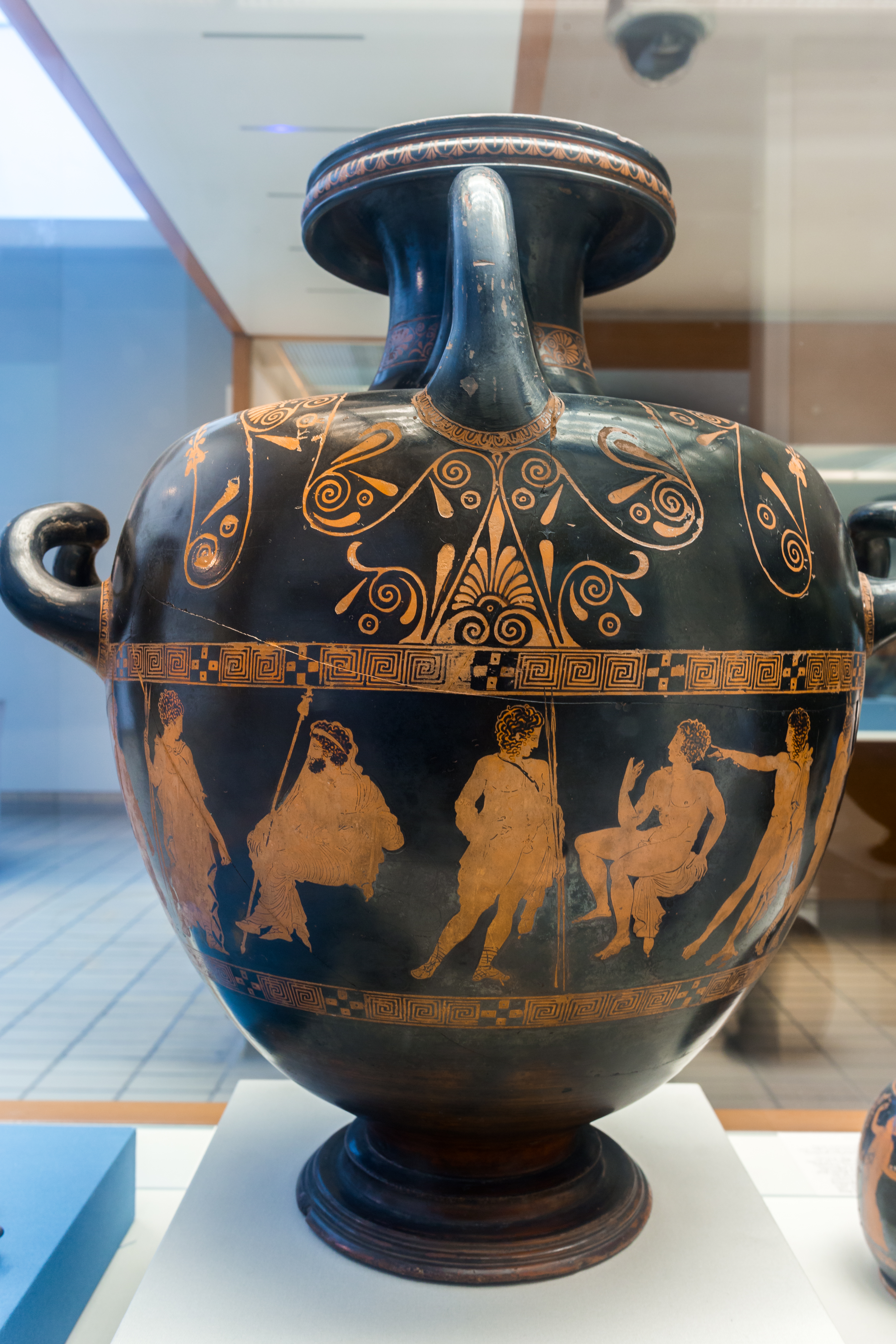
Side view of the vase

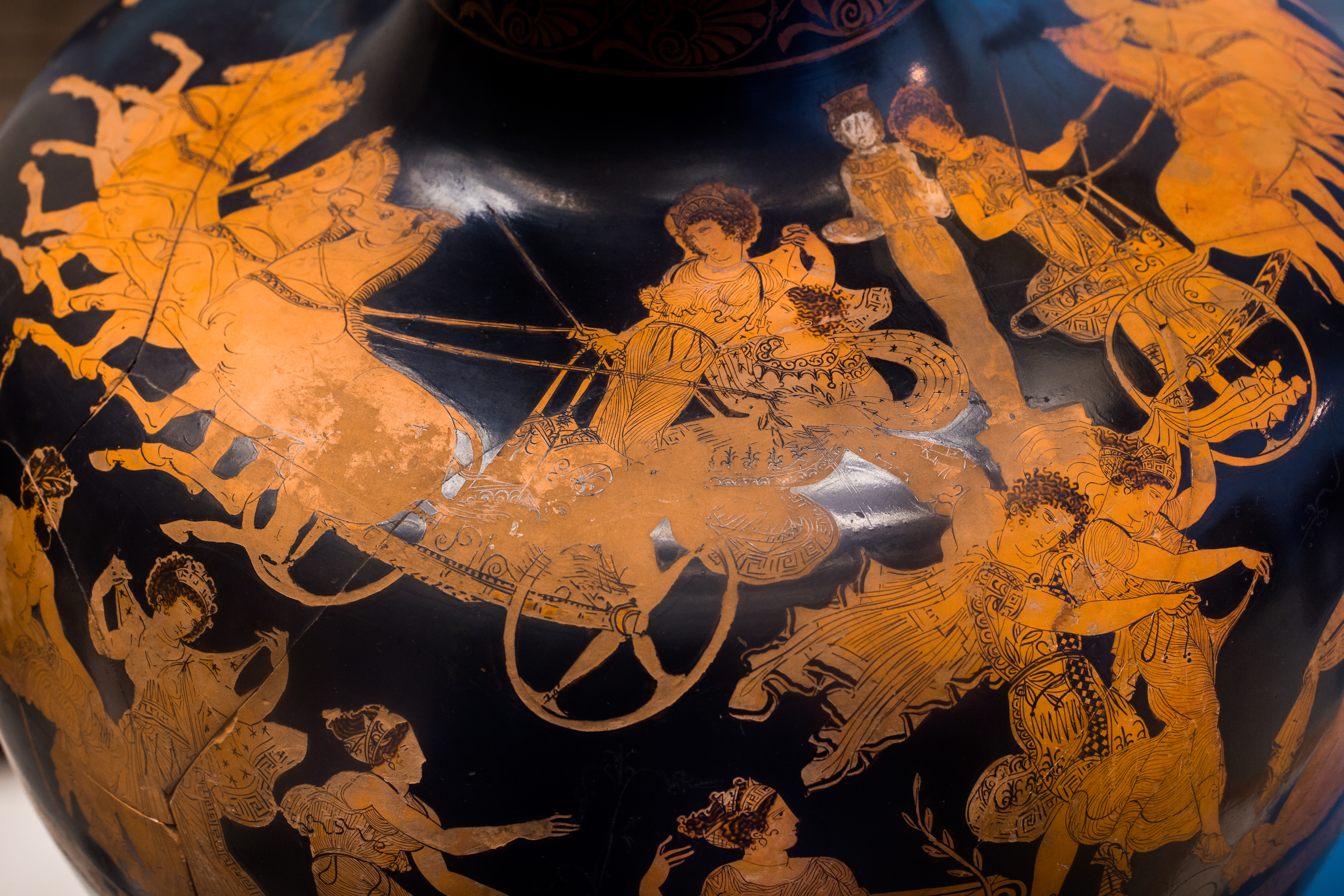
Detail of the vase

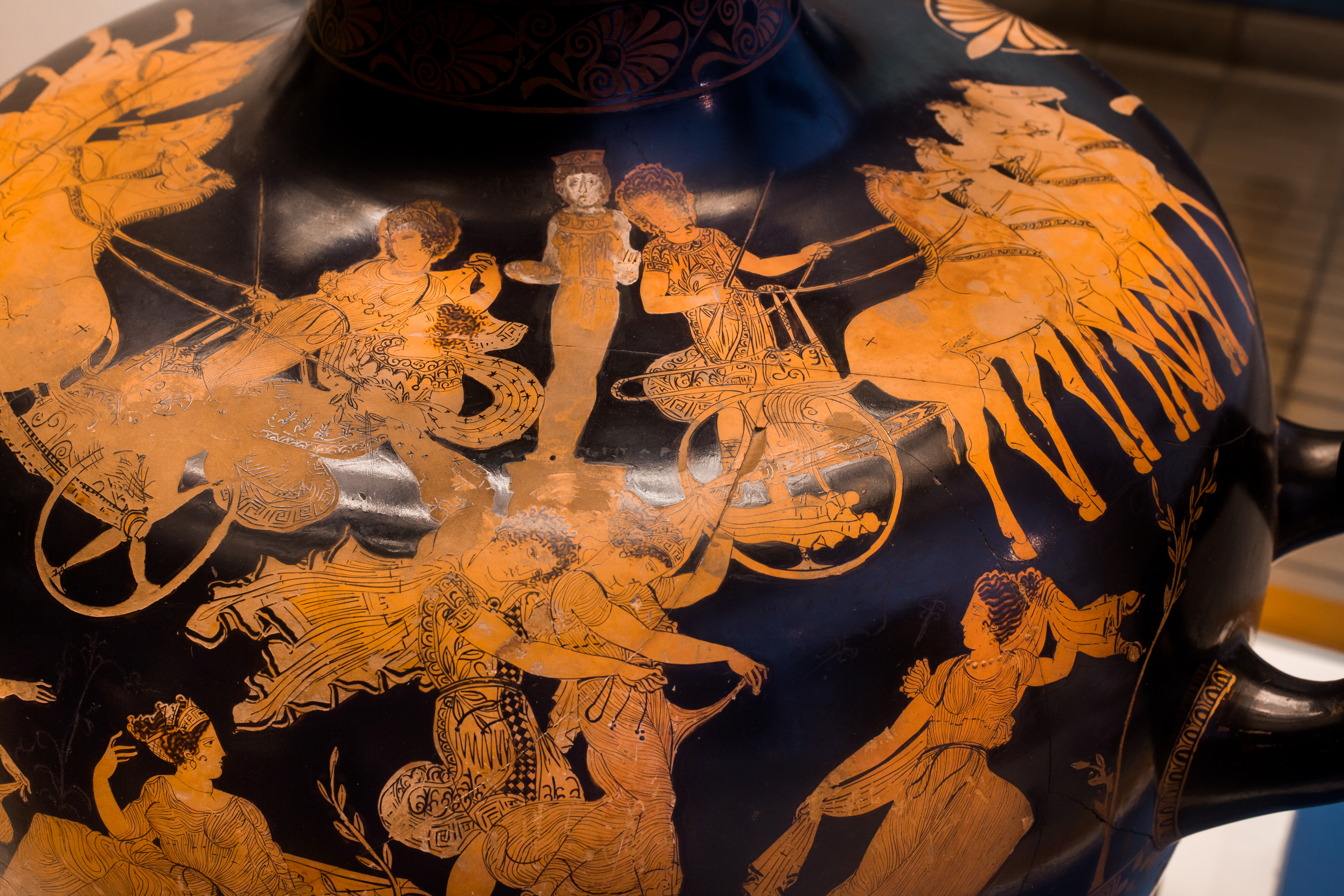
Detail of the vase

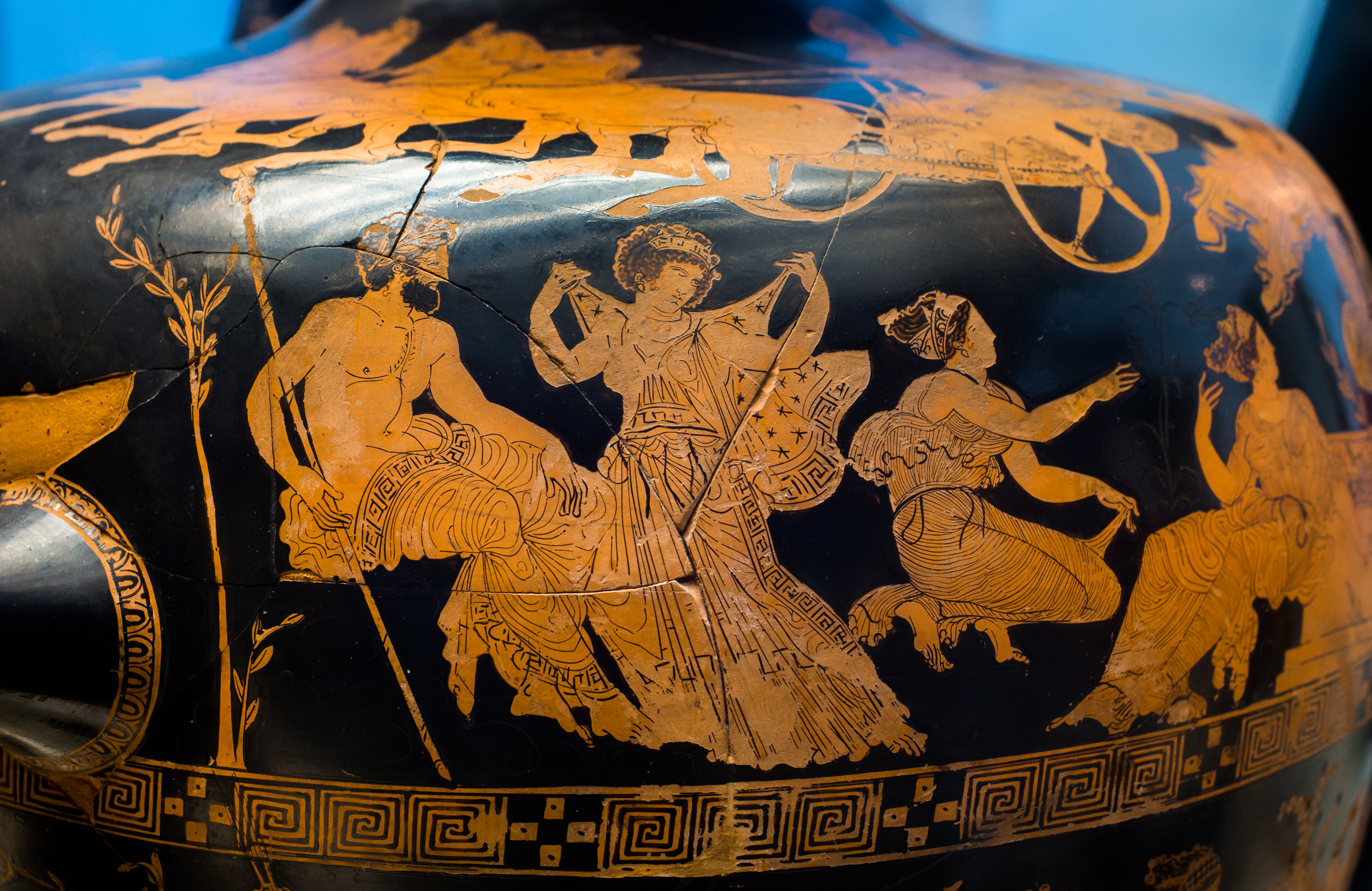
Detail of the vase

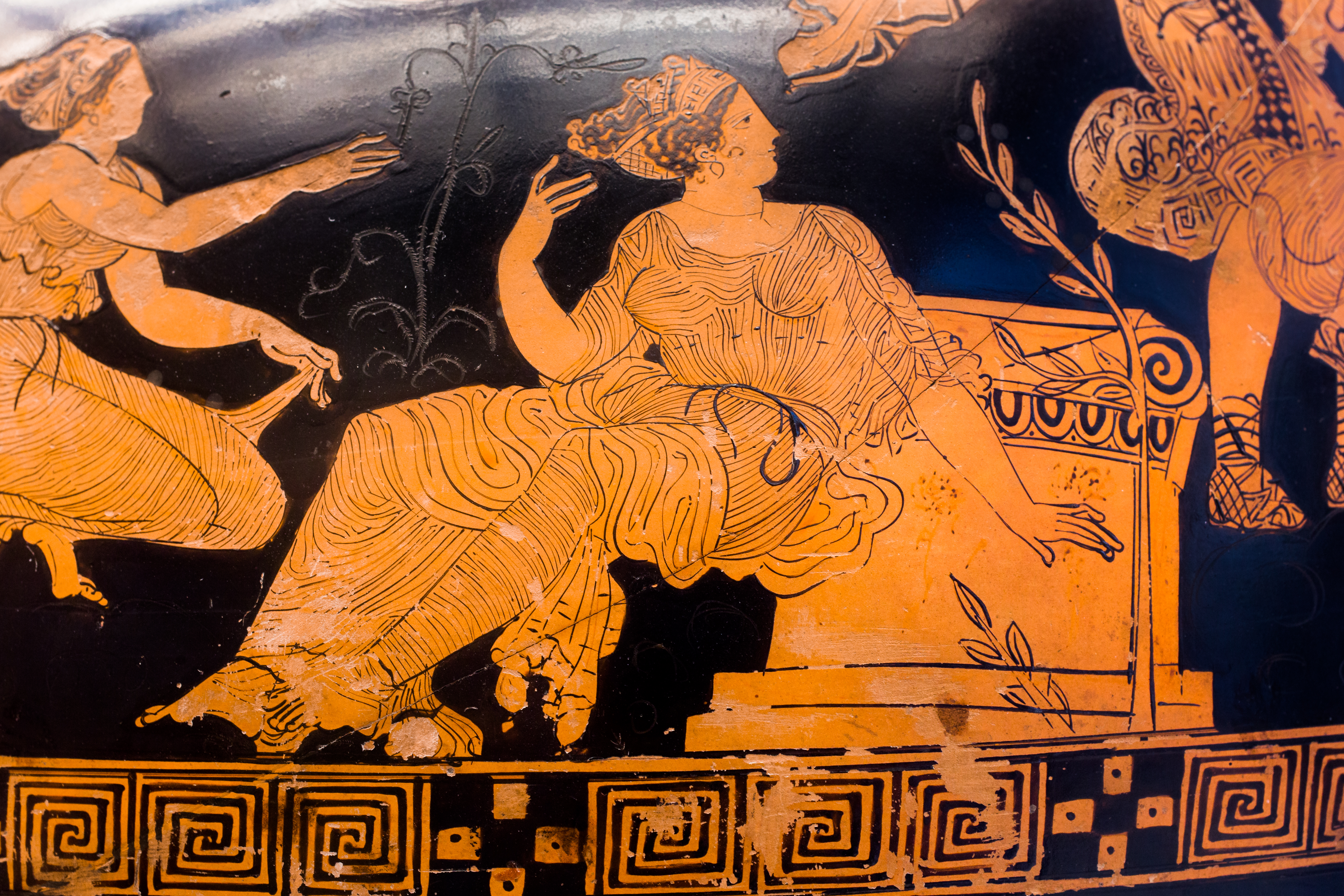
Detail of the vase

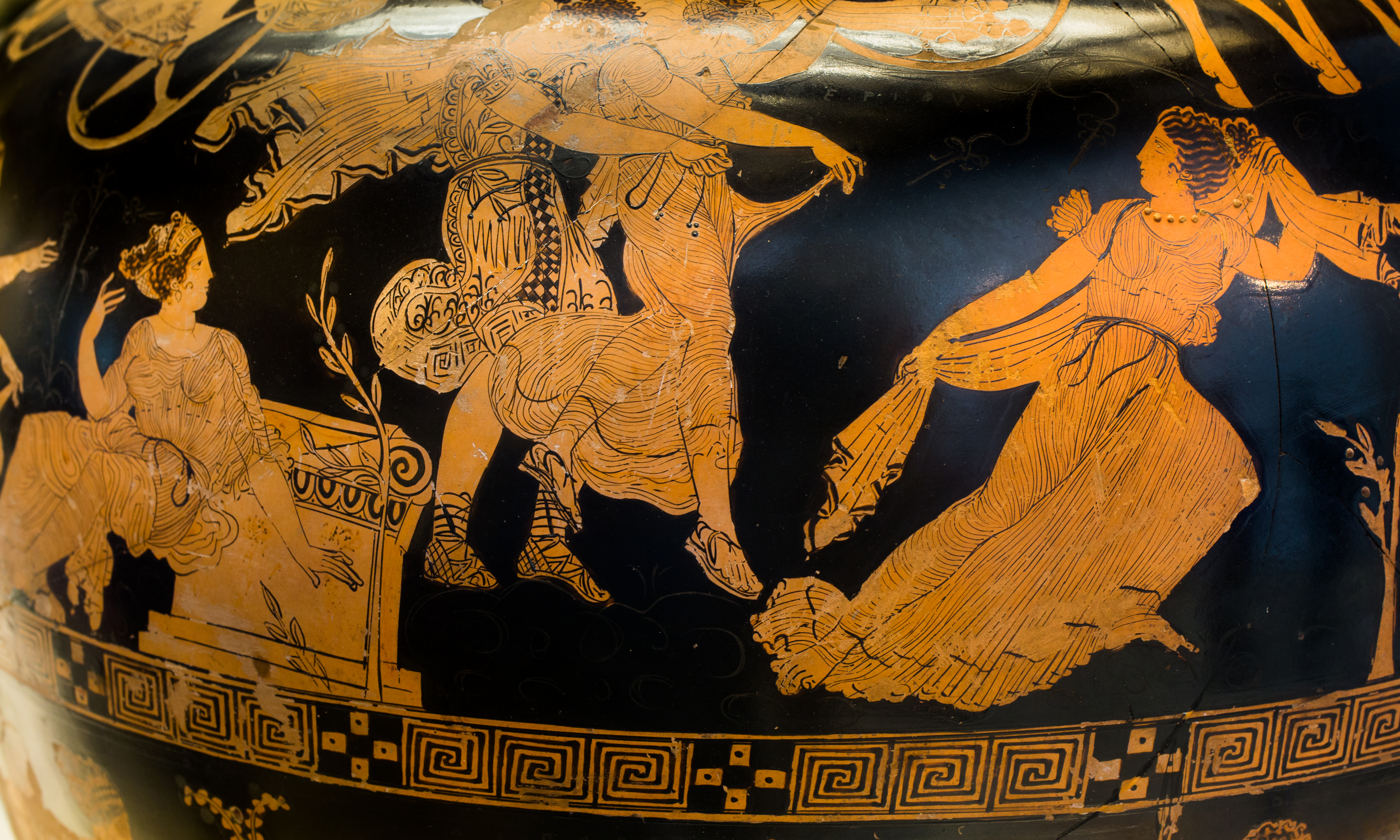
Detail of the vase

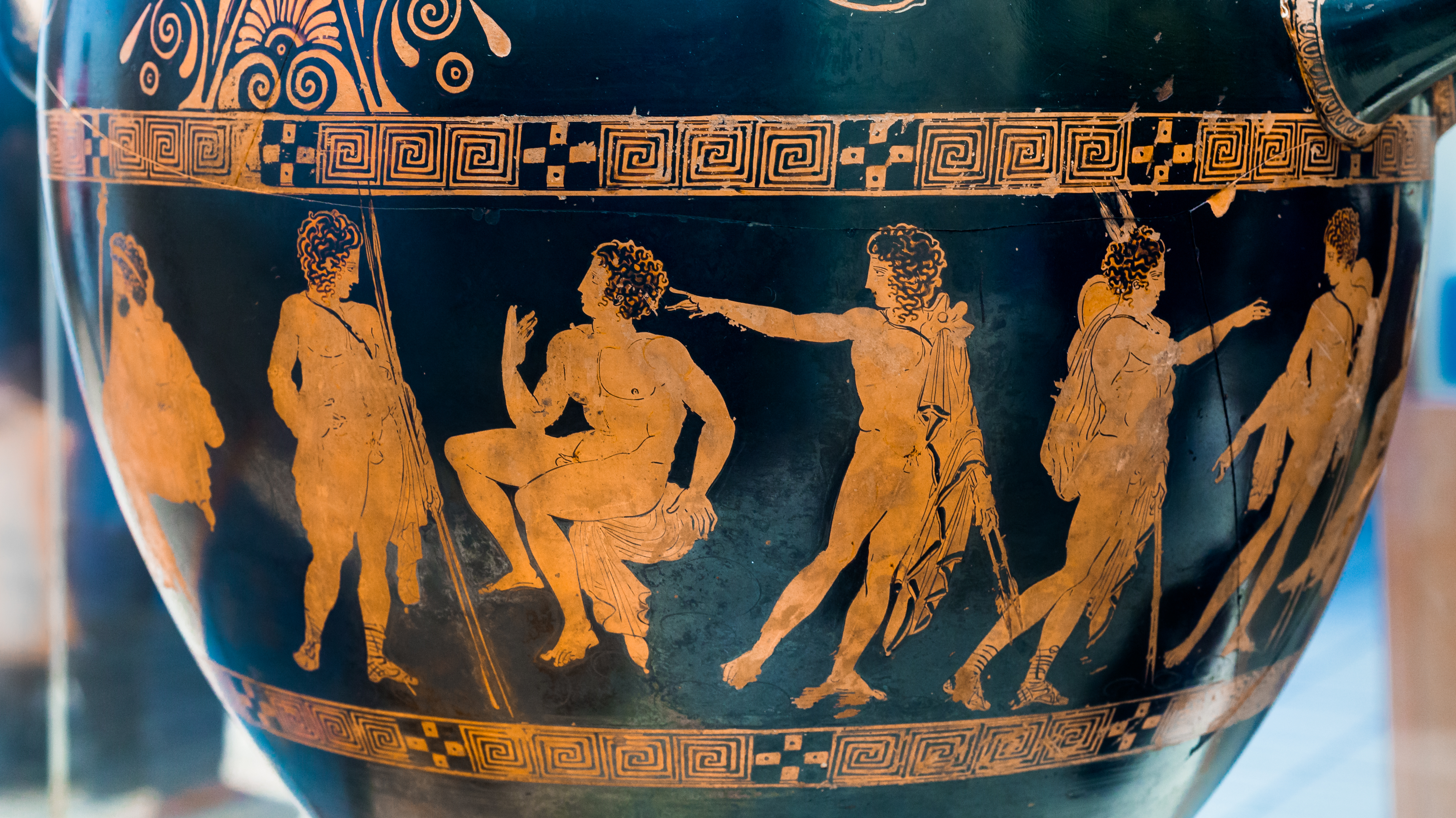
Detail of the vase

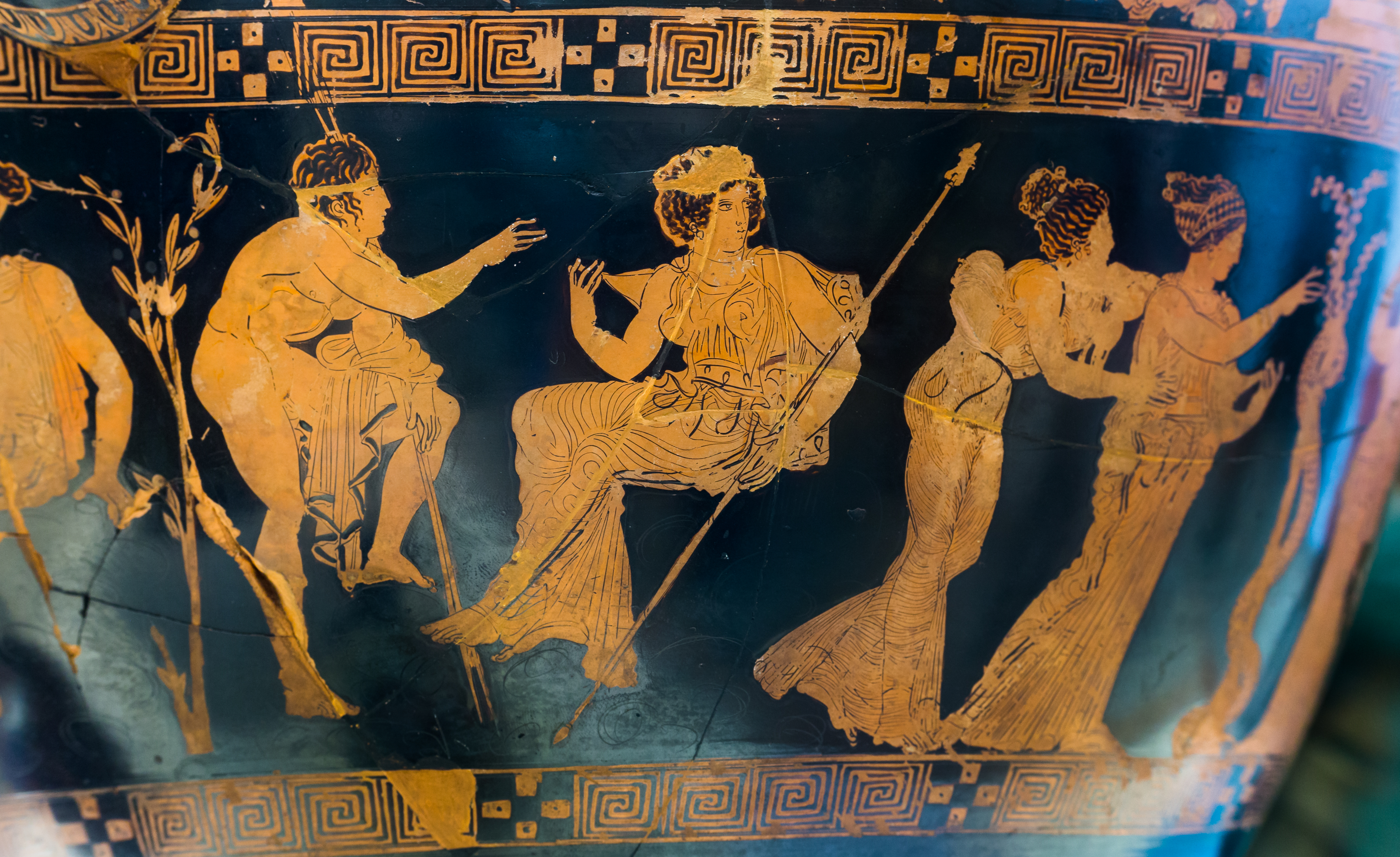
Detail of the vase

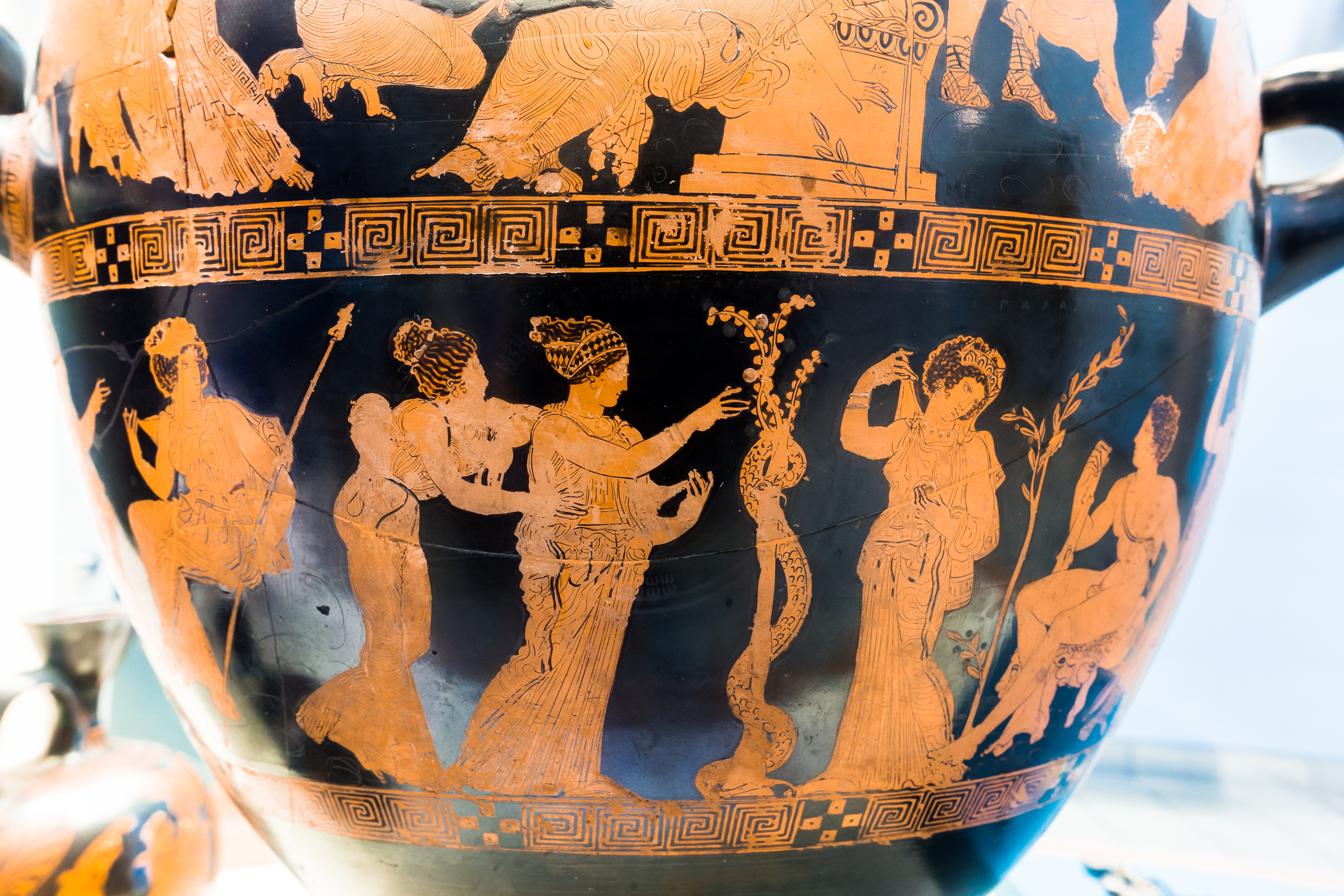
Detail of the vase

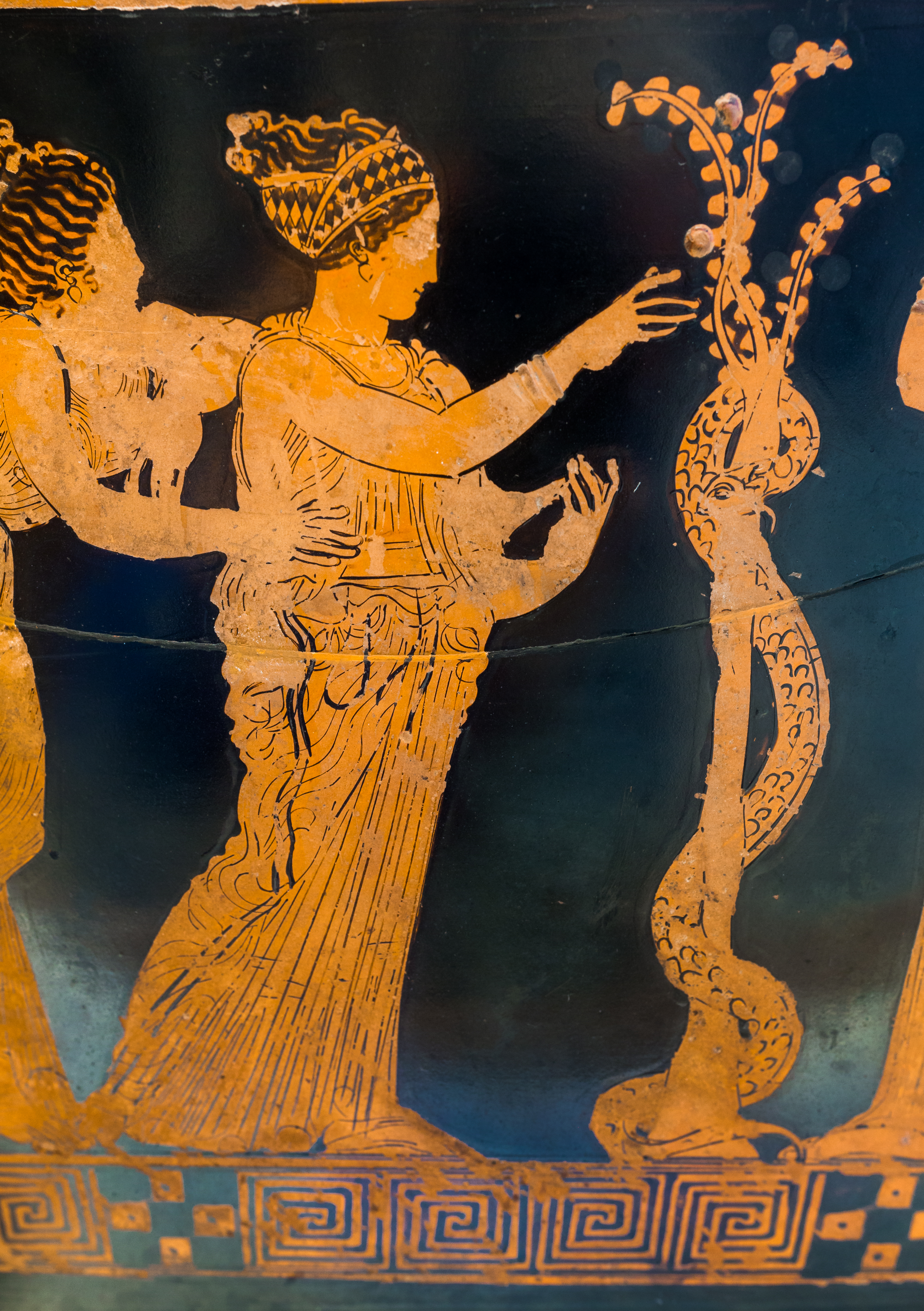
Detail of the vase

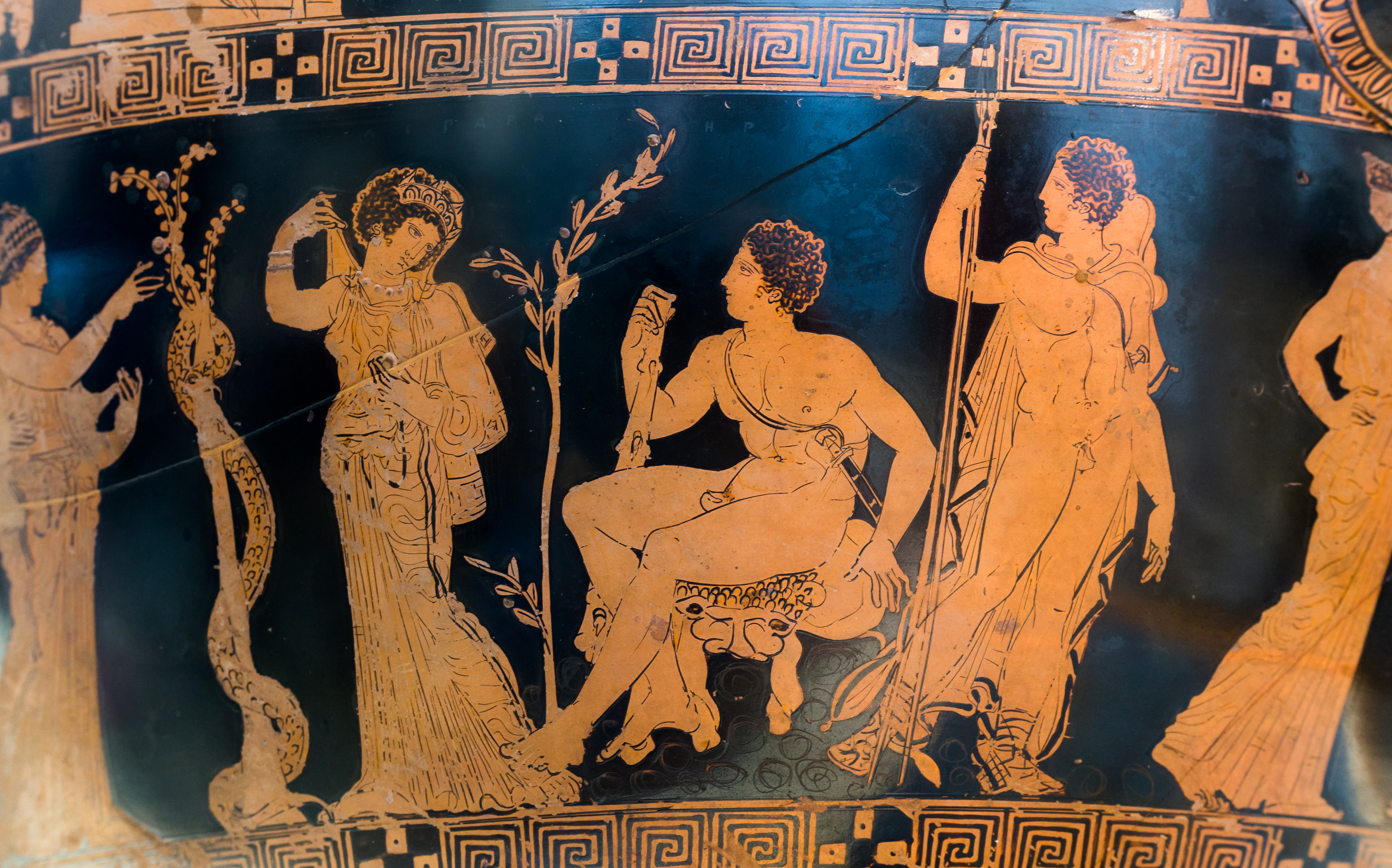
Detail of the vase

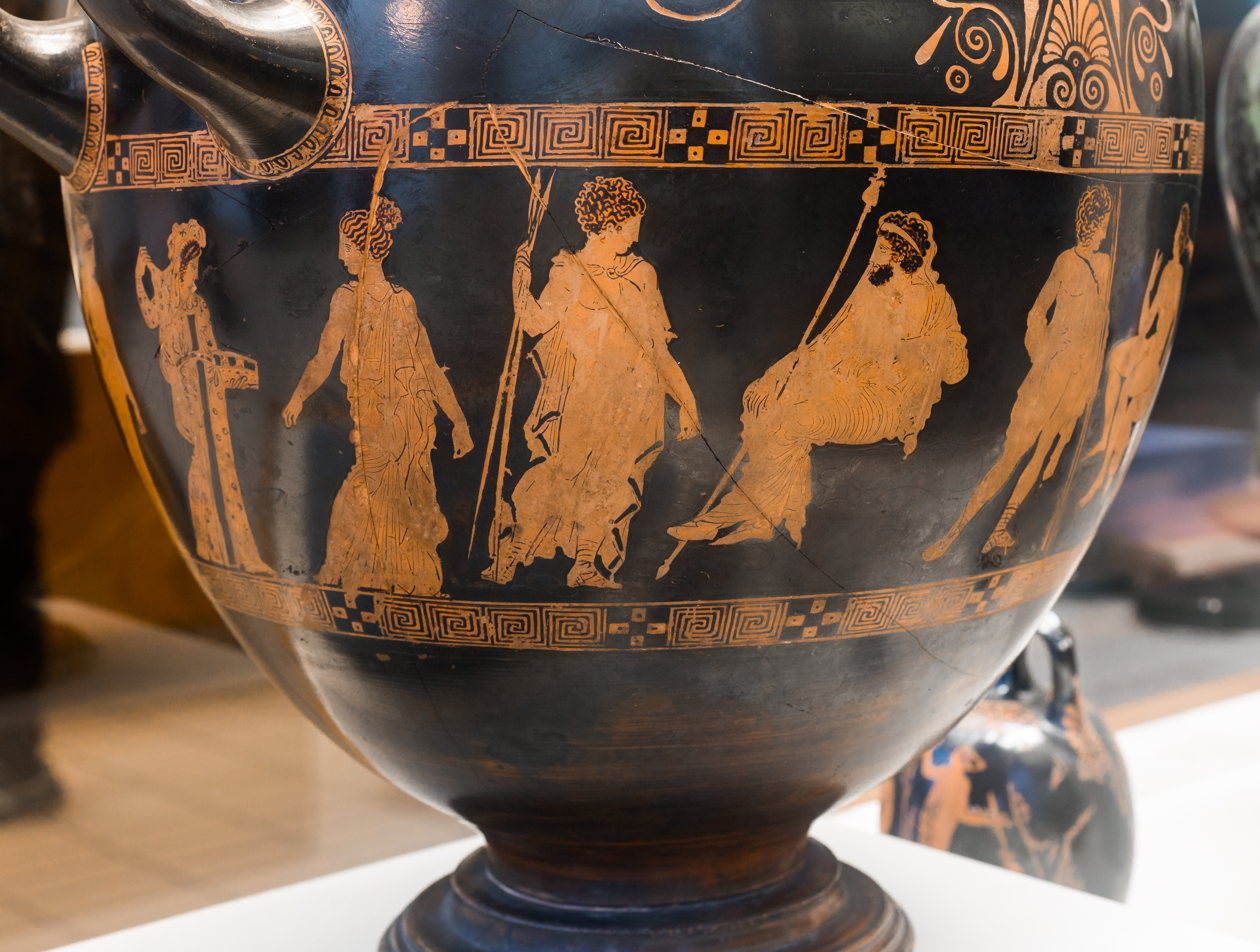
Detail of the vase
