= Hesperides =

Nymphs in Greek mythology

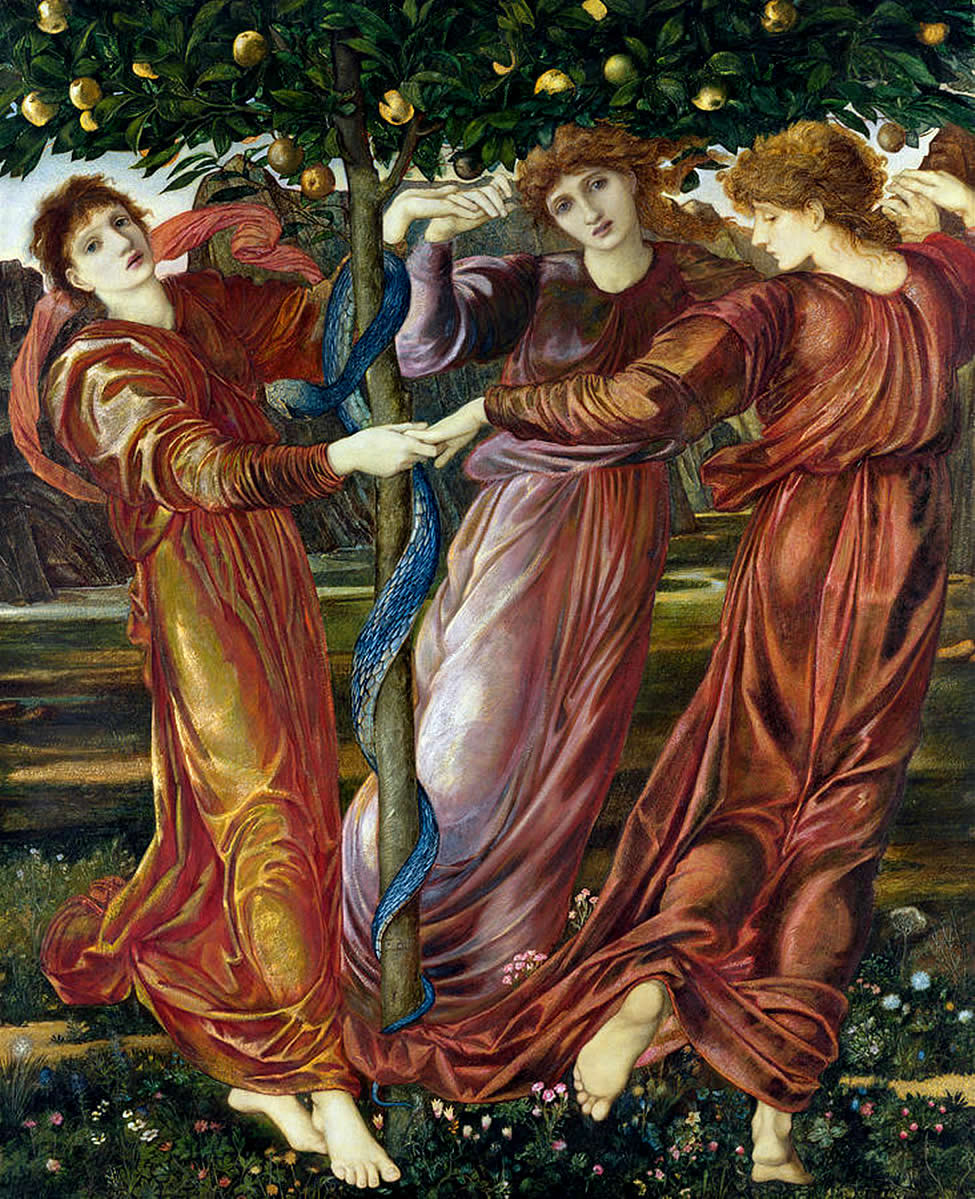
The Garden of the Hesperides by Edward Burne-Jones, 1870–73

In Greek mythology, the Hesperides (/hɛˈspɛrɪdiːz/; Ancient Greek: Ἑσπερίδες, Ancient Greek pronunciation: [hesperídes]) are the nymphs who tend the garden in which grow the trees of Hera which bear golden apples. They were also called the Atlantides (Ancient Greek: Ἀτλαντίδες, romanized: Atlantídes) from their reputed father, Atlas.

== Etymology ==
The name means originating from Hesperos (evening). Hesperos, or Vesper in Latin, is the origin of the name Hesperus, the evening star (i.e. the planet Venus) as well as having a shared root with the English word "west".

== Parentage and names ==
Both the parents, number, and names of the Hesperides vary between sources. They are sometimes portrayed as the evening daughters of Night (Nyx), either alone, or with Darkness (Erebus), in accord with the way Eos in the farthermost east, in Colchis, is the daughter of the titan Hyperion. The Hesperides are also listed as the daughters of Atlas and Hesperis, or of Phorcys and Ceto, or of Zeus and Themis. In his commentary on the Aeneid, Servius records a tradition in which the nymphs are said to be the daughters of Hesperus.

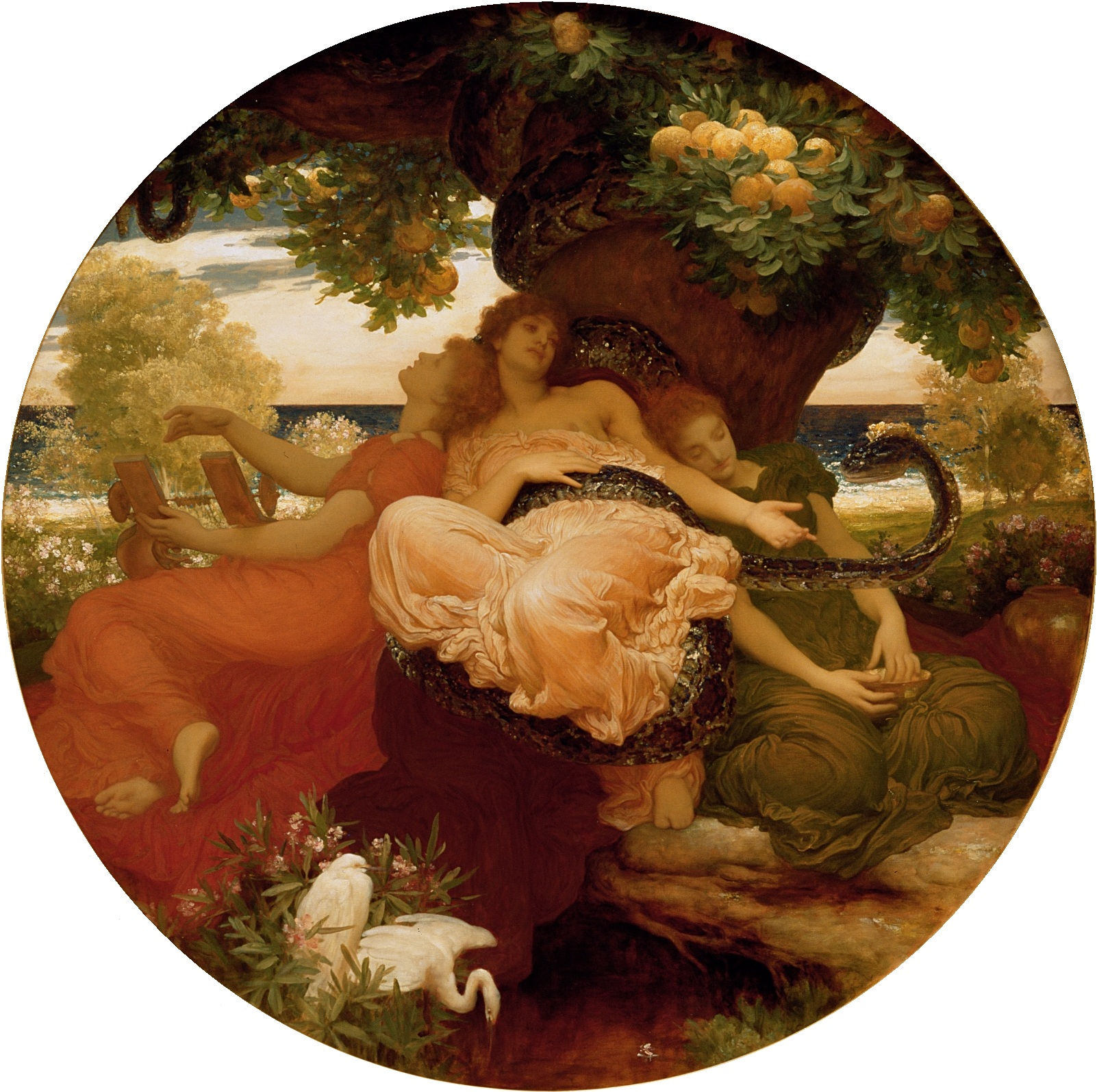
The Garden of the Hesperides by Frederick, Lord Leighton, 1892.

Apollonius of Rhodes gives the number as three with their names as Aigle, Erytheis, and Hespere (or Hespera). Hyginus in the Fabulae names two as Aegle and Hesperie. A third name, 'Aerica' is accepted by some, though Thomas Muncker views it as a certain corruption and suggests it be restored as 'Erythia'. The amendment is followed by Smith and Trzaskoma.

According to Servius, Hesiod named the Hesperides as Aigle, Erytheia, Hesperia, and Arethusa, though in some manuscripts it is instead recorded as 'Aegle and Erythea and ox-eyed Hesperethusa'. The attribution is considered doubtful. Apollodorus gives the number of the Hesperides also as four, namely: Aigle, Erytheia, Hesperia, and Arethusa, while Fulgentius named them as Aegle, Hesperie, Medusa, and Arethusa. The historiographer Diodorus in his account stated that they are seven in number with no information of their names.

The Meidias Hydria shows depicts Heracles in the garden of the Hesperides in one of the lower friezes. The names given above the figures of the Hesperides are: Asterope, Chrysothemis, Hygieia, and Lipara. On a lekythos by Asteas seven names are given: Aiopis, Antheia, Donakis, Calypso, Mermesa, Nelisa, and Tara. Ian McPhee argues that Donakis is probably a personification rather than one of the Hesperides. A red-figure pyxis c. 500–470 BCE attributed to a follower of Douris shows four figures in a garden presumed to be that of the Hesperides. Three names are provided above their heads: Hippolyte, Mapsaura, and Thetis. H. Heydemann describes these names as being picked out of a list of general mythic names according to the taste and inclination of the vase painter. A certain Crete, possible eponym of the island of Crete, was also called one of the Hesperides.

They are sometimes called the "Western Maidens", the "Daughters of Evening", or Erythrai, and the "Sunset Goddesses", designations all apparently tied to their imagined location in the distant west.

In addition to their tending of the garden, they have taken great pleasure in singing. Euripides calls them "minstrel maids" as they possess the power of sweet song.

Comparative table of Hesperides' parentage, number and names
| Variables | Item | Sources | | | | | | | | | | | | |
| Variables | Item | Hesiod | Pherecydes | Apollonius | | Cic. | Apollod. | Hyg. | Serv. | Fulg. | Apianus | Vase Paintings | | |
|---|---|---|---|---|---|---|---|---|---|---|---|---|---|---|
| Variables | Item | Theo. | Sch. Hipp. | Argo | Sch. | N.D. | Apollod. | Fab. | Aen. | Virg. cont. | Apianus | BM E772 | BM F284 | MANN 81847 |
| Parents | Nyx | Yes | | | | | | | | | | | | |
| Parents | Nyx and Erebus | | | | | Yes | | Yes | | | | | | |
| Parents | Zeus and Themis | | Yes | | | | | | | | | | | |
| Parents | Phorcys and Ceto | | | | Yes | | | | | | | | | |
| Parents | Atlas and Hesperis | | | | | | | | | | Yes | | | |
| Parents | Hesperus | | | | | | | | Yes | | | | | |
| Number | 3 | | | Yes | | | | Yes | | | | Yes | | |
| Number | 4 | Yes | | | | | Yes | | Yes | Yes | | | Yes | |
| Number | 7 | | | | | | | | | | Yes | | | Yes |
| Names | Aegle | Yes | | Yes | | | Yes | Yes | Yes | Yes | Yes | | | |
| Names | Erytheis / Erytheia | Yes | | Yes | | | Yes | | Yes | | Yes | | | |
| Names | Hesperia | Yes | | | | | Yes | | Yes | | Yes | | | |
| Names | Hespere / Hespera | | | Yes | | | | Yes | | Yes | Yes | | | |
| Names | Hesperusa | | | | | | | | | | Yes | | | |
| Names | Arethusa | Yes | | | | | Yes | | Yes | Yes | Yes | | | |
| Names | Hestia | | | | | | | | | | Yes | | | |
| Names | Medusa | | | | | | | | | Yes | | | | |
| Names | Aerica / Erythia | | | | | | | Yes | | | | | | |
| Names | Hippolyte | | | | | | | | | | | Yes | | |
| Names | Mapsaura | | | | | | | | | | | Yes | | |
| Names | Thetis | | | | | | | | | | | Yes | | |
| Names | Asterope | | | | | | | | | | | | Yes | |
| Names | Chrysothemis | | | | | | | | | | | | Yes | |
| Names | Hygieia | | | | | | | | | | | | Yes | |
| Names | Lipara | | | | | | | | | | | | Yes | |
| Names | Aiopis | | | | | | | | | | | | | Yes |
| Names | Antheia | | | | | | | | | | | | | Yes |
| Names | Donakis | | | | | | | | | | | | | Yes |
| Names | Calypso | | | | | | | | | | | | | Yes |
| Names | Mermesa | | | | | | | | | | | | | Yes |
| Names | Nelisa | | | | | | | | | | | | | Yes |
| Names | Tara | | | | | | | | | | | | | Yes |

=== Land of Hesperides ===
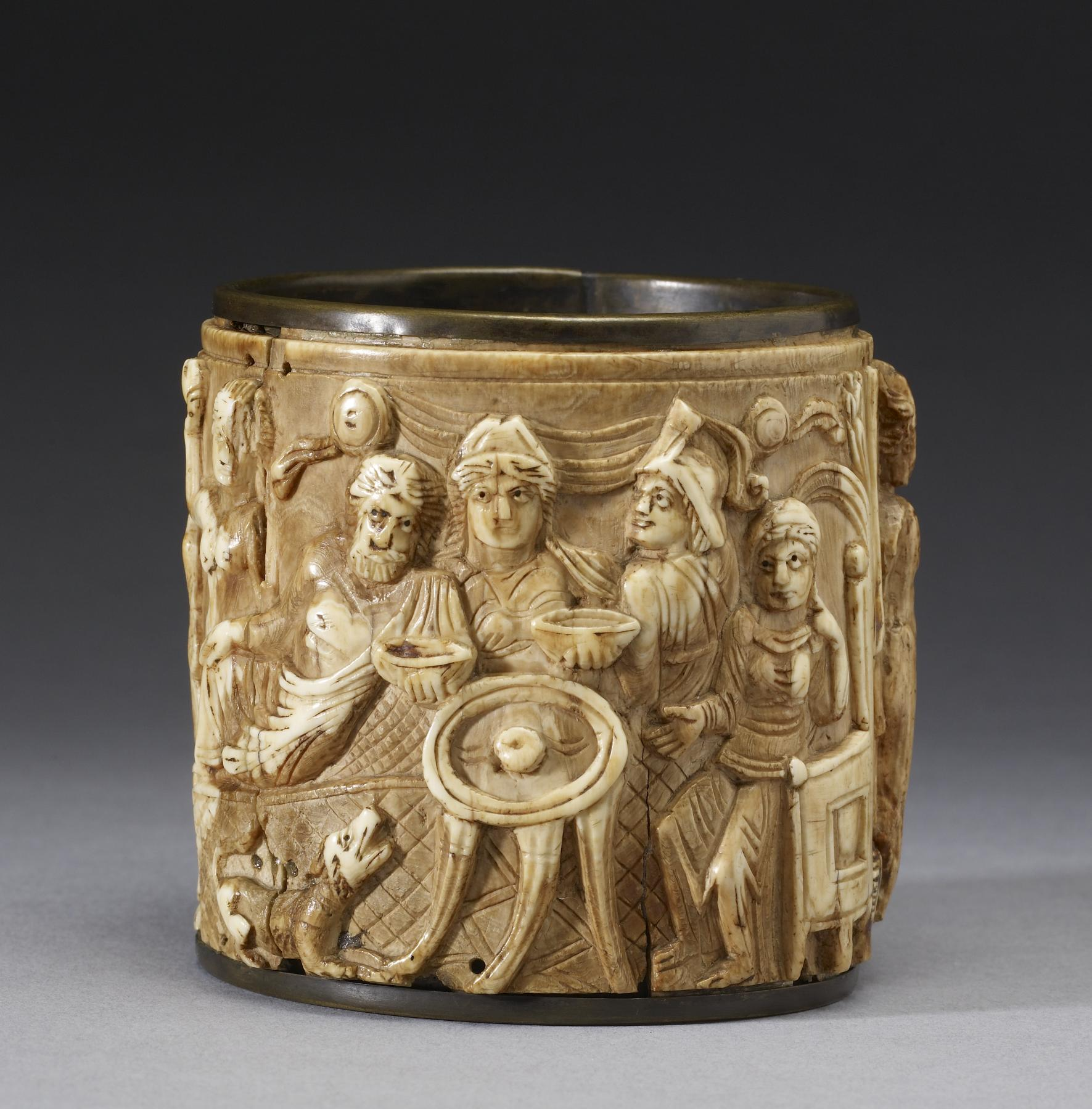
This circular Pyxis or box depicts two scenes. The one shown presents the Olympian gods feasting around a tripod table holding the golden Apple of the Hesperides. The Walters Art Museum.

The Hesperides tend a garden in a far western corner of the world, located near the Atlas Mountains in North Africa, at the edge of the world-encircling ocean of Oceanus.

The 1st-century AD Roman author Pliny the Elder, in the fifth book of his Natural History, places the garden in Lixus (in modern-day Morocco), which he describes as the location of the combat between Antaeus and Hercules; later, in the sixth book of the work, he states that the Hesperides live on two islands in the Atlantic.

Euesperides (in modern-day Benghazi) which was probably founded by people from Cyrene or Barca, from both of which it lies to the west, might have mythological associations with the garden of Hesperides.

In his epic poem, the Punica, Roman poet Silius Italicus describes the Massylii as coming from the "Woods of the Hesperides" located at the edge of the inhabited world. However, modern historians note that this account reflects a geographical and ethnographical confusion by the poet. Silius Italicus conflated the Massylii with the neighboring Masaesyli, placed them under the rule of the moorish king Bocchus, and shifted their origin further west to northern Tingitana (in modern-day Morocco), where the Hesperides were traditionally localized in Roman poetic convention. By Ancient Roman times, the garden of the Hesperides had lost its archaic place in religion and had dwindled to a poetic convention, in which form it was revived in Renaissance poetry, to refer both to the garden and to the nymphs that dwelt there.

=== The Garden of the Hesperides ===
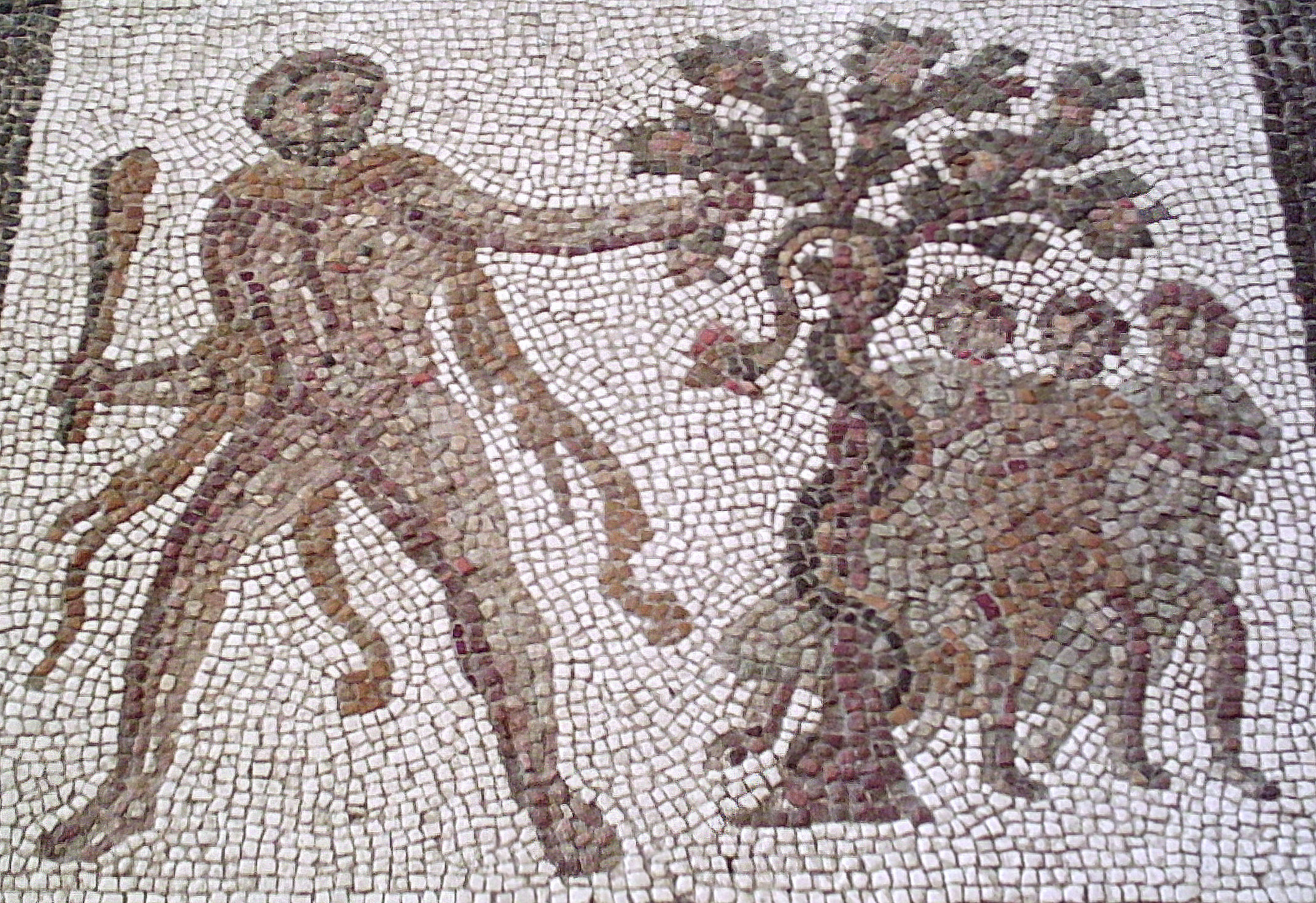
Detail of a third century AD Roman mosaic of the Labours of Hercules from Llíria, Spain showing Heracles stealing the golden apples from the Garden of the Hesperides

The Garden of the Hesperides is Hera's orchard in the west, where either a single apple tree or a grove grows, producing golden apples. According to the legend, when the marriage of Zeus and Hera took place, the different deities came with nuptial presents for the latter, and among them the goddess Gaia, with branches having golden apples growing on them as a wedding gift. Hera, greatly admiring these, begged of Gaia to plant them in her gardens, which extended as far as Mount Atlas.

The Hesperides were given the task of tending to the grove, and Hera set an immortal, never-sleeping, hundred-headed dragon named Ladon to guard the apples. In the myth of the Judgement of Paris, it was from the Garden that Eris, Goddess of Discord, obtained the Apple of Discord, which led to the Trojan War.

In later years it was thought that the "golden apples" might have actually been oranges, a fruit unknown to Europe and the Mediterranean before the Middle Ages. Under this assumption, the Greek botanical name chosen for all citrus species was Hesperidoeidē (Ἑσπεριδοειδῆ, "hesperidoids") and even today the Greek word for the orange fruit is πορτοκάλι (Portokáli)--after the country of Portugal in Iberia near where the Garden of the Hesperides grew.

=== The Eleventh Labour of Heracles ===
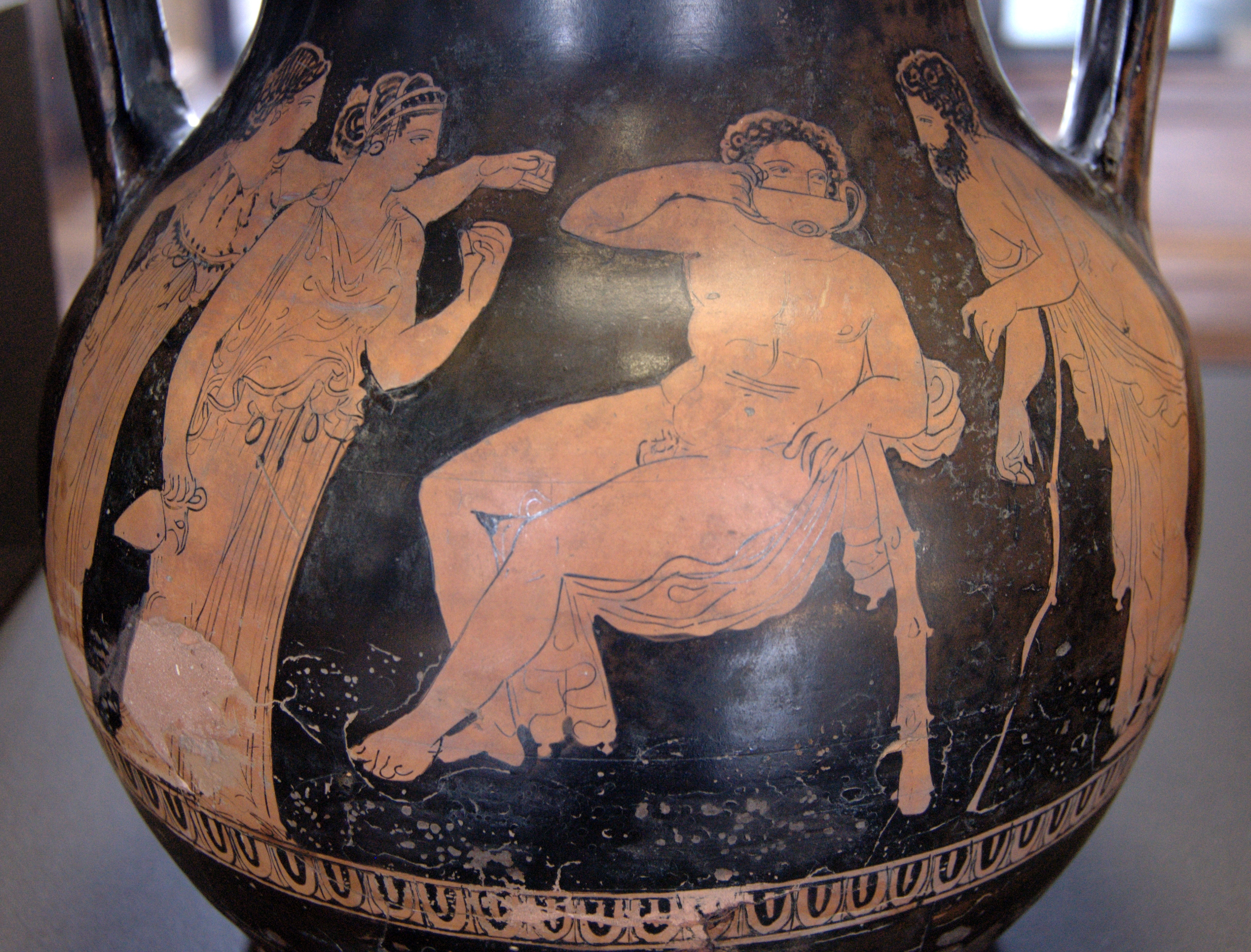
Heracles in the Hesperides garden. Side A from an Attic red-figure pelike, 380–370 BC. From Cyrenaica.

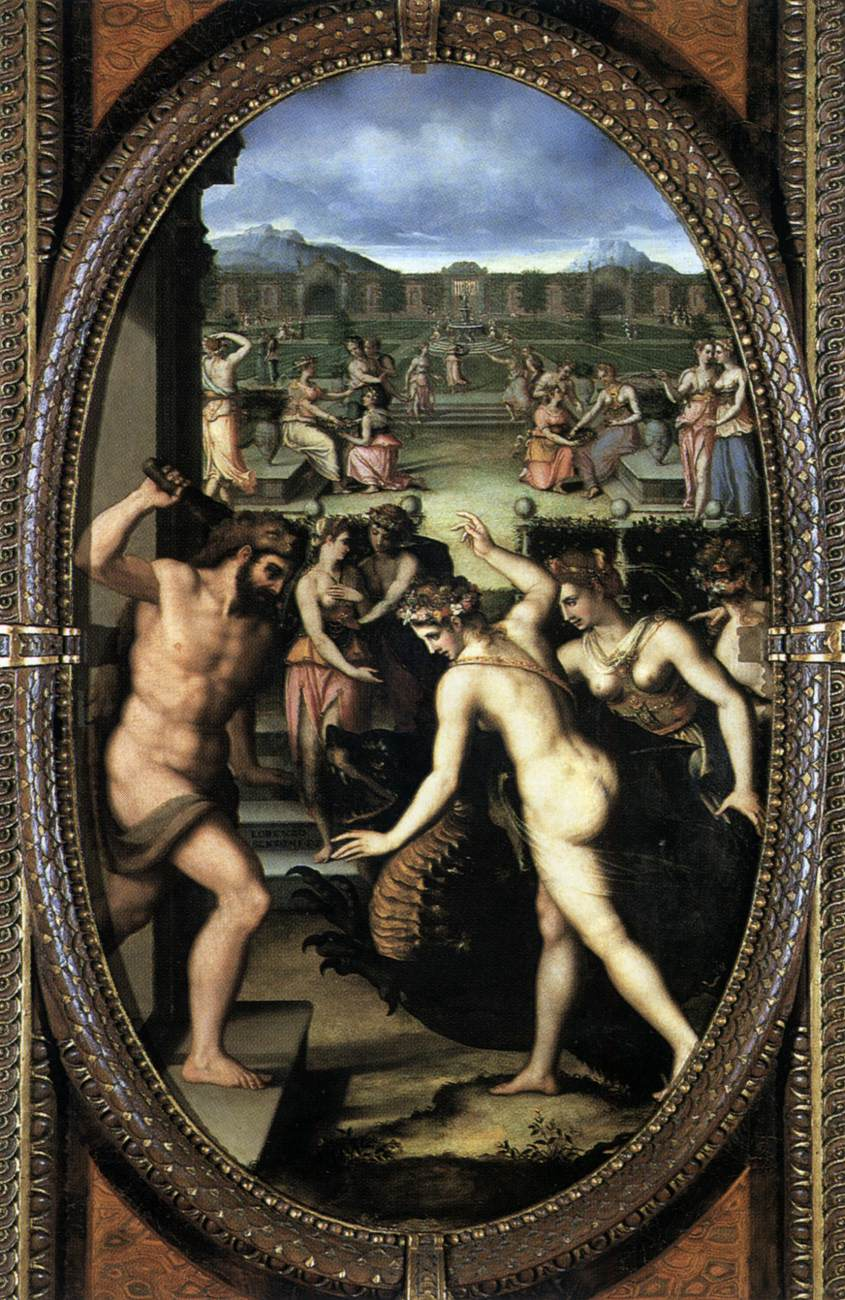
Hercules Killing the Dragon in the Garden of the Hesperides by Lorenzo Vaiani

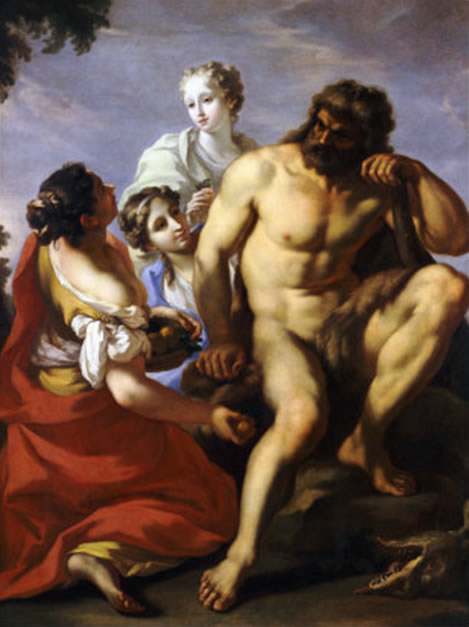
Hercules in the Garden of the Hesperides by Giovanni Antonio Pellegrini

After Heracles completed his first ten Labours, Eurystheus gave him two more claiming that neither the Hydra counted (because Iolaus helped Heracles) nor the Augean stables (either because he received payment for the job or because the rivers did the work). The first of these two additional Labours was to steal the apples from the garden of the Hesperides. Heracles first caught the Old Man of the Sea, the shape-shifting sea god, to learn where the Garden of the Hesperides was located. In some versions of the tale, Heracles went to the Caucasus, where Prometheus was confined. The Titan directed him concerning his course through the land of the peoples in the farthest north and the perils to be encountered on his homeward march after slaying Geryon in the farthest west.

Follow this straight road; and, first of all, thou shalt come to the Boreades, where do thou beware the roaring hurricane, lest unawares it twist thee up and snatch thee away in wintry whirlwind.

As payment, Heracles freed Prometheus from his daily torture. This tale is more usually found in the position of the Erymanthian Boar, since it is associated with Chiron choosing to forgo immortality and taking Prometheus' place.

Another story recounts how Heracles, either at the start or at the end of his task, meets Antaeus, who was immortal as long as he touched his mother, Gaia, the earth. Heracles killed Antaeus by holding him aloft and crushing him in a bearhug. Herodotus claims that Heracles stopped in Egypt, where King Busiris decided to make him the yearly sacrifice, but Heracles burst out of his chains.

Finally making his way to the Garden of the Hesperides, Heracles tricked Atlas into retrieving some of the golden apples for him, by offering to hold up the heavens for a little while (Atlas was able to take them as, in this version, he was the father or otherwise related to the Hesperides). This would have made this task – like the Hydra and Augean stables – void because he had received help. Upon his return, Atlas decided that he did not want to take the heavens back, and instead offered to deliver the apples himself, but Heracles tricked him again by agreeing to take his place on condition that Atlas relieve him temporarily so that Heracles could make his cloak more comfortable. Atlas agreed, but Heracles reneged and walked away, carrying the apples. According to an alternative version, Heracles slew Ladon instead and stole the apples. Apollodorus states that, having been presented with the apples by Heracles, Eurytheus bestowed them upon Heracles, and that Athena then returned the apples to the garden.

They are considered by some to be the same "apples of joy" that tempted Atalanta, as opposed to the "apple of discord" used by Eris to start a beauty contest on Olympus (which caused "The Siege of Troy").

On Attic pottery, especially from the late fifth century, Heracles is depicted sitting in bliss in the Gardens of the Hesperides, attended by the maidens.

=== Argonauts' encounter ===
After the hero Heracles killed Ladon and stole the golden apples, the Argonauts during their journey, came to the Hesperian plain the next day. The band of heroes asked for the mercy of the Hesperides to guide them to a source of water in order to slake their thirst. The goddesses pitying the young men, directed them to a spring created by Heracles who likewise longing for a draught while wandering the land, smote a rock near Lake Triton after which the water gushed out. The following passage recounts this meeting of the Argonauts and the nymphs:

Then, like raging hounds, they [i.e. Argonauts] rushed to search for a spring; for besides their suffering and anguish, a parching thirst lay upon them, and not in vain did they wander; but they came to the sacred plain where Ladon, the serpent of the land, till yesterday kept watch over the golden apples in the garden of Atlas; and all around the nymphs, the Hesperides, were busied, chanting their lovely song. But at that time, stricken by Heracles, he lay fallen by the trunk of the apple-tree; only the tip of his tail was still writhing; but from his head down his dark spine he lay lifeless; and where the arrows had left in his blood the bitter gall of the Lernaean hydra, flies withered and died over the festering wounds. And close at hand the Hesperides, their white arms flung over their golden heads, lamented shrilly; and the heroes drew near suddenly; but the maidens, at their quick approach, at once became dust and earth where they stood. Orpheus marked the divine portent, and for his comrades addressed them in prayer: "O divine ones, fair and kind, be gracious, O queens, whether ye be numbered among the heavenly goddesses, or those beneath the earth, or be called the Solitary nymphs; come, O nymphs, sacred race of Oceanus, appear manifest to our longing eyes and show us some spring of water from the rock or some sacred flow gushing from the earth, goddesses, wherewith we may quench the thirst that burns us unceasingly. And if ever again we return in our voyaging to the Achaean land, then to you among the first of goddesses with willing hearts will we bring countless gifts, libations and banquets.

So he spake, beseeching them with plaintive voice; and they from their station near pitied their pain; and lo! First of all they caused grass to spring from the earth; and above the grass rose up tall shoots, and then flourishing saplings grew standing upright far above the earth. Hespere became a poplar and Eretheis an elm, and Aegle a willow's sacred trunk. And forth from these trees their forms looked out, as clear as they were before, a marvel exceeding great, and Aegle spake with gentle words answering their longing looks: "Surely there has come hither a mighty succour to your toils, that most accursed man, who robbed our guardian serpent of life and plucked the golden apples of the goddesses and is gone; and has left bitter grief for us. For yesterday came a man most fell in wanton violence, most grim in form; and his eyes flashed beneath his scowling brow; a ruthless wretch; and he was clad in the skin of a monstrous lion of raw hide, untanned; and he bare a sturdy bow of olive, and a bow, wherewith he shot and killed this monster here. So he too came, as one traversing the land on foot, parched with thirst; and he rushed wildly through this spot, searching for water, but nowhere was he like to see it. Now here stood a rock near the Tritonian lake; and of his own device, or by the prompting of some god, he smote it below with his foot; and the water gushed out in full flow. And he, leaning both his hands and chest upon the ground, drank a huge draught from the rifted rock, until, stooping like a beast of the field, he had satisfied his mighty maw.

Thus she spake; and they gladly with joyful steps ran to the spot where Aegle had pointed out to them the spring, until they reached it. And as when earth-burrowing ants gather in swarms round a narrow cleft, or when flies lighting upon a tiny drop of sweet honey cluster round with insatiate eagerness; so at that time, huddled together, the Minyae thronged about the spring from the rock. And thus with wet lips one cried to another in his delight: "Strange! In very truth Heracles, though far away, has saved his comrades, fordone with thirst. Would that we might find him on his way as we pass through the mainland!

=== Variation of the myth ===
According to Diodorus' account, the Hesperides did not have the golden apples. Instead they possessed flocks of sheep which excelled in beauty and were therefore called for their beauty, as the poets might do, "golden apples", just as Aphroditê is called "golden" because of her loveliness. Others also say that it was because the sheep had a peculiar colour like gold that they got this designation. This version further states that Dracon ("dragon") was the name of the shepherd of the sheep, a man who excelled in strength of body and courage, who guarded the sheep and slew any who might dare to carry them off.

== In the Renaissance ==
With the revival of classical allusions in the Renaissance, the Hesperides returned to their prominent position, and the garden itself took on the name of its nymphs: Robert Greene wrote of "The fearful Dragon... that watched the garden called Hesperides". Shakespeare inserted the comically insistent rhyme "is not Love a Hercules, Still climbing trees in the Hesperides" in Love's Labours Lost (iv.iii) and John Milton mentioned the "ladies of the Hesperides" in Paradise Regained (ii.357). Hesperides (published 1647) was the title of a collection of pastoral and religious verse by the Royalist poet Robert Herrick.

== Gallery ==
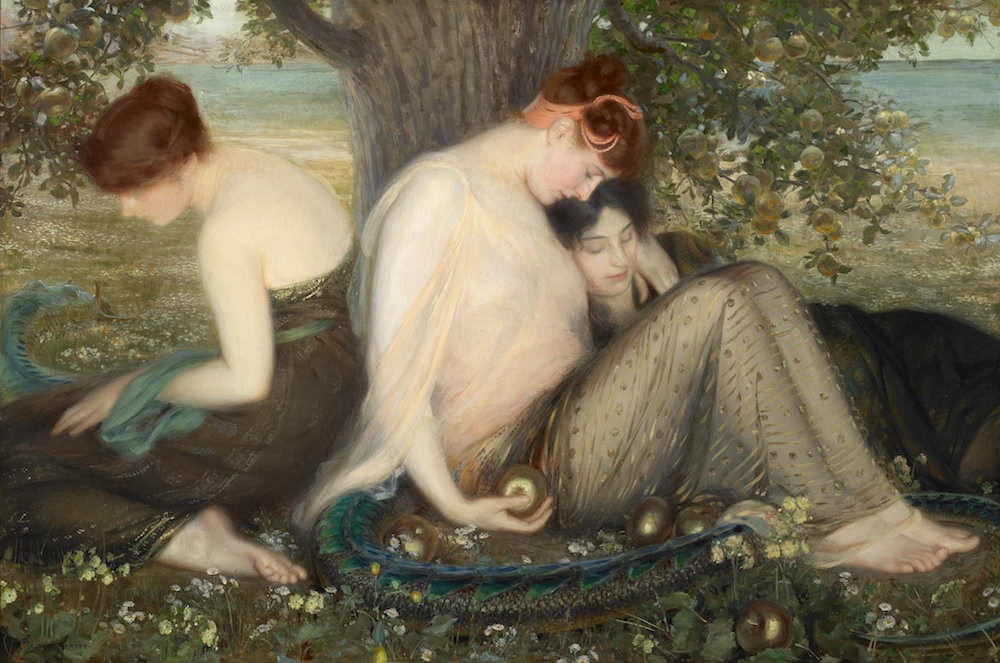
Garden of Hesperides by Albert Herter

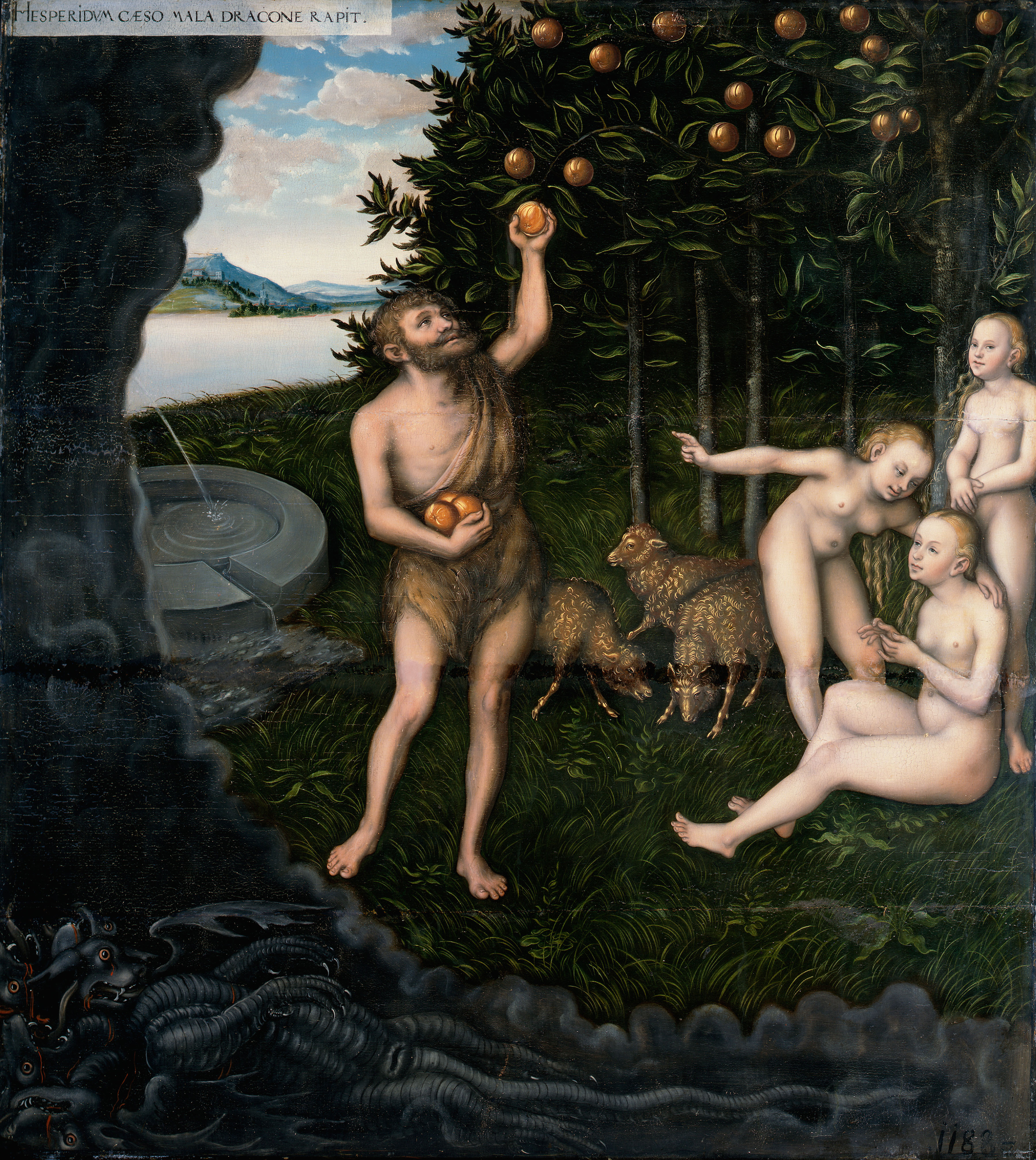
Hercules steals the Apples of the Hesperides by Lucas Cranach the Elder

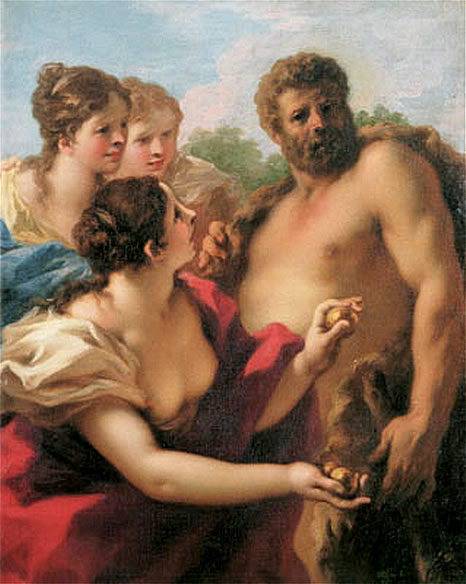
Hercules and the Hesperides by Giovanni Antonio Pellegrini

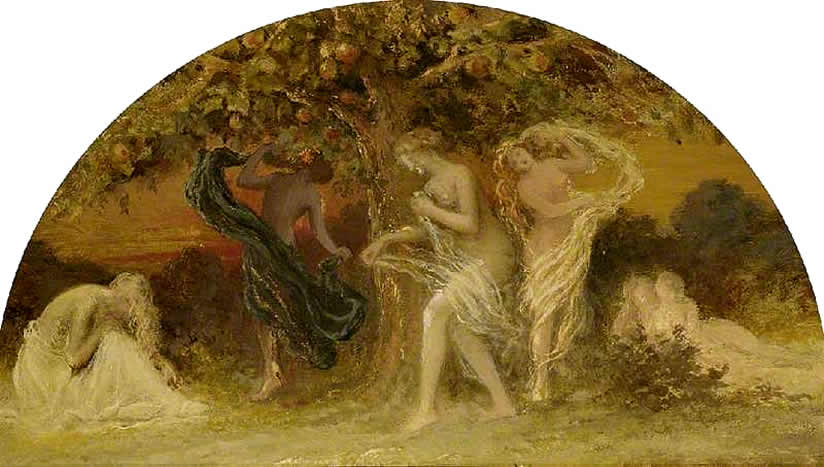
Hesperides, Dance around the Golden Tree by Edward Calvert

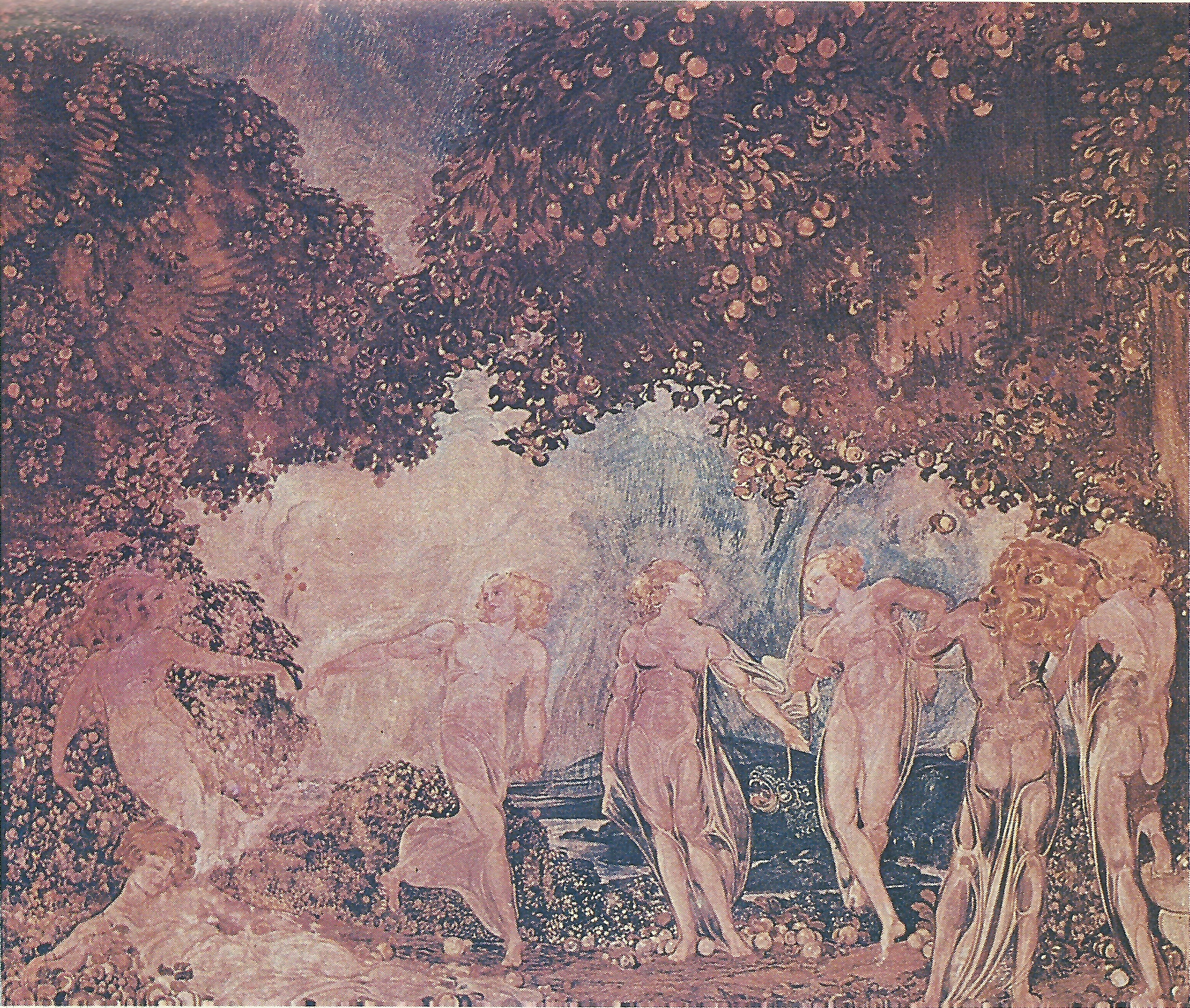
Huerto de las Hespérides, 1909 by Néstor Martín-Fernández de la Torre

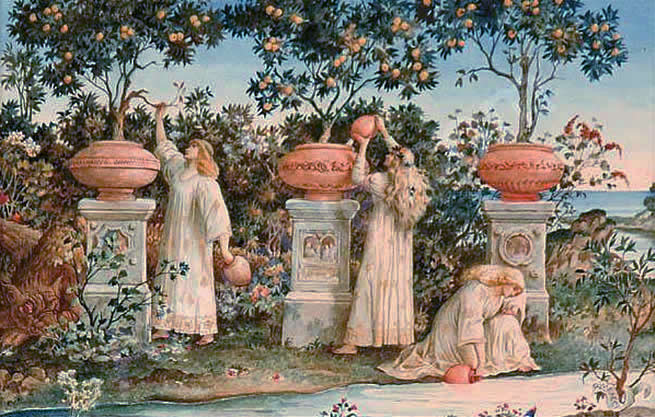
The Garden of Hesperides by Ricciardo Meacci, 1894

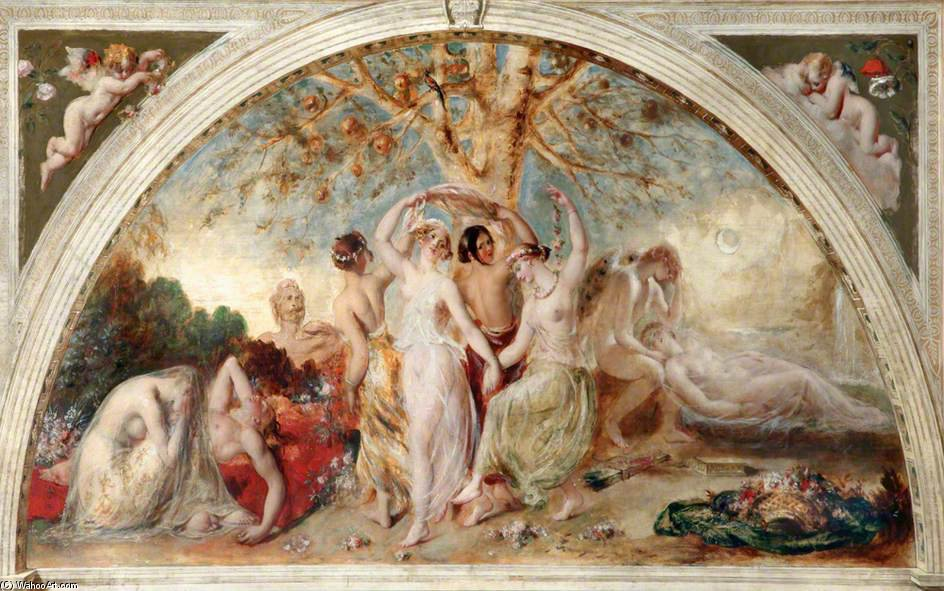
Hesperus by William Etty

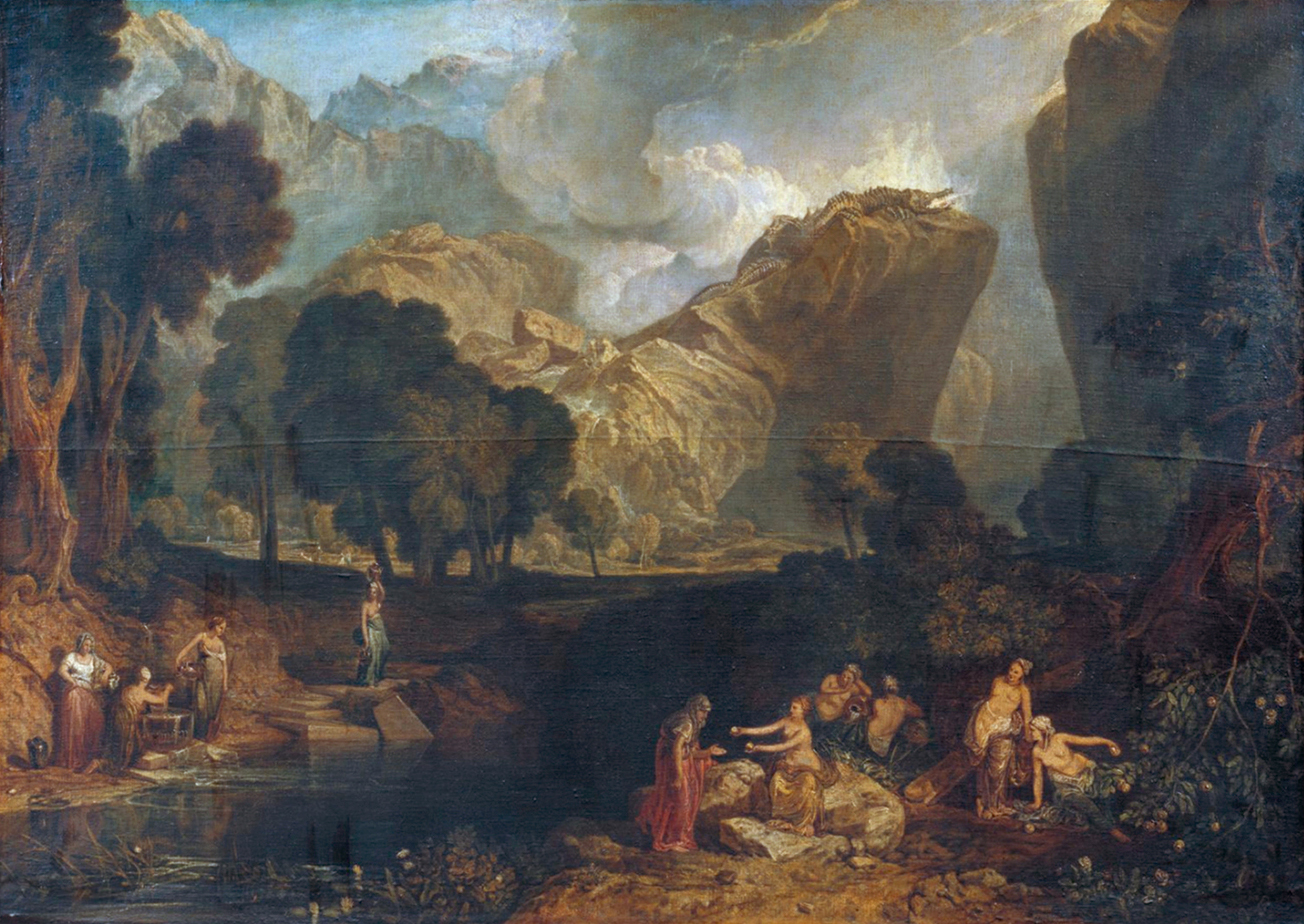
The Goddess of Discord Choosing the Apple of Contention in the Garden of the Hesperides - c. 1806 by J. M. W. Turner

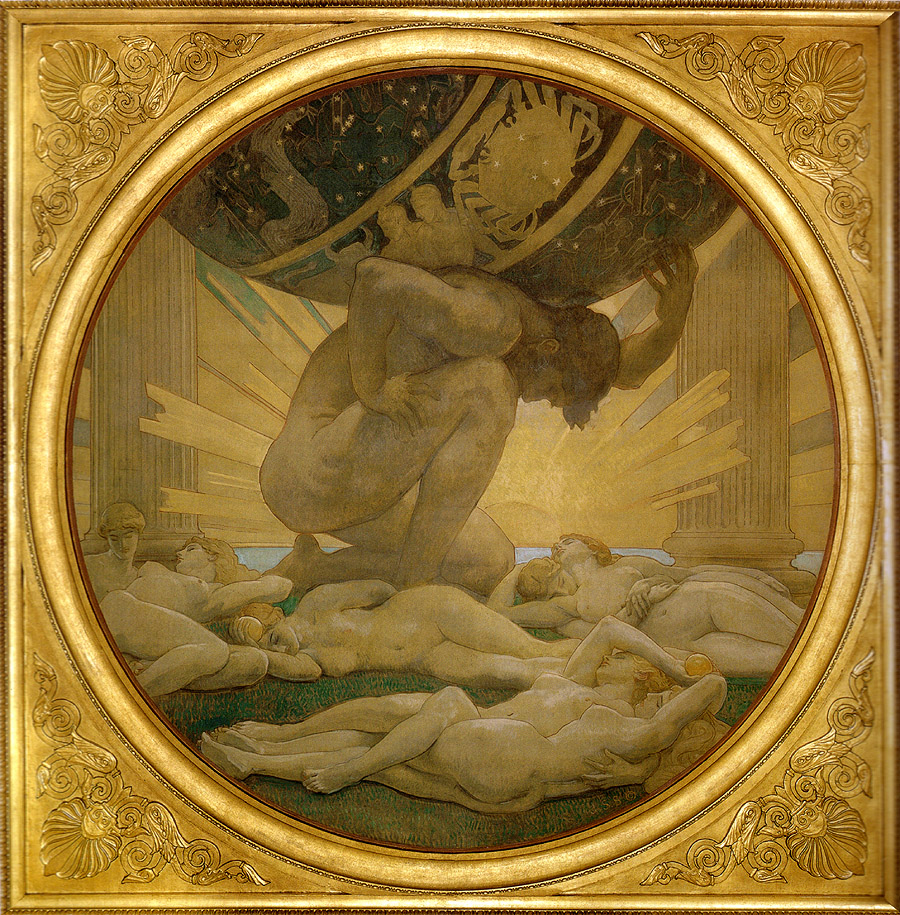
Atlas and the Hesperides by John Singer Sargent

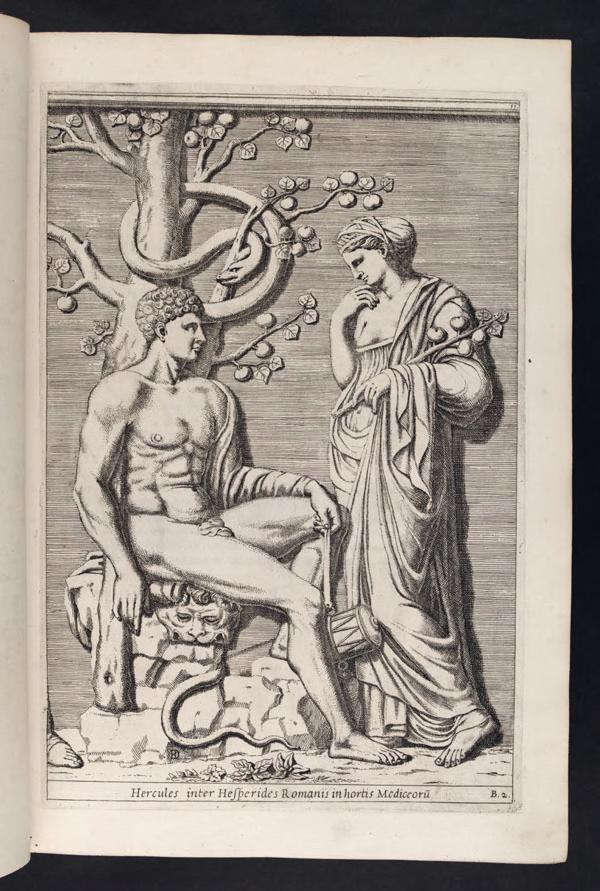
Hesperides and Heracles from the book 'De malorvm avreorvm cvltvra et vsv libri quatuor' by Giovanni Baptista Ferrari

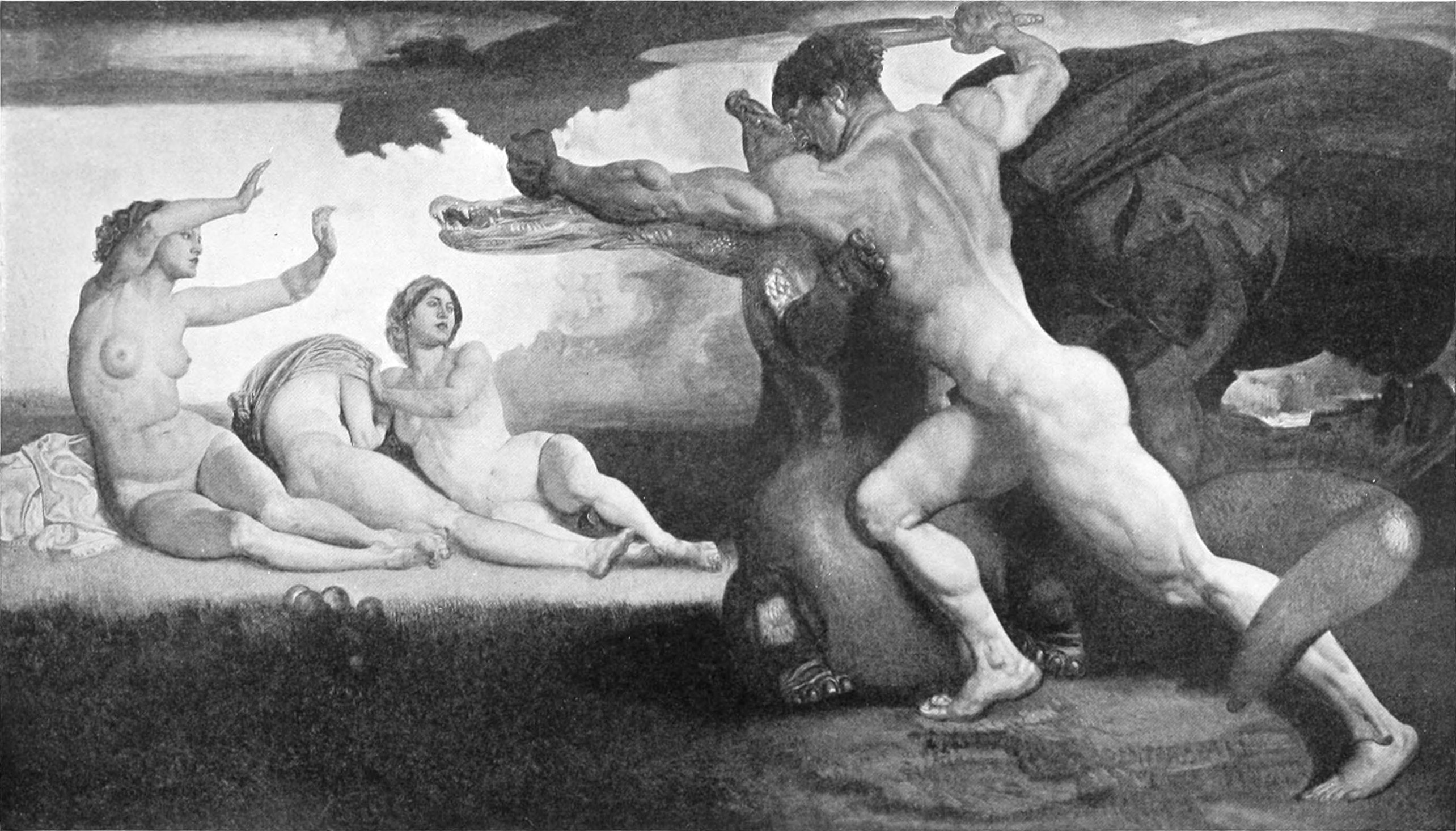
Hercule et les Hesperides by Rudolf Jettmar

== Namesakes ==
- Asterope is a genus of butterflies of the family Nymphalidae.

== See also ==
- Avalon
- Cedar Forest
- Fortunate Isles
- Garden of Eden
- Golden apple
- Immortality
- Hesperium
- Paradise

== General references ==
- Ambühl, Annemarie, "Hesperides", in Brill's New Pauly: Encyclopaedia of the Ancient World. Antiquity, Volume 6, Hat – Jus, edited by Hubert Cancik and Helmuth Schneider, Brill, 2005. ISBN 9004122699.
- Grimal, Pierre, The Dictionary of Classical Mythology, Wiley-Blackwell, 1996, ISBN 978-0-631-20102-1. "Hesperides" p. 213
- Smith, William (1873). "Hespe'rides". Dictionary of Greek and Roman Biography and Mythology, London.
