= Erytheia (nymph) =

Figure in Greek mythology

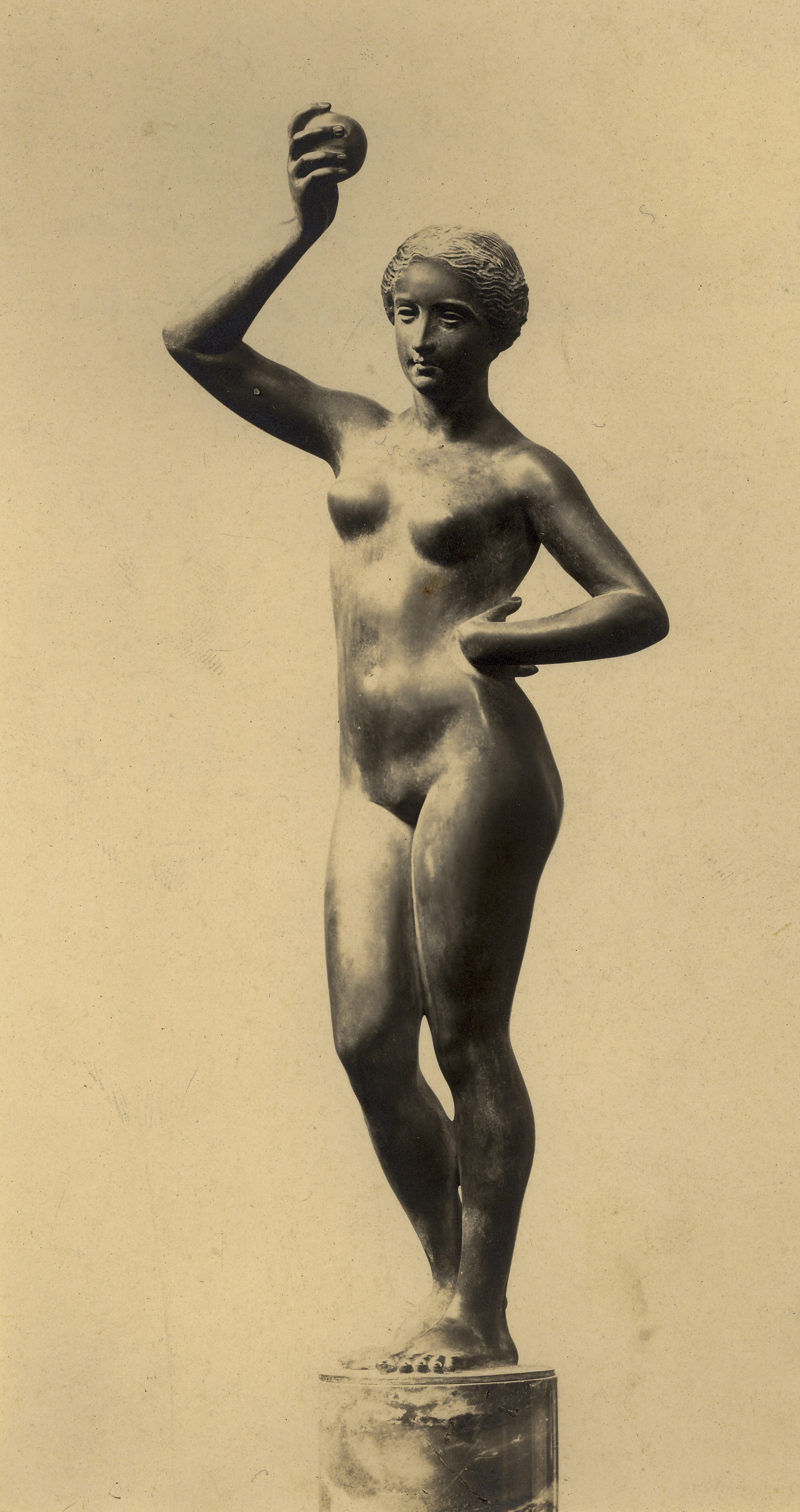
Statue of a Hesperides (Emil Julius Epple,1877-1948,)

Erytheia (Ancient Greek: Ἐρύθεια, "the red one", also latinized as Erythia or Erizia), is a figure in Greek mythology. She is a nymph and one of the three (or sometimes more) Hesperides.

== Mythology ==
Erytheia was one of the guardians of the golden apple tree, located in the Garden of the Hesperides, which belonged to the goddess Hera. The ancient Greeks generally placed this garden in the westernmost part of North Africa, near the Atlas Mountains. Erytheia guarded the apples alongside her sisters (such as Aegle and Hesperethusa) and the hundred-headed dragon Ladon.

Her parentage varies in classical sources. According to Diodorus Siculus, she and her sisters were the daughters of the Titan Atlas and Hesperis. However, in Hesiod's Theogony, the Hesperides are described as the fatherless daughters of Nyx (Night).
