= Meidias Painter =

Athenian pottery painter

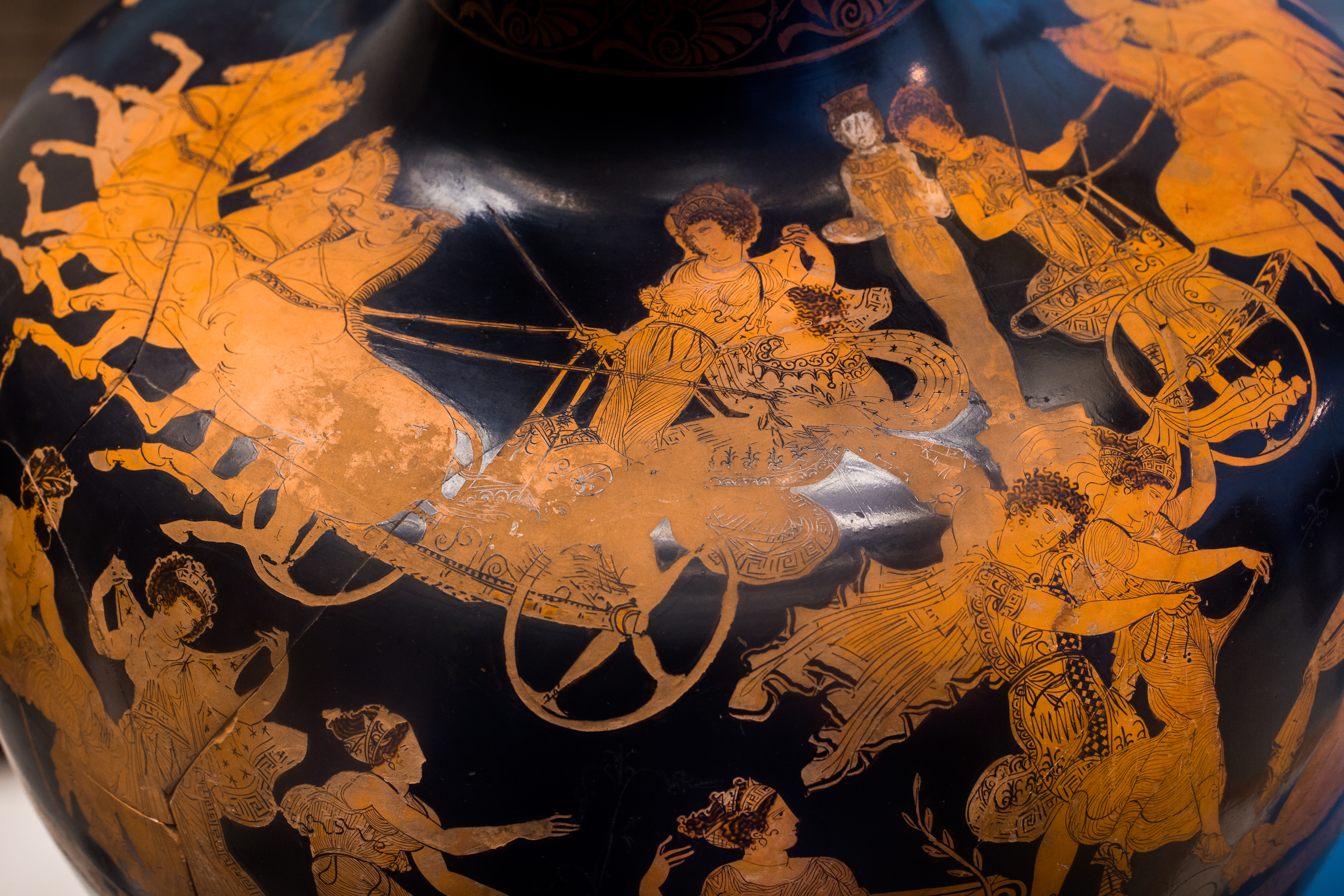
Rape of the daughters of Leucippus by the Dioscuri, hydria by the Meidias Painter, British Museum

The Meidias Painter was an Athenian red-figure vase painter in Ancient Greece, active in the last quarter of the 5th century BCE (fl. c. 420 to c. 400 BCE). He is named after the potter whose signature is found on a large hydria of the Meidias Painter’s decoration (BM E 224), excavated from an Etruscan tomb. Eduard Gerhard first identified this inscription in 1839, and it was he who determined the scene on the vase was the rape of the daughters of Leukippos where previously it was thought to be the race of Hippomenes and Atalanta.

== Overview ==
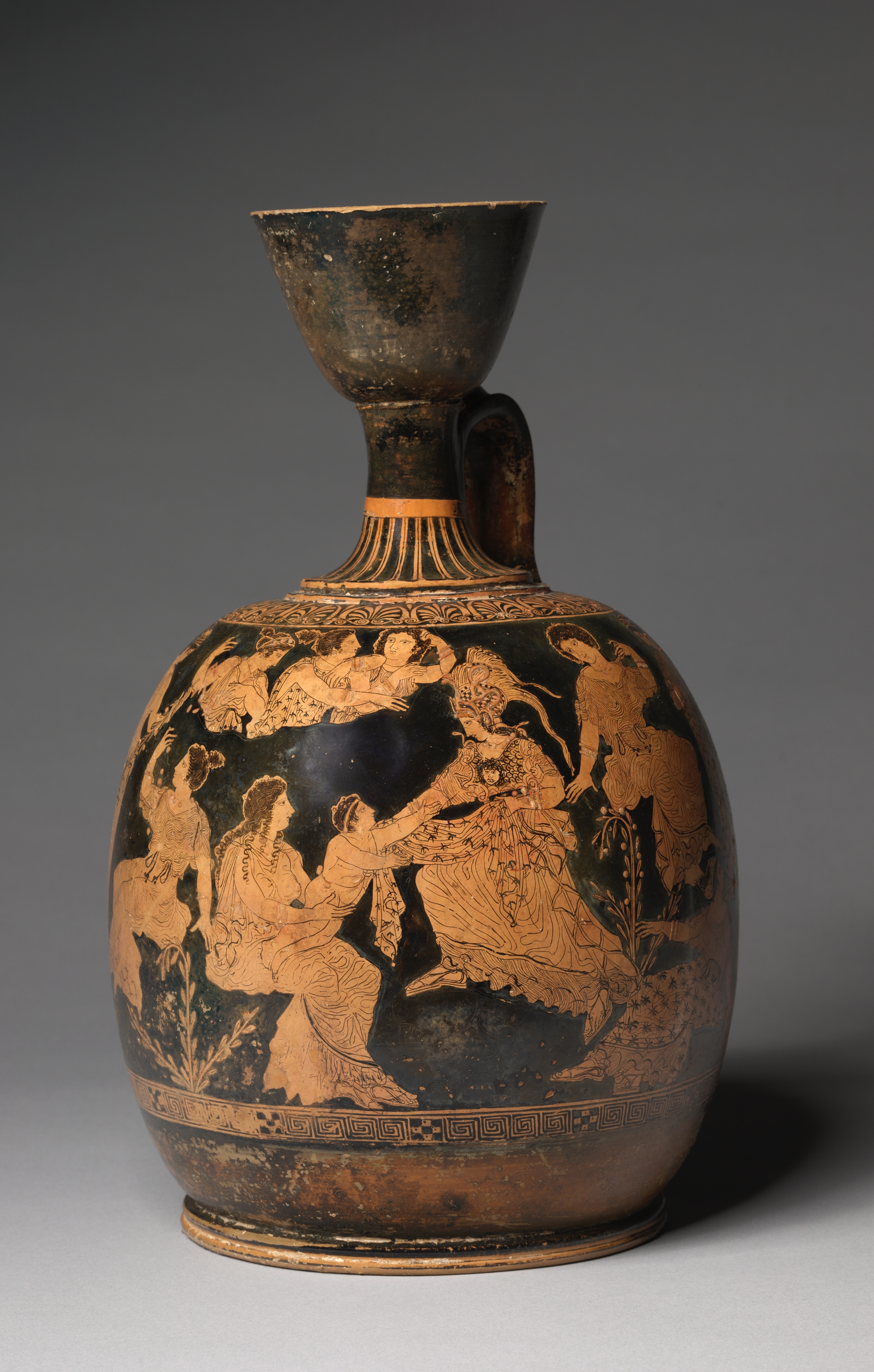
Squat lekythos; Cleveland Museum of Art

The Meidias Painter’s work bears a close similarity to his older contemporaries the Kodros Painter, the Eretria Painter and Aison; these last two have both been suggested for his teacher. Indeed, it has also been suggested that works ascribed to the Meidias Painter are in fact late works by Aison. John Beazley attributed 22 vases and fragments to the Meidias Painter with a further 2 possible ascriptions, certain attribution is complicated by the large number of followers the ornate style of the Meidias Painter engendered. His school includes 9 individually identifiable artists or groups; the total number of distinct vases Beazley gives to the Meidias Painter and his circle is 192. The latest catalogue raisonné list 36 vases by the Meidias Painter, 34 by named followers and 167 under the "manner of the Meidias Painter".

== Style ==
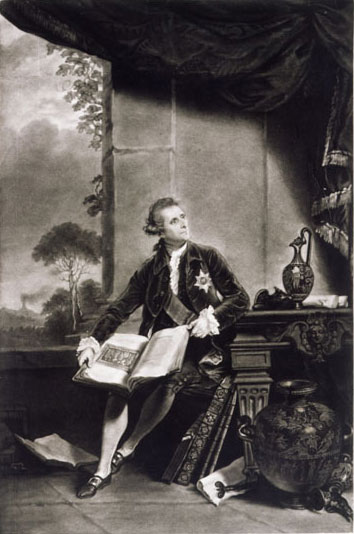
William Hamilton by Joshua Reynolds, 1777, National Portrait Gallery London, 680, depicting the Meidias Painter's name vase in the bottom right hand corner.

The Meidian style has variously been called florid or mannerist and might owe something to the Rich style of 5th century BCE Attic sculpture. His compositions are “Polygnotan” in that they do not have a single ground line but instead are arranged in tiers of friezes across the belly of the vase. The favourite shapes of Meidias Painter and his followers were hydriai amongst the larger forms and squat lekythoi, choes and a variety of pyxides and lekanides preferred for smaller pieces. Meidian figures are recognizable by their long profiles, large eyes, small mouths, rounded chins and the frequency of the three-quarters portrait. His women are slim and long-limbed, his men incline to plumpness, and both enjoy tapering fingers and toes. He pays particular attention to the details of clothing, jewellery and hair; all his women wear earrings, necklaces, hair ornaments and bracelets, their hair rendered with individual locks and elaborate coiffure and their dress usually a diaphanous, multi-pleated peplos, which billows with a flourish. His subject matter favours the mythological over the historical (the birth of Erichthonios is a recurring theme) and given that he worked at the height of the Peloponnesian War have the air of escapist fantasy.

The Meidias Painter’s name vase and chef-d’œuvre belonged originally to the first collection of Sir William Hamilton. This vase featured prominently in his portrait by Joshua Reynolds and proved to be a significant influence on the Neoclassical movement. It also took pride of place in d’Hancarville’s folio album Collection of Etruscan Greek, Roman Antiquities from the Cabinet of the Honourable William Hamilton, vol. I, 1766 (plates 127-130). It was reproduced on Wedgwood jasperware, on furniture and in paintings, and extravagantly praised by Winckelmann as “the finest and most beautiful drawing in the world”. It was acquired by the British Museum in 1772.

== Sources ==
- H. Nicole: Meidias et le style fleuri, 1908.
- J. D. Beazley: Attic Red-figured Vases in American Museums, 1918.
- W. Hahland: Vasen um Meidias, 1930.
- G. Becatti: Meidias: Un manierista antico, 1947.
- L. Burn: The Meidias Painter, 1987
- J. Boardman: Athenian Red Figure Vases, the Classical Period, 1989.
- T. Mannack: The Late Mannerists in Athenian Vase Painting, 2001.
