= Hesperis (mythology) =

Greek mythological figures

In Greek mythology, Hesperis (Ancient Greek: Ἑσπερίς, romanized: Hesperís, lit. 'evening') may refer to two separate characters:

- Hesperis, daughter of Hesperus, the brother of Atlas in a rare account recorded by Diodorus Siculus. She was given in marriage by her father to her uncle whom she bore seven beautiful daughters called Hesperides after her and Atlantides after their father. Their land, Hesperitis, situated on the western edge of ancient Libya, in the region of modern Morocco, was named after her. Later, some authors identified the Hesperitis kingdom as the kingdom of Mauretania, which actually existed in that region.
- Hesperis, one of the Horae.

== See also ==
- Hesperium
