= Hestia Tobacco =

American tobacco company

- Type: Private company
- Industry: Tobacco
- Founded: 2010
- Founder: David Sley
- Area served: United States
- Owner: David Sley
- Website: www.hestiatobacco.com

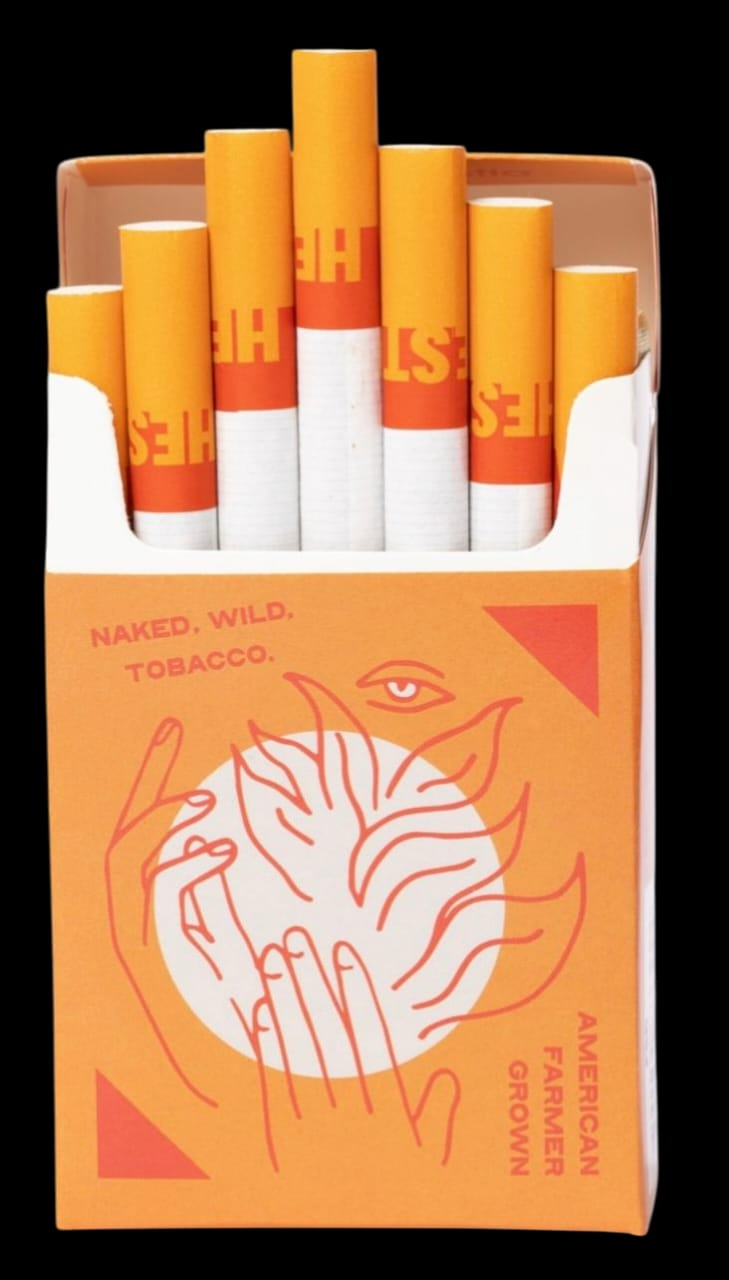
Open pack of cigarettes produced by Hestia Tobacco.

Hestia Tobacco is an independent American tobacco company founded in 2010 by David Sley. The brand is known for its artisanal, small-batch cigarettes and its positioning as an alternative to mass-market tobacco products. Hestia gained attention for its additive-free tobacco and a marketing strategy that leverages exclusivity, influencer endorsements, and cultural branding. In 2022, Hestia became the first new cigarette brand approved by the FDA in 15 years.

== History ==
=== Founding and early years (2010-2013) ===
Hestia Tobacco was founded by David Sley, a former Wall Street analyst who transitioned into commodity trading before entering the tobacco industry. While working as a soybean trader in Georgia, Sley developed relationships with former and current tobacco farmers, the former CEO of the US Tobacco Cooperative, Arnold Hamm, and a co-founder of Santa Fe Natural Tobacco Company, Chris Webster. Sley and Webster saw an opportunity to create a high-quality, small-batch tobacco product. Their goal was to produce a cigarette free from chemical additives and synthetic materials, contrasting with major tobacco brands. Sley named the brand after Hestia, the Greek goddess of the hearth, symbolizing warmth, tradition, and craftsmanship. The early Hestia cigar boxes featured bright orange packaging with a “Lichtenstein-like” design on the front and literary quotes from writers such as Hemingway and O’Hara on the back.

=== Filtered cigars (2013-2019) ===
Due to FDA restrictions on new cigarette brands, Hestia initially launched as a filtered cigar rather than a cigarette. This classification allowed it to bypass the FDA’s pre-market approval process required for cigarettes. Hestia’s filtered cigars closely resembled traditional cigarettes in size and shape but were legally categorized differently due to their weight and composition. During this period, Hestia began gaining traction within niche social circles, high-profile events, and creative communities. The brand was spotted at Fashion Week parties, art and music festivals, and exclusive social gatherings, aligning itself with a lifestyle-focused, trend-conscious audience.

=== FDA approval and cigarette launch (2022-present) ===
After a prolonged regulatory battle, Hestia received FDA approval in 2022, making it the first new cigarette brand to gain approval in over 15 years. With FDA approval secured, Hestia pivoted from filtered cigars to standard “Class A” cigarettes in select states, including Texas, Florida, Minnesota, and Mississippi. The brand emphasized "intentional smoking", targeting occasional smokers rather than daily consumers.

== Reception and controversy ==
Hestia has faced criticism from health experts who argue that its "natural" or "organic" cigarettes are no less harmful than conventional tobacco products. Studies have shown that all cigarettes, regardless of additives, pose significant health risks, including increased rates of hypertension and respiratory diseases.

Despite these concerns, Hestia continues to expand its reach, with plans for nationwide distribution in the coming years. Founder David Sley remains outspoken about his vision of a premium, independent cigarette brand, emphasizing quality over mass production.

== See also ==
- Big Tobacco
