= House of Marcus Lucretius Fronto =

House at Pompeii

Coordinates: 40°45′10″N 14°29′16″E

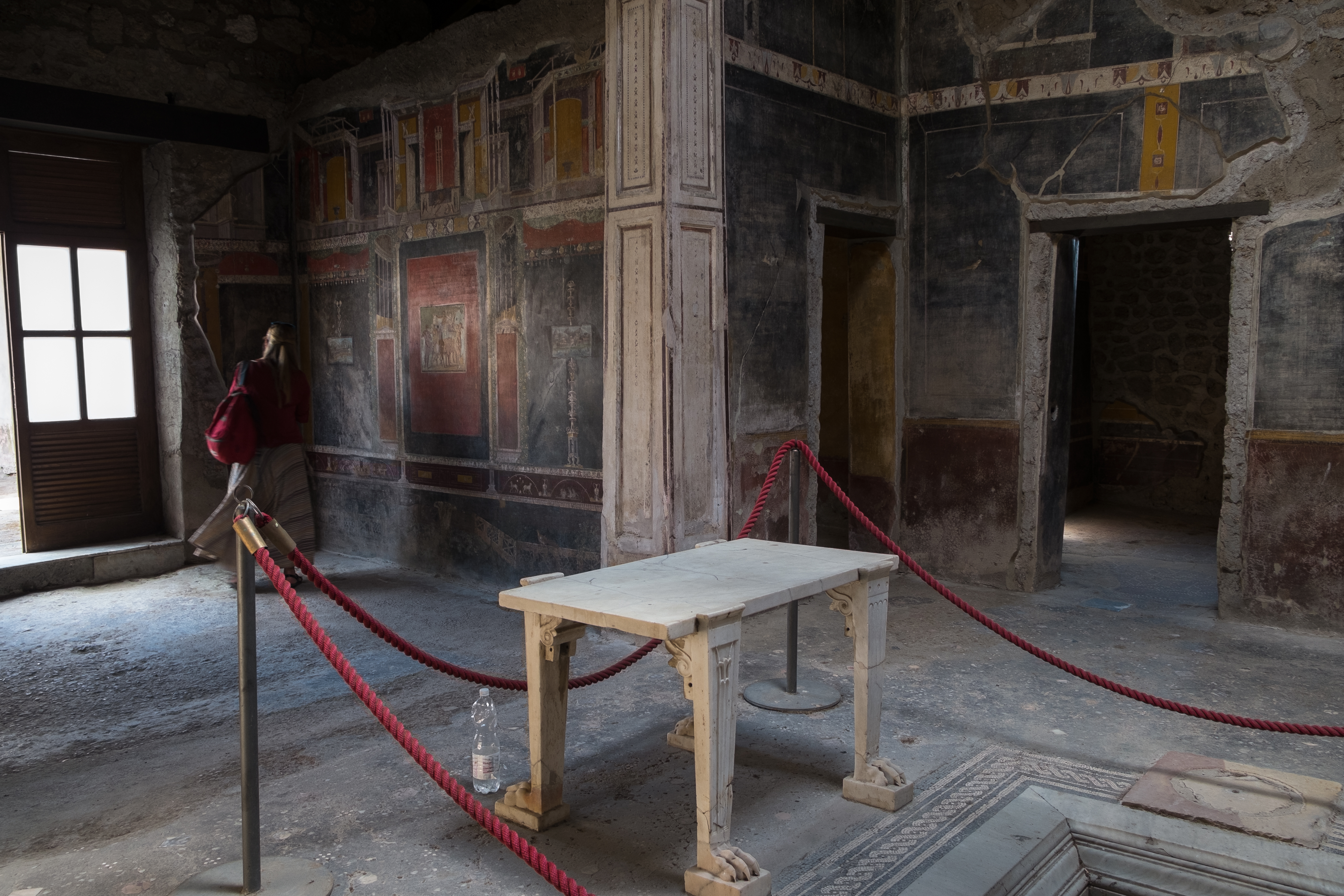
Atrium and south wall of the tablinum

The House of Marcus Lucretius Fronto (Italian: Casa di Marco Lucrezio Frontone, V.4.a) is a Roman house in Pompeii with well-preserved wall paintings in both the late Third Style as well as the Fourth Style.

== Late Third Style paintings ==
Several rooms are decorated in the late Third Style including the atrium, tablinum and bedroom 5. Roger Ling considers these to be the locus classicus of the late Third Style and dates them to about 35 CE to 45 CE.

The atrium is the simplest with black fields divided by golden yellow bands. Each field has a small figural detail in the centre, including a bird, a dog chasing a deer and a dog catching a hare. The upper zone of the wall has insubstantial architectural elements typical of Third Style.

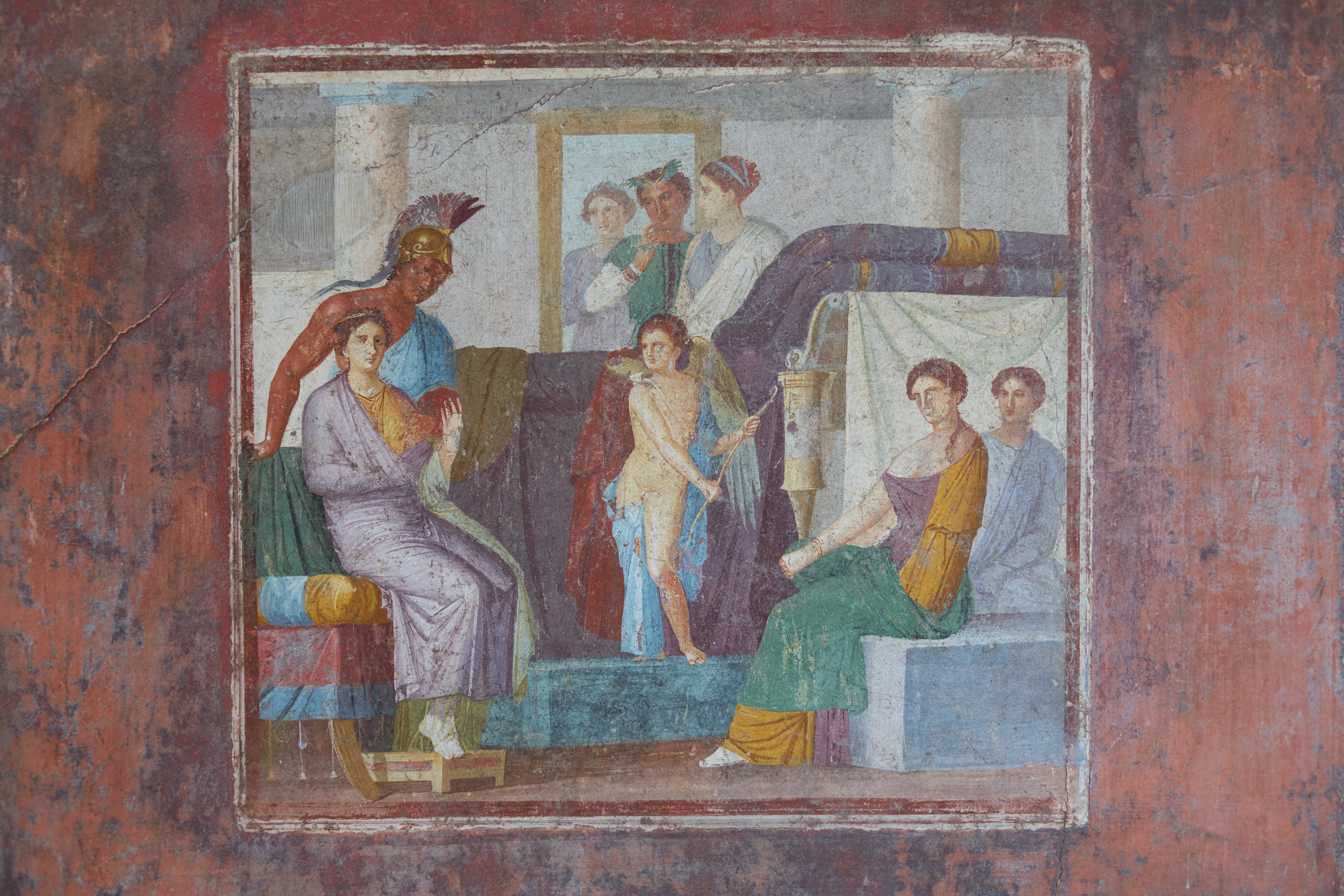
Courtship of Mars and Venus, north wall of tablinum

The tablinum's two main walls have very elaborate decoration including perspectival architecture in the upper zone, perspectival gardens in the dado, and aediculae with figural paintings at their centre in the main zone. The north wall's central panel shows Mars courting Venus.

Bedroom 5 has perspectival architecture with a fairly complicated arrangement of background fields in red, black, and yellow, featuring small ornamental figures such as caryatids and sphinxes.

== Fourth Style paintings ==
Bedroom 6 is painted in the Fourth Style with a bright golden yellow background. It contains two central figural panels. The first shows Narcissus gazing into his reflection. The second shows Xanthippe (sometimes called Pero) breastfeeding her father Mykon. On either side of the entrance are two tondos, one depicting Hermes.

Two walls of the house's garden have fourth style large-scale paintings of animals, mostly chasing each other, including a lion and a bear.

== General references ==
- Ling, Roger (1991). Roman painting. London: Cambridge university press. ISBN 978-0-521-30614-0.
- Peters, W. J. Th (1993). La casa di Marcus Lucretius fronto a Pompei e le sue pitture. Scrinium. Amsterdam: Thesis publ. ISBN 978-90-5170-163-0.
- Wynia, S.L. (1982). "The excavations in and around the House of Marcus Lucretius Fronto". La regione sotterrata dal Vesuvio. Studi e prospettivi, Atti del convegno internazionale 11–15 novembre 1979. Naples: Universita degli Studi di Napoli.
