= Kulina =

Kulina may refer to:

- Kulina (Aleksinac), village in central Serbia
- Kulina (Derventa), a village in Bosnia and Herzegovina
- Kulina (Kalesija), a village in Bosnia and Herzegovina
- Kulina, Estonia, village in Vinni Parish, Lääne-Viru County, Estonia
- Kulina people, an indigenous people of Brazil and Peru
  - Kulina language

== Other ==
- Culina (disambiguation)
- Kulin (disambiguation)
