= Misono (disambiguation) =

Misono, born Misono Kōda in 1984, is a Japanese singer-songwriter and TV personality.

Misono may also refer to:

- Misono, Mie, a village in Ise, Japan
- Misono Knife, a brand of knives made by Korin Japanese Trading Company
- Misono Station, a metro station in Sapporo, Japan
- Misono Chūōkōen Station, a railway station in Hamamatsu, Japan
- Mariko Misono, a character in the .hack anime and video games
