= Culina =

Culina may refer to:

== Architecture ==
- The kitchen in an ancient Roman house, or domus

== Companies ==
- Culina Group, UK logistics company

== Languages ==
- Culina language (disambiguation), several languages
- Kulina language, an Arauan language of Brazil and Peru spoken by about 4,000 people

== People ==
- Čulina, Croatian surname
- Branko Culina (born 1957), football coach and former player
- Jason Culina (born 1980), football player
- Kulina people, an indigenous people of Brazil and Peru

== See also ==
- Kulina (disambiguation)
