= Korin =

== People ==
Korin may refer to:

- Halyna Korin (1926–2014), Ukrainian-born Australian musician
- Korin Louise Visocchi (born 1982), Detroit musician and artisan
- Ogata Kōrin (尾形光琳1658–1716), Japanese painter of the Rinpa school, often referred to as just Kōrin
- Pavel Korin (1892–1967), Russian painter and art restorer

== Other ==
- Korin Japanese Trading Company, a kitchen knife brand
- Korin, a fictional character in Dragon Ball

== See also ==
- Corin, a given name
- Korina (disambiguation)
- Korine, a surname
