= Fauces =

Fauces may refer to:

- Fauces (throat), the opening at the back of the mouth
- Fauces (architecture), narrow passageways
