= Korina =

Korina may refer to:

- Korina language, an Arauan language of Brazil and Peru
  - An alternative name of several other languages: see Culina language (disambiguation)
- Korina people, indigenous people of Brazil and Peru
- Korina Adamou (born 2002), Cypriot footballer
- Korina Legaki, Greek singer
- Korina Perkovac (born 1999), Swiss volleyball player
- Korina Perkovic (born 1987), German former tennis player
- Korina Sanchez (born 1964), Filipino journalist
- Terminalia superba, a large tree native to tropical western Africa, known as Korina in the US

== See also ==
- Corina (disambiguation)
- Korin (disambiguation)
- Korine
- Korinna
- Korina (Alternative Rock Band)
