= Fauces (architecture) =

Architectural element

Diagram of a typical Roman domus.

Fauces is an architectural term given by Vitruvius (Arch. 3.6.3) to narrow passages on either side of the tablinum, through which access could be obtained from the atrium to the peristylar court in the rear. The Latin word faucēs means "the upper part of the throat", and figuratively refers to any kind of narrow entrance or passageway.

== Bibliography ==
- Greenough, J. B. 1890. "The Fauces of the Roman House." Harvard Studies in Classical Philology 1:1-12. (at JSTOR).
