= Culina language =

Culina or Kulina (also Culino, Kulino) may refer to:

- the Culina-Madijá language of the Arawán family
- the Kulina language of Curuça, one of the Culina-Pano languages
- the Olivença Kulina language, a Panoan language of Brazil
- Conibo language, spoken in Brazil and Peru, an official language of Peru

== See also ==
- Korina (disambiguation)
- Culina (disambiguation)
