= Čulina =

Čulina (Serbo-Croatian pronunciation: [ˈtʃulina]) is a Croatian surname.

People with the surname include:

- Antonini Čulina (born 1992), Croatian football player
- Arijana Čulina (born 1965), Croatian actress
- Branko Čulina (born 1957), a Croatian-born Australian football coach, and former player
- Jason Culina (born 1980), an Australian-born football player
- Vlado Čulina (born 1965), Croatian military officer
- Nikola Čulina (born 1974), a Croatian-born Q7 driver

== See also ==
- Culina (disambiguation), Latin for "kitchen"
