= Korin Japanese Trading Company =

Knife company

Korin Japanese Trading Company provides expensive kitchen knives from Japan. In addition to their own brand, they sell Masamoto, Misono, Glestain, and Suisin, at prices from under $50 to over $3,000. Founded in 1982 by Sakai, Osaka knife sharpener Chiharu Sugai and Saori Kawano as a wholesaler to the food service industry, Korin began selling to the public in 2001 and has become popular among celebrity chefs as well as serious cooks and collectors of fine cutlery. Korin showroom is located in Tribeca, on 57 Warren Street.

Misono knives are used in the kitchen at the White House, the residence of the president of the United States in Washington, D.C.
