= Masamoto =

- Gender: Male

Origin
- Origin: Japanese
- Meaning: Different meanings depending on the kanji used

Masamoto (written: 政基, 政元 or 正甫) is a masculine Japanese given name. Notable people with the name include:

- Hosokawa Masamoto (細川 政元; 1466–1507), Japanese daimyō
- Inoue Masamoto (井上 正甫; 1778–1858), Japanese daimyō
- Kujō Masamoto (九条 政基; 1445–1516), Japanese kugyō
- Masamoto Yashiro (八城 政基; born 1929), Japanese businessman
