= Domus =

Roman urban house of upper classes

Domus (Roman house)
- Diagram of a typical Roman domus

Ancient Roman structure

Social structure
- Social classes: Patrician, senatorial class, equestrian class, plebeian, freedmen

In ancient Rome, the domus (pl.: domūs, genitive: domūs or domī) was the type of town house occupied by the upper classes and some wealthy freedmen during the Republican and Imperial eras. It was found in almost all the major cities throughout the Roman territories. The modern English word domestic comes from Latin domesticus, which is derived from the word domus. Along with a domus in the city, many of the richest families of ancient Rome also owned a separate country house known as a villa. Many chose to live primarily, or even exclusively, in their villas; these homes were generally much grander in scale and on larger acres of land due to more space outside the walled and fortified city.

The elite classes of Roman society constructed their residences with elaborate marble decorations, inlaid marble paneling, door jambs and columns, as well as expensive paintings and frescoes. Many poor and lower-middle-class Romans lived in crowded, dirty and mostly rundown rental apartments, known as insulae. These multi-level apartment blocks were built as high and tightly together as possible and held far less status and convenience than the private homes of the prosperous.

== History ==
The homes of the early Etruscans (predecessors of the Romans) were simple, even for the wealthy or ruling classes. They were small familiar huts constructed on the axial plan of a central hall with an open skylight. It is believed that the Temple of Vesta was, in form, copied from these early dwellings because the worship of Vesta began in individual homes. The huts were probably made of mud and wood with thatched roofs and a centre opening for the hearth's smoke to escape. This could have been the beginning of the atrium, which was common in later homes. As Rome became more and more prosperous from trade and conquest, the homes of the wealthy increased in both size and luxury, emulating both the Etruscan atrium house and Hellenistic peristyle house.

== Interior ==
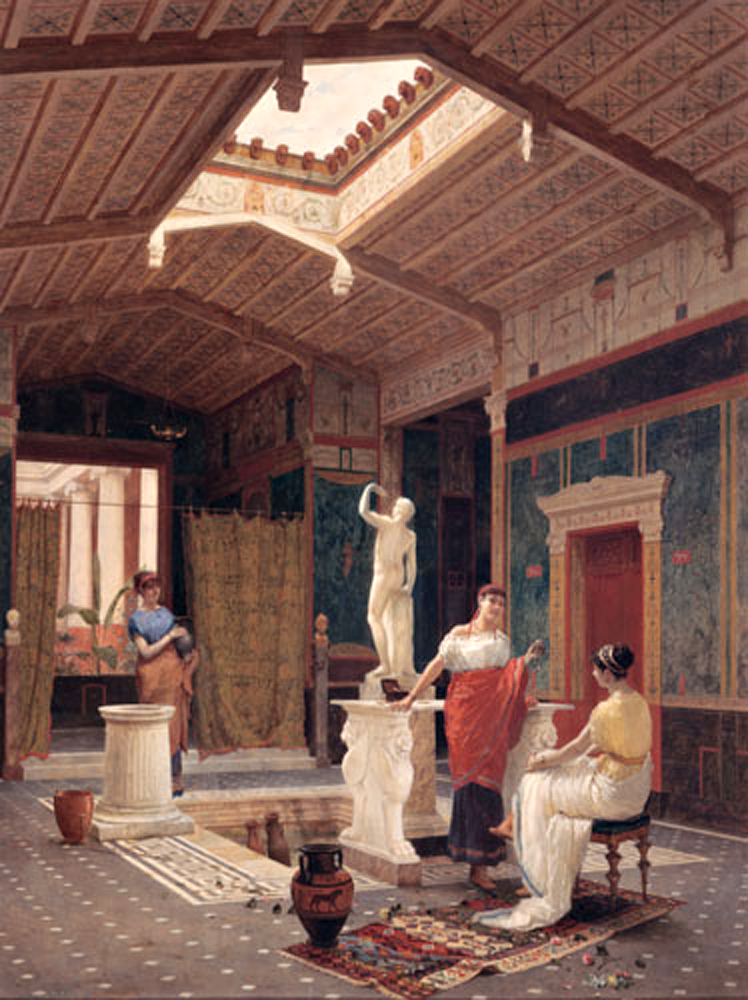
A late 19th-century artist's reimagining of an atrium in a Pompeian domus

The domus included multiple rooms, indoor courtyards, gardens and beautifully painted walls that were elaborately laid out. The vestibulum ('entrance hall') led into a large central hall: the atrium, which was the focal point of the domus and contained a statue of or an altar to the household gods. Leading off the atrium were cubicula (bedrooms), a dining room triclinium, where guests could eat dinner whilst reclining on couches, a tablinum (living room or study), and the culina (Roman kitchen). On the outside, and without any internal connection to the atrium, were tabernae (shops facing the street).

In cities throughout the Roman Empire, wealthy homeowners lived in buildings with few exterior windows. Glass windows were not readily available: glass production was in its infancy. Thus a wealthy Roman citizen lived in a large house separated into two parts, and linked together through the tablinum or study or by a small passageway.

Surrounding the atrium were arranged the master's family's main rooms: the small cubicula or bedrooms, the tablinum, which served as a living room or study, and the triclinium, or dining-room. Roman homes were like Greek homes. Only two objects were present in the atrium of Caecilius in Pompeii: the lararium (a small shrine to the Lares, the household gods) and a small bronze box that stored precious family items. In the master bedroom was a small wooden bed and couch which usually consisted of some slight padding. As the domus developed, the tablinum took on a role similar to that of the study. In each of the other bedrooms there was usually just a bed. The triclinium had three couches surrounding a table. The triclinium often was similar in size to the master bedroom. The study was used as a passageway. If the master of the house was a banker or merchant, the study often was larger because of the greater need for materials. Roman houses lay on an axis, so that a visitor was provided with a view through the fauces, atrium, and tablinum to the peristyle.

=== Interior architectural elements ===
A schematic of a domus

Vestibulum (fauces): the vestibulum was the main entrance hall of the Roman domus. It is usually seen only in grander structures; however, many urban homes had shops or rental space directly off the streets with the front door between. The vestibulum would run the length of these front tabernae shops. This created security by keeping the main portion of the domus off the street. In homes that did not have spaces for let in front, either rooms or a closed area would still be separated by a separate vestibulum.

Atrium (pl.: atria): the atrium was the most important part of the house, where guests and dependents (clients) were greeted. The atrium was open in the center, surrounded at least in part by high-ceilinged porticoes that often contained only sparse furnishings to give the effect of a large space. In the center was a square roof opening called the compluvium in which rain could come, draining inwards from the slanted tiled roof. Directly below the compluvium was the impluvium.

Impluvium: an impluvium was basically a drained pool, a shallow rectangular sunken portion of the atrium to gather rainwater, which drained into an underground cistern. The impluvium was often lined with marble and surrounded by a floor of small mosaic.

Fauces: these were similar in design and function to the vestibulum, but were found deeper into the domus. Separated by the length of another room, entry to a different portion of the residence was accessed by these passageways which would now be called halls, hallways, or corridors.

Tablinum: between the atrium and the peristyle was the tablinum, an office of sorts for the dominus, who would receive his clients for the morning salutatio. The dominus was able to command the house visually from this vantage point as the head of the social authority of the pater familias.

Triclinium: the Roman dining room. The area had three couches, klinai, on three sides of a low square table. The oecus was the principal hall or salon in a Roman house, which was used occasionally as a triclinium for banquets.

Alae: the open rooms (or alcoves) on each side of the atrium. Ancestral death masks, or imagines, may have been displayed here. The wedding couch or bed, the lectus genialis, was placed in the atrium, on the side opposite the door or in one of the alae.

Cubiculum: bedroom. The floor mosaics of the cubiculum often marked out a rectangle where the bed should be placed.

Culina: the kitchen in a Roman house. The culina was dark, and the smoke from the cooking fires filled the room as the best ventilation available in Roman times was a hole in the ceiling (the domestic chimney would not be invented until the 12th century CE). This is where slaves prepared food for their masters and guests in Roman times.

Posticum: a servant's entrance is also used by family members wanting to leave the house unobserved.

== Exterior ==
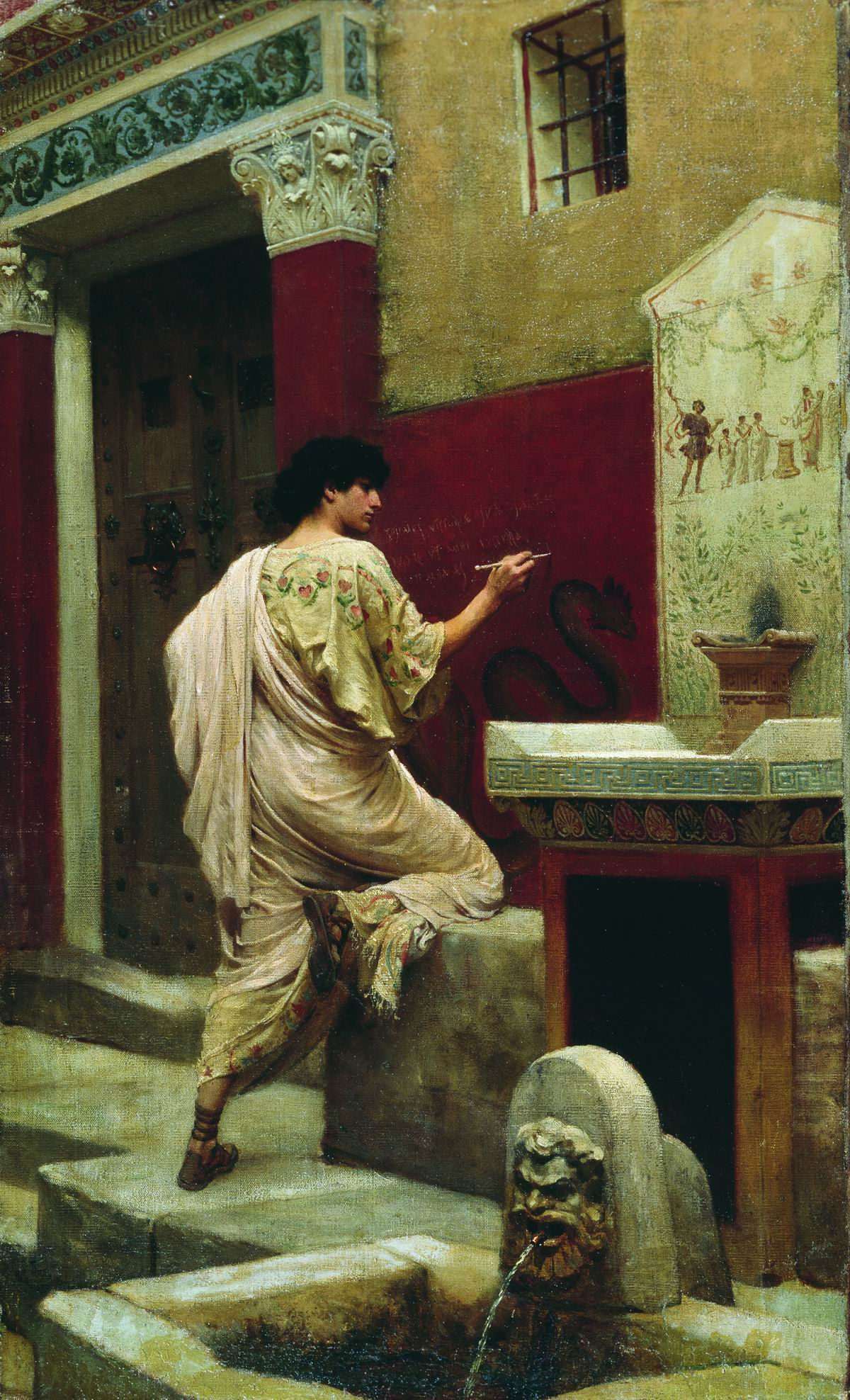
The exterior of the domus depicting the entrance with ostium

The back part of the house was centred on the peristyle, much as the front centred on the atrium. The peristylium was a small garden often surrounded by a columned passage, the model of the medieval cloister. Surrounding the peristyle were the bathrooms, kitchen and summer triclinium. The kitchen was usually a very small room with a small masonry counter and wood-burning stove. The wealthy had a slave who worked as a cook and spent nearly all his or her time in the kitchen. During a hot summer day the family ate their meals in the summer triclinium to stave off the heat. Most of the light came from the compluvium and the open peristylium.

There were no clearly defined separate spaces for slaves or for women. Slaves were ubiquitous in a Roman household and slept outside their masters' doors at night; women used the atrium and other spaces to work once the men had left for the forum. There was also no clear distinction between rooms meant solely for private use and public rooms, as any private room could be opened to guests at a moment's notice.

=== Exterior architectural elements ===
- Ostium, the entrance to the domus.
- Tabernae
- Compluvium, the roof over the atrium, which was purposely slanted to drain rainwater into the impluvium pool. This was generally sloped inwards, but many designs have the roofs sloping in the opposite direction away from the center opening.
- Peristyle
- Piscina
- Exedra

== Archaeology ==
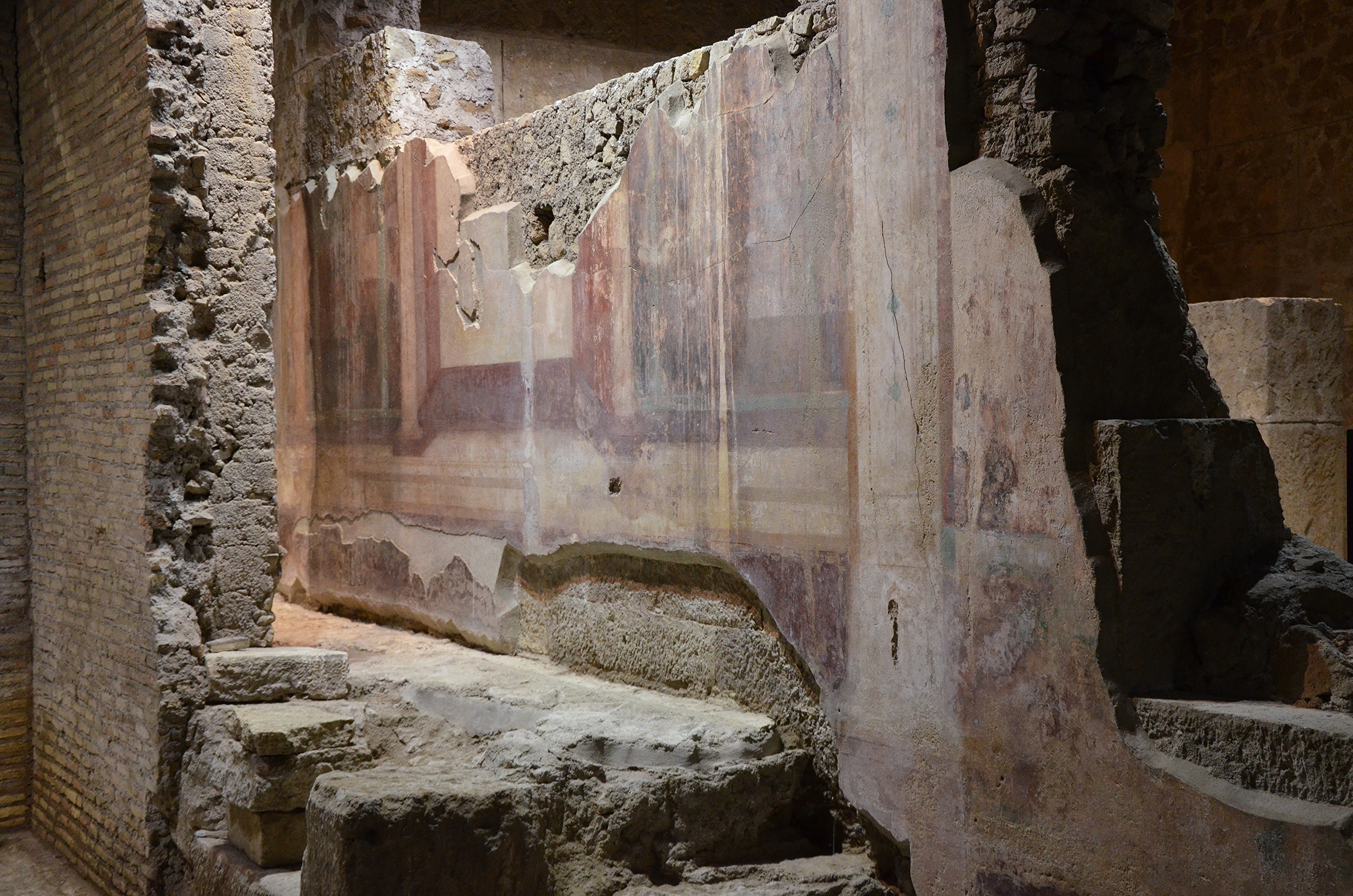
House of Augustus, Palatine Hill, Rome

Much of what is known about the Roman domus comes from excavations at Pompeii and Herculaneum. While there are excavations of homes in the city of Rome, none of them retained the original integrity of the structures. The homes of Rome are mostly bare foundations, converted churches or other community buildings. The most famous Roman domus is the House of Augustus. Little of the original architecture survives; only a single multi-level section of the vast complex remains. Even in its original state, the House of Augustus would not have been a good representation of a typical domus, as the home belonged to one of Rome's most powerful, wealthy and influential citizens. In contrast, the homes of Pompeii were preserved intact, exactly as they were when they were occupied by Roman people 2,000 years ago.

The rooms of the Pompeian domus were often painted in one of four Pompeian Styles: the first style imitated ashlar masonry, the second style represented public architecture, the third style focused on mythological creatures, and the fourth style combined the architecture and mythological creatures of the second and third styles.

== The home in Roman culture ==
The home's importance as a universally recognized haven was written about by Cicero after an early morning assassination attempt. He speaks of a commune perfugium, a universal haven or the agreed normal refuge of an individual:

I am the consul for neither the forum ... nor the campus ... nor the Senate House ... nor house, the common refuge of all, or bed, the place granted us for repose, nor the seat of honor have ever been free from ambush and peril of death

— Cicero

The concept of legal abode such as domicilium or today's usage "domicile" is a documented and legal standard, common in Western society for thousands of years. An early reference to domicilium is found in the Lex Plautia Papiria, a Roman plebiscite enacted in 89 BC. Under this law, Italian communities that had previously been denied could now gain citizenship.

== See also ==
Media related to Domus at Wikimedia Commons

- Roman architecture
- Roman villa
- House of the Cascade at Utica – typical of most Roman houses excavated in North Africa
- Townhouse (Great Britain) – house of equivalent function in early modern and modern Britain
- Hôtel particulier – house of equivalent function in early modern and modern France
