= Korina Legaki =

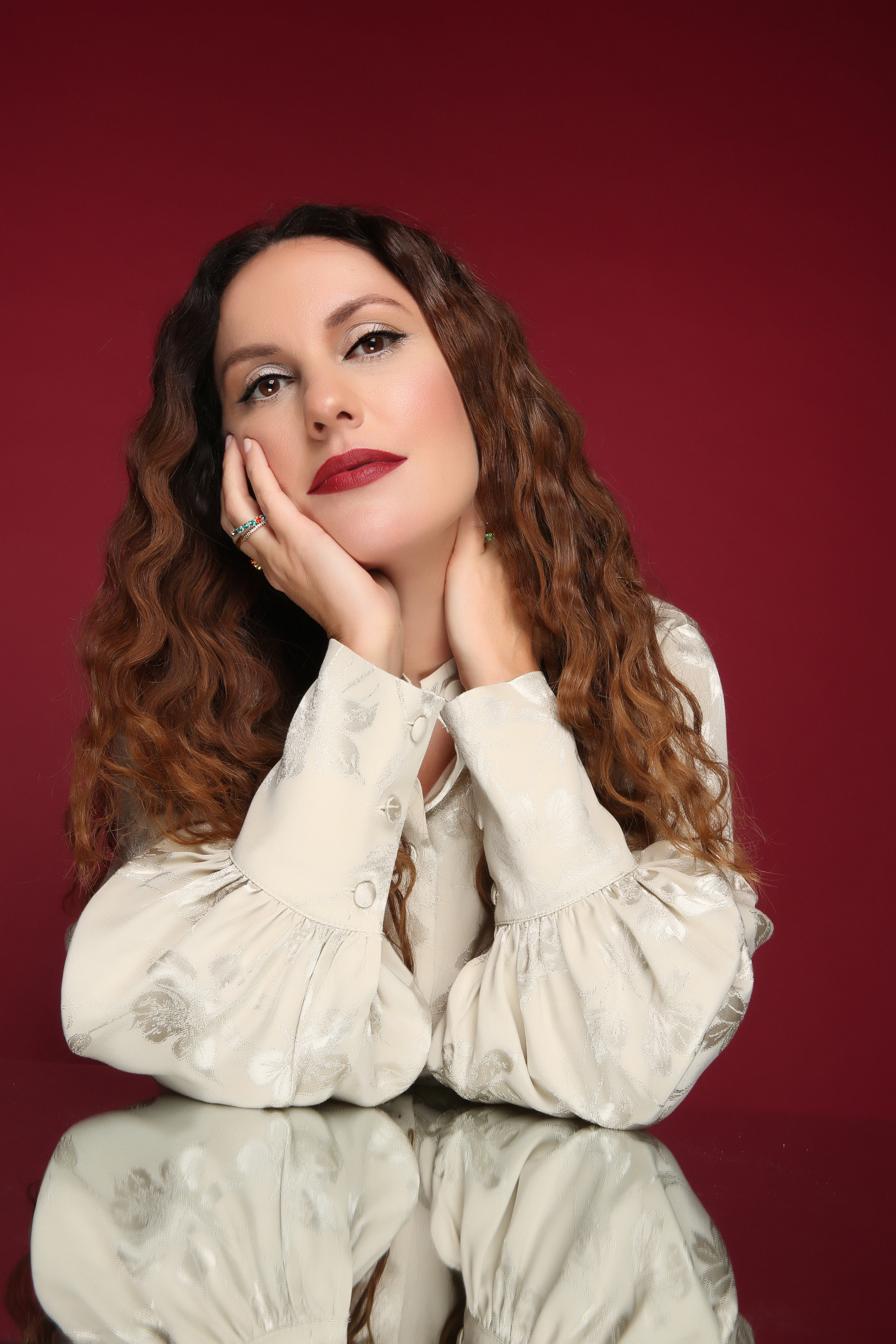

Background information
- Origin: Herakleion, Crete, Greece
- Genres: World, classical, jazz, entechno

Korina Legaki (Greek: Κορίνα Λεγάκη) is a Greek singer. She trained in classical and jazz singing, piano and orthophony, and participated in Spyros Sakkas's Vocal Art Workshop.

She holds a Diploma in Contemporary Singing from the Greek National Conservatoire (tutor: Elisavet Karatzoli). She has also participated in Spyros Sakkas's Vocal Art Workshop and is currently studying Byzantine Monody under Christos Chalkias. A multilingual and multicultural persona, she has recorded six solo records with original material as well as covers of Greek and foreign composers. She has recorded and performed with musicians, composers, singers and ensembles across several genres from free jazz to traditional and from academic to ethnic. She has sung in theaters, concert halls and various venues throughout Greece and abroad, including the Odeon of Herodes Atticus, the Athens Concert Hall, the Zappeion, the temple of Poseidon in Sounio, the Anglican Church of St. Paul's, Palazzo Altemps (Rome), and the European Parliament. At the same time, she has undertaken significant volunteering work, joining forces on stage and in studios with refugee children.

Her latest solo album, Sekans (2023), features new songs by composers and lyricists of her generation. Korina is also the main performer of composer Giorgos Andreou's upcoming record, which puts to music some important contemporary and classical poetry and prose. Korina is also the primary performer on composer Giorgos Andreou’s upcoming record, which sets some significant contemporary and classical poetry and prose to music. She is also featured, together with Eleni Tsaligopoulou in the musical theatre piece Marika by Giorgos Andreou and Odysseas Ioannou.
