= Kulina, Osmaci =

Kulina Кулина
- Village
- Location within Bosnia and Herzegovina
- Coordinates: 44°24′00″N 19°00′00″E
- Country: Bosnia and Herzegovina
- Entity: Republika Srpska
- Municipality: Osmaci
- Time zone: UTC+1 (CET)
  - Summer (DST): UTC+2 (CEST)

Kulina (Cyrillic: Кулина) is a village in the municipality of Osmaci, Bosnia and Herzegovina.
