= Tablinum =

Room between the peristyle and atrium in Roman home architecture

Architectural details of a Domus italica with the tablinum marked number 5

In Roman architecture, a tablinum (or tabulinum, from tabula, board, picture) was a room in a domus (house) generally situated on one side of the atrium and opposite to the entrance; it opened in the rear onto the peristyle, with either a large window or only an anteroom or curtain. The walls may be richly decorated with fresco pictures, and often busts of the family were arranged on pedestals on the two sides of the room.

== Description ==
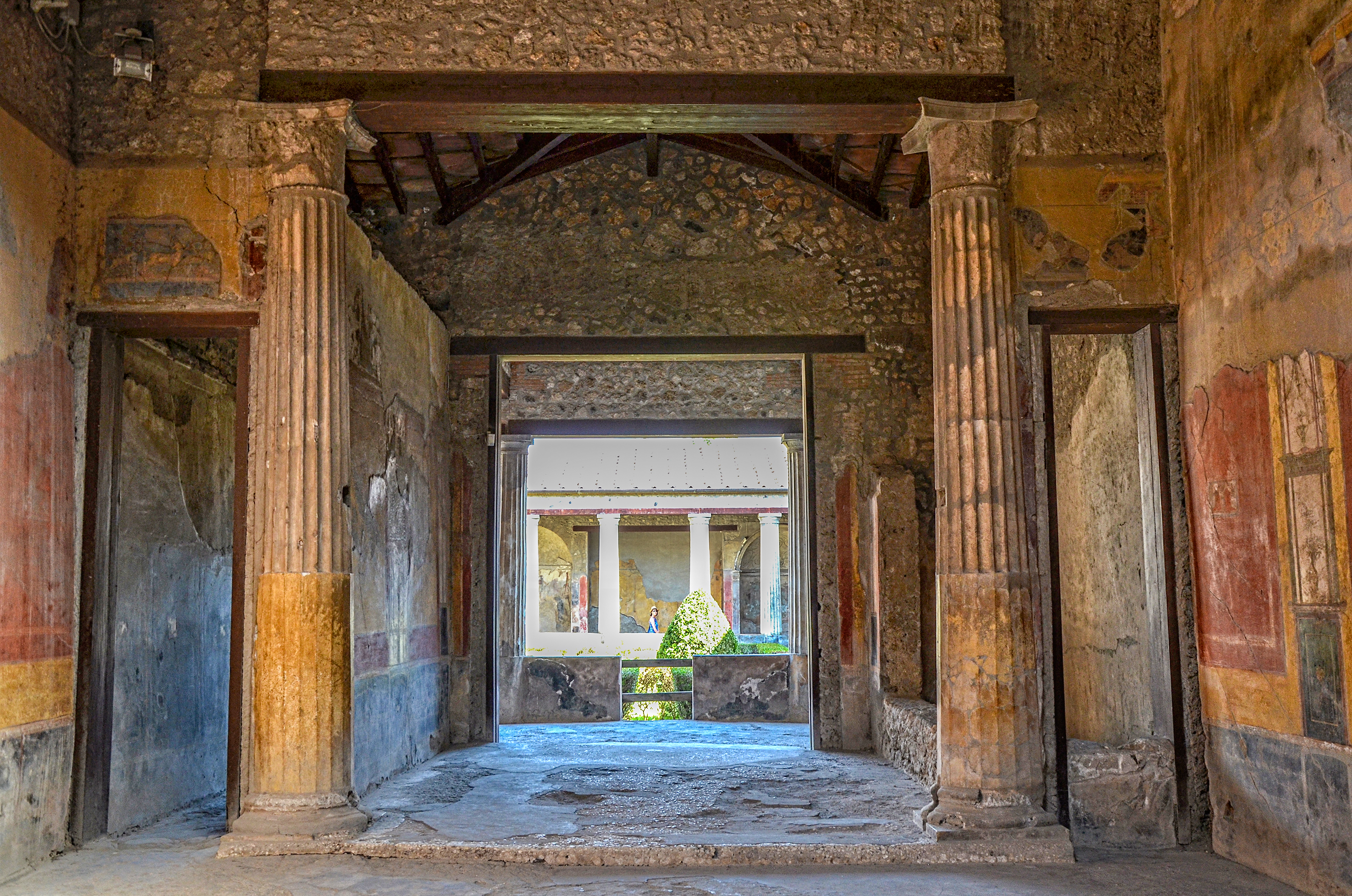
The tablinum of the House of Menander (Regio I), Pompeii

The tablinum was the office in a Roman house, the owner's centre for business, where he would receive his clients. According to one hypothesis, it was originally the master bedroom.

== Takhtabush ==
Takhtabush is the Arabic term for a tablinum. Like the ancient Roman tablinum, it opens onto a heavily shaded courtyard and, on the other side, a rear garden. Unlike the Roman tablinum, the garden side is closed with a mashrabiya lattice (Roman tablinums may have had open-weave curtains.)

If there is a wind, it tends to blow down into the windward court and up out of the leeward court. A draft can, however, be driven by convection. One of the courts will generally be hotter than the other; which is hotter may vary. The courtyard is often pale, paved and narrow, and may be shaded by an awning and evaporatively cooled by a fountain. The garden is generally darker in colour, but evaporatively-cooled by evapotranspiration. The larger court will generally be less shaded by its own walls, and more exposed to hot winds; it may also be less sheltered by surrounding rooms. From both wind pressure and convection forces, the hottest air in the hotter court rises and escapes over the wall, pulling fresh air from the cooler courtyard through the takhtabush into the hotter court. The cooler court is replenished with air from the side (drawn through doors, evaporatively-cooled projecting mashrabiya bow windows, and small vents in the wall), or from above, which cools by contact with masonry and evaporative cooling. The takhtabush thus has a strong cross-breeze from the cooler court. The breeze is at least partly driven by convection, and may also be driven by wind pressure and evaporative cooling, so the gardens and courtyards are used as windcatchers.

Similar systems may be used to create a cool, breezy public roofed space between two public squares.

== See also ==
- Tsubo-niwa – a similar traditional Japanese architectural element
- Windcatcher - an architectural element used to create cross ventilation and passive cooling
