= Corinna (disambiguation) =

Corinna or Korinna was an ancient Greek lyric poet.

Corinna may also refer to:

== People ==
- Corinna (given name) a female name equivalent to Corinne
- Heather Corinna (born 1970) writer on sexuality
- Corinna, Ovid's (probably fictitious), lover in the Amores
- Pen name of English poet Elizabeth Thomas (1675–1731)

== Places ==
- Corinna, Maine, town in Penobscot County, Maine, United States
  - Corinna (CDP), Maine, the primary village in the town
- Corinna, Tasmania, a locality in Australia
- Corinna Township, Wright County, Minnesota, United States

== Biology ==
- Corinna (spider), genus of corinnid sac spiders
- Corinna (diatom), extinct genus of diatoms of uncertain placement within Bacillariophyceae

== Other ==
- "Corinna", a song by Taj Mahal on his album The Natch'l Blues
- Corinna Hodder, a character in the 2011 film Cyberbully

== See also ==
- "Corrine, Corrina", a song
- Corrina
- Corina (disambiguation)
- Corrine (disambiguation)
- Corinne (disambiguation)
