= Ana de Gonta Colaço =

Portuguese sculptor and feminist (1903–1954)

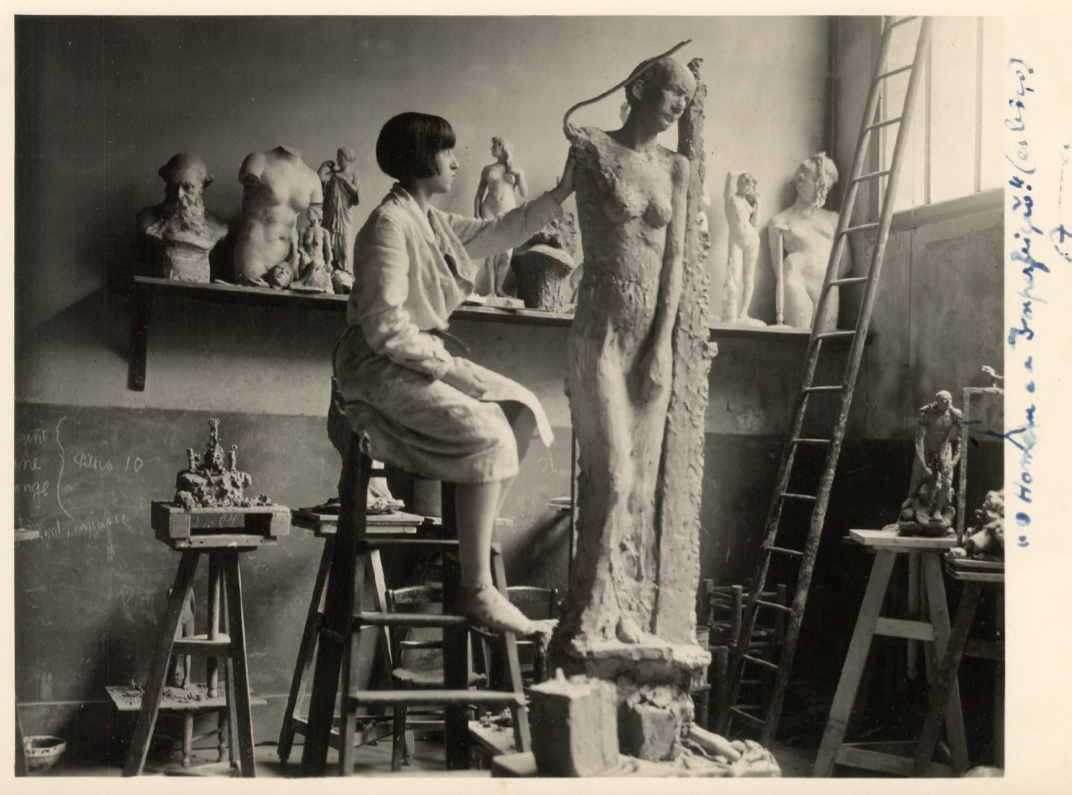
- Ana de Gonta Colaço at the Académie Julian, Paris, 1929
- Born: Ana Raymunda de Gonta Colaço; 7 November 1903; Lisbon, Portugal
- Died: 25 December 1954 (aged 51); Lisbon, Portugal
- Resting place: Prazeres Cemetery, Lisbon, Portugal
- Occupation: Sculptor
- Children: None
- Parent(s): Branca de Gonta Colaço and Jorge Colaço

Ana de Gonta Colaço (7 November 1903 – 25 December 1954) was a Portuguese sculptor, artist, and feminist.

== Early life ==
Ana Raymunda de Gonta Colaço was born on 7 November 1903 in the Portuguese capital, Lisbon. She was the daughter of the poet Branca de Gonta Colaço and the artist Jorge Colaço. Known affectionately as Aninhas, she was the couple’s third daughter, born just a year after the stillbirth of a sister. Her family was deeply connected to the intellectual and artistic circles of the time, with her parents being prominent figures in Portuguese society.

Ana was the younger sister of the lawyer, writer, and playwright Tomás Ribeiro Colaço. On her father's side, she was related to notable figures such as the pianist and composer Alexandre Rey Colaço, the actress and stage director Amélia Rey Colaço, and the painter and illustrator Alice Rey Colaço. Through her maternal lineage, she was the granddaughter of the politician and writer Tomás Ribeiro.

Colaço's childhood was one of privilege. She received an extensive home education from specialized tutors who taught her languages, literature, music, and even horseback riding. Alongside her younger sister, Maria Christina, she competed in national equestrian tournaments. Her childhood was also enriched by her family’s frequent interaction with prominent figures from high society and the cultural world. Her mother regularly hosted soirées and dinners, with distinguished guests, including Queen D. Amélia.

At the age of 17, Colaço discovered her talent for sculpture. After experimenting with small creations at home, she received encouragement from her father, who provided clay sourced from the Sacavém ceramics factory. Despite societal expectations that sculpture was an unsuitable pursuit for women and rarely led to financial independence, Colaço's parents supported her artistic ambitions. With their encouragement, she began taking formal sculpture classes.

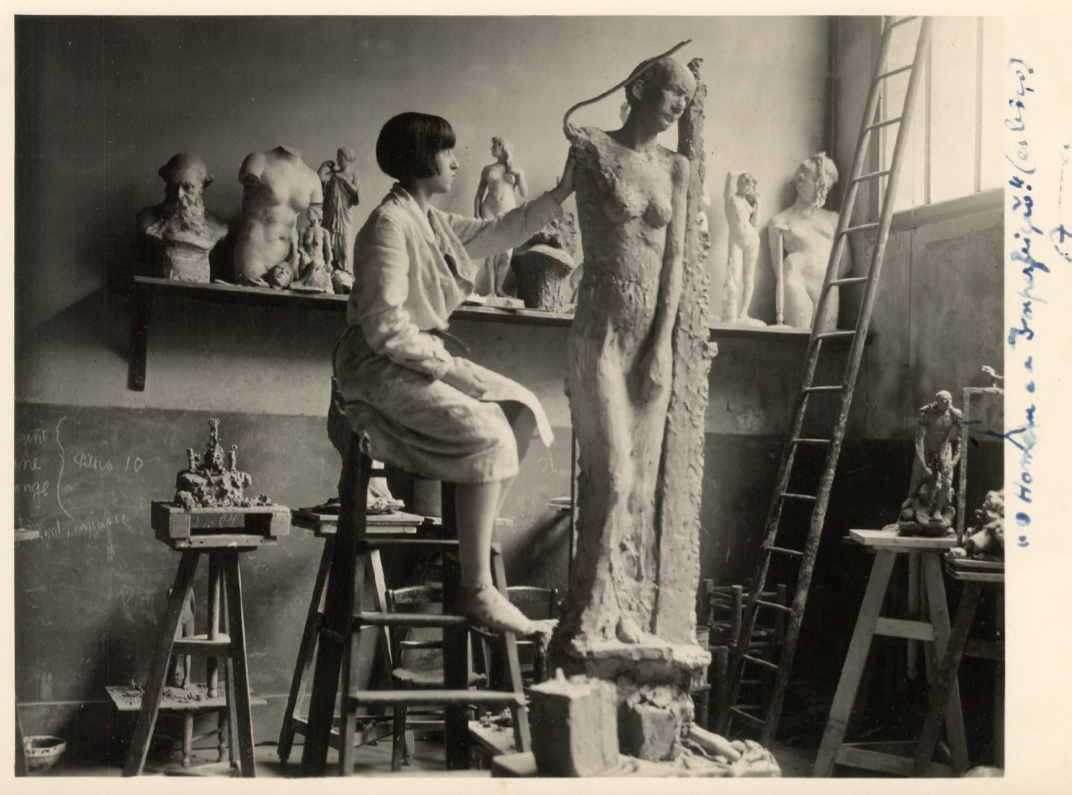
Colaço working at the Julian Academy

== Feminism ==
During this period, Colaço began embracing feminist ideas, adopting a bold and unconventional style for the time. She cut her hair short, dressed in men’s suits and ties, and wrote poems and essays addressing the condition of women in Portugal. These choices, along with her writings, sparked speculation about her sexual orientation.

Colaço’s identity as a lesbian was known to her family, who sought to shield her from public scrutiny in the deeply conservative society of early 20th-century Portugal. Despite these challenges, she became an active member of the feminist Conselho Nacional das Mulheres Portuguesas (National Council of Portuguese Women), joining alongside her mother, Branca de Gonta Colaço.

== First exhibitions ==
In April 1923, Colaço exhibited her first work at the National Society of Fine Arts exhibition in Lisbon. She received an honorable mention for a small plaster statue titled Onda (Wave), which depicted a female nude lying on the foam of a wave. The reviews were mixed, with some praising the work while others criticized the artist.

In 1924, Colaço held her first solo exhibition at the Salão Bobone in Lisbon. Despite receiving harsh criticism in several newspaper articles, including one that claimed "Sculpture can never be the art of a woman," the exhibition’s inauguration was attended by many prominent figures from the world of art, culture, politics, and Portuguese feminist activism. Notable attendees included the painters Eduarda Lapa and Mily Possoz, and the sculptor António Teixeira Lopes.

== Training in Paris ==
In 1927, Colaço graduated from the School of Cinematographic Art in Lisbon. Having developed her artistic talent, she left Lisbon for Paris in 1929, traveling via the Prado Museum in Madrid. In Paris, she joined the Julian Academy, becoming a pupil of Paul Landowski and Alfred-Alphonse Bottiau. After seven months, she was invited to exhibit at the Salon d'Automne (Autumn Salon), with a work titled Pele Vermelha (Red Skin), marking a departure from the naturalist style she had followed in Portugal and a move toward modernism. Recalling her childhood nickname, all of her works were signed "Aninhas." During the 1930s, she moved between Paris, London, Lisbon, and Tangier.

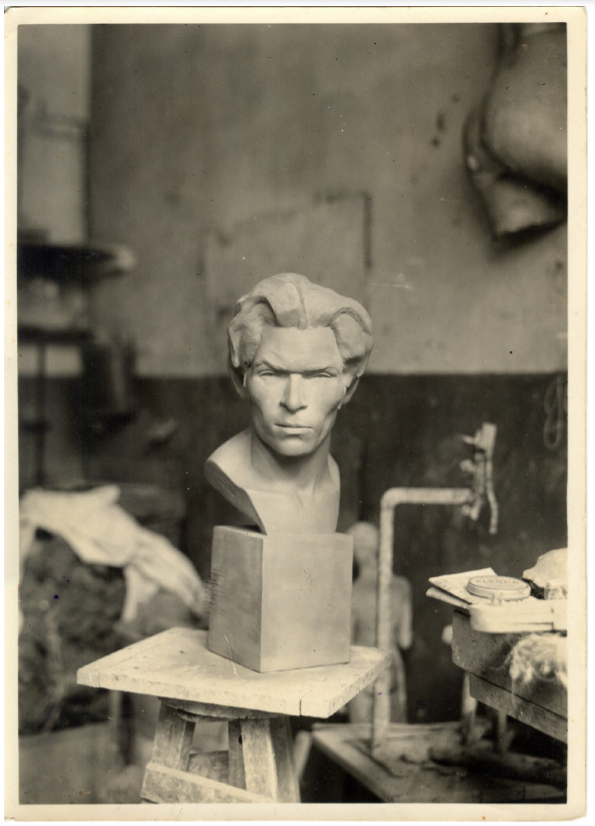
Colaço's sculpture Pele Vermelha

== Later activities ==
During one of her stays in Portugal in 1930, Colaço was invited to exhibit at an Exhibition of Ancient and Modern Feminine Work, organized by the Conselho Nacional das Mulheres Portuguesas. In 1932, she founded the Salão dos Artistas Criadores (Salon of Creative Artists), together with the painter Maria Adelaide Lima Cruz and the sculptor Maria José Dias da Câmara, with whom she was in a relationship at the time and shared a studio in Lisbon. In 1939, she faced some controversy when she publicly revealed her relationship with the singer and actress Corina Freire. One of her works, Ouvindo o Sermão (Listening to the Sermon), was rejected by the jury of the National Society of Fine Arts. Interviewed about the exhibition, she remarked, "Modernism does not exist in Portugal. Nobody knows what it is." Despite this, she was invited to exhibit at the Portuguese World Exhibition in Lisbon in 1940, where she presented a bas-relief based on a literary character created by her grandfather.

== Death ==
After her mother's death in 1945, Colaço began to show signs of poor health and chose to settle in the family home, where she continued to produce works of art and write texts on the condition of women in Portuguese society. Her last work, a monumental sculpture of the Assumption of Mary, was commissioned by the parish of Aguiar da Beira in northern Portugal. She died on 25 December 1954 at the home of her younger sister and was buried in the Prazeres Cemetery in Lisbon. Despite her relatively small output, she continues to be exhibited.
