= Corina (disambiguation) =

Corina is a given name.

Corina may also refer to:

- Corina (album), a 1991 album by the Latin singer Corina
- Corina (film), a 2024 Mexican comedy-drama film directed by Urzula Barba
- Corina (Romanian singer) or Corina Monica Ciorbă (born 1980), Romanian singer
- Corina (American singer) or Corina Katt Ayala, American singer
- Corina (Belgian singer)
- Corina or Kulina language of Brazil and Peru

== See also ==
- Corin
- Corine (disambiguation)
- Corinna (disambiguation)
- Corinne (disambiguation)
- Corrina
- Carina (name)
