= Corina =

- Gender: Female
- Language: Romanian/German

Other names
- Variant forms: Korinna, Corinna, Kora, Corri, Corinne, Corine and Coreen

Corina is a female given name of ancient Greek origin, derived from κόρη (korē) meaning "girl, maiden". Variants and diminutives include Corinna, Cori, Corri, Corinne, Corine, Kora, Korina and Korinna.

Notable people with the name Coreen, Corina or Corine include:

== Coreen ==
- Coreen Carroll, German-American cannabis activist, chef, and writer
- Coreen Grant (born 1998), Scottish rugby player
- Coreen Mary Spellman (1905–1978), American painter and printmaker
- Coreen Simpson (born 1942), American photographer

== Corina ==
- Corina (American singer) or Corina Katt Ayala, American singer
- Corina Abraham, Australian indigenous rights activist
- Corina Apostol, Romanian art curator and writer
- Corina Belcea (born 1975), Romanian classical violinist
- Corina (Belgian singer) (born as Corina Braemt), Belgian female pop singer
- Corina Brouder, American singer-songwriter and harpist
- Corina Brussaard, Dutch Antarctic scientist
- Corina (Romanian singer) or Corina Monica Ciorbă (born 1980), Romanian singer
- Corina Belcea (born 1975), Romanian violinist
- Corina Căprioriu (born 1986), Romanian judoka
- Corina Casanova (born 1956), Swiss politician
- Corina Chiriac (born 1949), Romanian singer
- Corina Claudia Corduneanu (born 1988), Romanian tennis player
- Corina Constantin (born 1991), Romanian aerobic gymnast
- Corina Crețu (born 1967), Romanian politician
- Corina Crivăț (born 1958), Romanian volleyball player
- Corina del Parral (1905–1979), Argentine writer, poet, pianist, and composer
- Corina Drăgan-Terecoasa (born 1971), Romanian luger
- Corina Dumbrăvean (born 1984), Romanian runner
- Corina Dumitrescu, Romanian politician
- Corina Dumitru (born 1973), Romanian swimmer
- Corina Freire (1897-c. 1975), Portuguese singer, actress, and impresario
- Corina Fusu (born 1959), Moldovan politician
- Corina Gredig (born 1987), Swiss politician
- Corina Grünenfelder (born 1975), Swiss alpine skier
- Corina Knoll, American journalist
- Corina Luijks (born 1995), Dutch footballer
- Corina Martín (born 1969), Argentine sprint canoer
- Corina Morariu (born 1978), American tennis player
- Corina Newsome, American ornithologist, birder, science communicator, and graduate student
- Corina Novelino (1912–1980), Brazilian philanthropist, writer, educator, medium, and Spiritist columnist
- Corina Olar (born 1984), Romanian footballer
- Corina Peptan (born 1978), Romanian chess player
- Corina Porro (born 1953), Spanish politician
- Corina Rodríguez López (1895–1982), Costa Rican educator, writer, feminist, sculptor, suffragette, and housing activist
- Corina Schröder (born 1986), German footballer
- Corina Smith (born 1991), Venezuelan singer, actress, and model
- Corina Ungureanu (born 1980), Romanian gymnast

== Corine ==
- Corine Christensen (1955–1986), American murder victim
- Corine Dorland (born 1973), Dutch cyclist
- Corine Franco (born 1983), French footballer
- Corine Hegland, American journalist
- Corine Hierckens (born 1982), Belgian racing cyclist
- Corine Mauch (born 1960), American-born Swiss politician
- Corine Onyango (born 1984/1985), Kenyan actress and radio presenter
- Corine Pelluchon (born 1967), French philosopher and professor
- Corine Rottschäfer (1938–2020), Dutch model
- Corine Schleif, German professor and art historian
- Corine van der Zijden (born 1995), Dutch racing cyclist

== See also ==
- Corinna (given name)
- Corinne (name)
- Corrina
- Tee Corinne (1943–2006), American artist and writer
- Korine, a surname
