= Corrinne =

Corrinne is a given name. Notable people with the name include:

- Corrinne May (born 1973), Singaporean Catholic musician, singer, and songwriter
- Corrinne Morrison Cliborne, usually known as Lindy Boggs (1916–2013), member of the U.S. House of Representatives
- Corrinne Mudd Brooks (1914–2008), American activist
- Corrinne Prevost, Canadian Action Party candidate in the 2004 Canadian federal election
- Corrinne Wicks (born 1968), English actress, known for parts in the BBC soap opera Doctors and in the ITV soap opera Emmerdale
- Corrinne Yu, Hong Kong-American game programmer

== Fictional Characters ==
- Corrinne Balsom, on the American daytime drama One Life to Live

== See also ==
- CORIN
- Corin
- Corinne (disambiguation)
- Corrin
- Corrine (disambiguation)
