= Maria Adelaide Lima Cruz =

Portuguese painter and theatrical designer

- Drawing by Carlos Reis of her sister Maria Antonieta, pianist and composer, the inscription visible in the photo reads A Maria Antonietta pela sua grande talente e grande bondade Carlos Reis 1921. this not a portrait of a 12 year old girl Maria Adelaide ref. Ilustracao Portuguesa no.785 5th March 1921
- Born: Maria Adelaide de Lima Cruz; 1908; Portugal
- Died: 1985 (aged 76–77); Portugal
- Occupations: Painter, theatrical designer, costume designer

Maria Adelaide Lima Cruz was a Portuguese painter, illustrator, set designer and costume designer.

== Early life ==
Maria Adelaide de Lima Cruz (1908 – 1985) was born into a family of painters and musicians, being the daughter of the painter and piano teacher, Adelaide Lima Cruz (1878 – 1963), and sister of the musicologist, Maria Antonieta Lima Cruz. Starting to draw at a young age, and becoming a pupil of Carlos Reis, she did not follow any academic training.

== Artistic career ==
Lima Cruz started illustrating professionally in 1921 at the age of 12 for the magazine Ilustração Portuguesa. She first exhibited her art in 1921 in an exhibition with her mother who contributed only two paintings. She would go on to have around 40 individual exhibitions in Portugal and France, spending some time in Paris in 1934 under a government scholarship. While in Paris she achieved success with costumes designed for Corina Freire, the Portuguese actress and singer, who wore them in a show performed with Maurice Chevalier.

In 1928, she debuted as a stage and costume designer for what was known in Portugal as a "magazine" show (Vaudeville). Her initial, cosmopolitan, colourful and elegant style, adapted well to such shows. Her costumes became famous and for the rest of the 1920s and the 1930s she continued to make an important contribution to the design of shows, including ballet and opera. In 1931 she also started to exhibit objects in glass. In January 1932, she opened the Salão dos Artistas Criadores (Salon of Creative Artists), together with the sculptors Maria José Dias da Câmara and Ana de Gonta Colaço, which aimed to display only stylistically original works. Leading on from stage designs she started to do murals, including for the Casino Estoril in 1935 and for the Portuguese World Exhibition held in 1940 in Belém near Lisbon. The latter, although intended to glorify the Portuguese Estado Novo regime, actually gave an opportunity to a large number of artists, including ten women, who had artistic ideas opposed to those of the regime.

Much of the work of Lima Cruz is in private collections. However, her work can be seen in the Chiado Museum in Lisbon and at the Casa-Museu Dr. Anastácio Gonçalves in Lisbon.
