= Branca de Gonta Colaço =

Portuguese writer

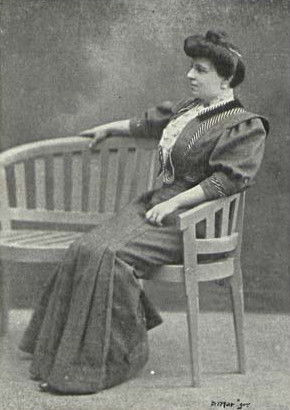
Branca de Gonta Colaço, c. 1908

Branca Eva de Gonta Syder Ribeiro Colaço (8 July 1880 – 22 March 1945), better known as Branca de Gonta Colaço, was a Portuguese writer, scholar and linguist. She was the daughter of Charlotte Ann Syder, a British poet, and the Portuguese politician and writer Tomás Ribeiro. She married Jorge Colaço, a renowned ceramist and was the mother of the sculptor, Ana de Gonta Colaço.

== Early life ==
Gonta Colaço was born in the Portuguese capital Lisbon on 8 July 1880. The surname Gonta, although found in many documents, was not an official surname, but a nickname, derived from Parada de Gonta, in Tondela, which was her father's hometown. She is of English descent through her mother. Born into one of the most influential intellectual families in Portugal at the time, she spent time during her youth with important names from the world of politics, literature and the arts, such as Maria Amália Vaz de Carvalho, António Cândido Gonçalves Crespo, Camilo Castelo Branco, who was a close friend of her father, Maria Archer, Aura Abranches and the Bordalo Pinheiro family. In 1898, at the age of 18, she married the painter and ceramic artist Jorge Rey Colaço, adopting the name Branca de Gonta Colaço from then on. The couple had four children: the lawyer, playwright and writer Tomás Ribeiro Colaço (1899-1965), the sculptor Ana Raymunda de Gonta Colaço (1903-1954) and the writer Maria Christina Raymunda de Gonta Colaço de Aguiar (1905-1996). Her first daughter died shortly after birth in 1902.

== Writing career ==
Gonta Colaço displayed an early talent for writing. She started out as a poet, actively contributing to a large number of newspapers and magazines, especially those distributed in Lisbon. These included O Dia, published by José Augusto Moreira de Almeida and O Talassa (1913–1915), a humorous newspaper which was run by her husband. She also contributed to Serões (Evenings), Illustração portugueza, Illustração and O Ocidente. Fluent in several languages, she also wrote poems in English, and is credited with translating several English works into Portuguese. Expanding her range beyond poetry, she wrote plays and chronicles that provided a valuable portrait of the Portuguese social and intellectual elites of the time.

== Feminism ==
Coming from the Portuguese elite, Gonta Colaço was a monarchist. While never converting to republicanism, she did believe that women should have a more active role in Portuguese society and free access to education. She joined the National Council of Portuguese Women (CNMP), a feminist organization that promoted and appealed for gender equality, in 1914, the year of its foundation. Working intensely within the organization, together with the republican and feminist activist Adelaide Cabete and others, she presided for several years over the Peace (1928-1934) and Art (1936-1937) sections of the council. She also contributed to Alma feminina, the council's bulletin.

== Death ==
Gonta Colaço died in Lisbon on 22 March 1945.

== Legacy and Tributes ==
With her work recognized in Portugal, Brazil, France and Spain, Gonta Colaço was distinguished by several Portuguese and foreign scientific and literary societies. She was made an Officer of the Military Order of Saint James of the Sword in 1931. In 1949, Lisbon City Council named a street after her. In the following years, her name was also given to other streets and squares in the municipalities of Almada, Sesimbra, Cascais and Tondela. A poetry prize was established in her name in Tondela.
