= Corinne =

Corinne may refer to:

== Places ==
- Corinne, Saskatchewan, Canada, an unincorporated community
- Corinne, Oklahoma, United States, an unincorporated community
- Corinne, Utah, United States, a town
- Corinne, West Virginia, United States, a census-designated place

== People and fictional characters ==
- Corinne (name), a given name, including a list of people and fictional characters with the name
- Tee Corinne (1943–2006), American photographer, author, and editor
- Corinne Kimball, a performer best known as Corinne.

== Other uses ==
- Corinne (horse), a 19th-century British Thoroughbred racehorse
- Corinne, an 1807 novel by Germaine de Staël

== See also ==
- Corrine (disambiguation)
- Corrinne, given name
- Chorine, a female chorus girl
- Corine (disambiguation)
- Coreen
