= Corine (disambiguation) =

Corine refers to Coordination of Information on the Environment, a programme of the European Union

Corine or CORINE may also refer to:

- Corine (given name), people with the name
- Corine, Texas, an unincorporated community
- Corine Literature Prize, a German literature prize

== See also ==
- Korine, a surname
- Corinne (disambiguation)
- Corrine (disambiguation)
- Coreen
