= Dimitrie Cantemir Christian University =

Creștină Dimitrie Cantemir University
- Universitatea Creștină Dimitrie Cantemir
- Established: 2002
- Location: Bucharest, Romania; 44.414613°N 26.115257°E
- Website: www.ucdc.ro

Dimitrie Cantemir Christian University (Romanian: Universitatea Creștină "Dimitrie Cantemir") is a private university in Bucharest. The university was founded in 1990 by Momcilo Luburici and Corina-Adriana Dumitrescu as the Dimitrie Cantemir Independent University, which has since developed 17 faculties in Bucharest, Brașov, Cluj-Napoca, Constanța and Timișoara.

== Faculties ==
Bucharest

- Law and Administration (Stiinte Juridice si Administrative)
- Touristic and Commercial Management (Management Turistic si Comercial)
- International Business and Economics (Relatii Economice Internationale)
- Finance, Banking and Accountancy (Finante, Banci si Contabilitate)
- Marketing
- Education Science (Stiinte ale Educatiei)
- Foreign Languages and Literatures (Limbi si Literaturi Straine)
- History (Istorie)
- Political Science (Stiinte Politice)

== Accreditation issues ==
The Romanian newspaper Gândul reported that Dimitrie Cantemir Christian University started 34 Master's degree curricula for which it had no legal right of teaching. According to the university's rector, Corina Dumitrescu, the relevant law has a loophole, since it uses a present continuous tense, which is uncharacteristic for the Romanian language. She says that institutional evaluation (accreditation as required by law) may also happen after the curricula have been taught. The actual wording in Romanian is universitate acreditată supusă periodic evaluării instituţionale ("accredited university subject to periodical institutional evaluation"), and Dumitrescu argues that care se supun ("which are subject to") means that an accredited institution can be evaluated "today, tomorrow or the day after tomorrow" (and presumably, any time), not that its curricula would need to have been evaluated (i.e. accredited) in the past. For the study year 2010–2011, 16 Master's curricula from nine of its faculties are accredited in Order no. 4630/2010 of the Department of Education.

=== Proper qualification ===
After proper educational assessment, the Romanian Agency for Quality Assurance in Higher Education (ARACIS) issued a Degree of High Trust (Romanian: Grad de încredere ridicată) to the university, the highest qualification awarded in Romania to a higher education institution. In 2011, the university was inspected by The European University Association as an "education-centered university", meaning that it focuses more on teaching than on research. In Romania, this "education-centered university" category is the third and lowest grade that Romanian universities can get. Following this, "education-centered universities" in Romania were no longer allowed to offer postgraduate degree programmes.
