= Corinna (given name) =

Corinna or Korinna is a female given name of ancient Greek origin, derived from κόρη (korē) meaning "girl, maiden". Notably, the ancient Greek lyric poet, as well as its use by Ovid for the women he addresses in the Amores, may have both infused the name's popularity. Other variants include Corina and Corinne.

== People with the name ==
- Corinna or Korinna, ancient Greek poet

=== Corinna ===
- Corinna Adam or Ascherson (1937–2012), British journalist
- Corinna Bath, mathematician, computer scientist and university lecturer
- S. Corinna Bille (1912–1979), Swiss writer in French
- Corinna Boccacini (born 1985), Italian snowboarder
- Corinna Brown, English actress
- Corinna Chamberlain (born 1982), New Zealand-Hong Kong singer and actress
- Corinne Cléry (born 1950), French actress
- Corinna Cortes, Danish computer scientist
- Corinna Dentoni (born 1989), Italian tennis player
- Corinna Everson (née Kneuer) (born 1958), American bodybuilder champion and actress
- Corinna Folkins (née MacDonald) (1918–1998), United States lawn bowler
- Corinna Genest (born 1938), German film and television actress
- Corinna Halke (born 1957), German sports journalist and skater
- Corinna Harfouch (née Meffert) (born 1954), German actress
- Corinna Harney (born 1972), American model and actress
- Corinna Harrer (born 1991), German middle-distance runner
- Corinna Hawkes, British professor of Food Policy
- Corinna Hein (née Biethan) (born 1983), German indoor cyclist
- Corinna Kennedy (born 1970), Canadian sprint canoer
- Corinna Kopf (born 1995), American YouTuber and gamer
- Corinna Kunze (born 1963), German handball player
- Corinna E. Lathan, American entrepreneur
- Corinna Lawrence (born 1990), British épée fencer
- Corinna Lechner (born 1994), German racing cyclist
- Corinna Lin (born 1994), Taiwanese-American figure skater
- Corinna Lingnau (born 1960), German field hockey player
- Corinna Löckenhoff, German psychologist and gerontologist
- Corinna Kuhnle (née 1987), Austrian slalom canoeist
- Corinna Martini (born 1985), German luger
- Corinna May (née Meyer) (born 1970), German singer
- Corinna Miazga (1983–2023), German politician
- Corinna Mura (née Wall) (1910–1965), American cabaret singer, diseuse, and film actress
- Corinna von Rad (born 1971), German-American opera director
- Corinna Rüffer (born 1975), German politician
- Corinna zu Sayn-Wittgenstein-Sayn (née Larsen) (born 1964), German philanthropist
- Corinna S. Schindler, University of Michigan faculty
- Corinna Schnitt (born 1964), German filmmaker, artist, and professor
- Corinna Scholz (born 1989), German curler
- Corinna Schumacher, née Betsch (born 1969), German animal rights activist, wife of racing driver Michael Schumacher
- Corinna Schwab (born 1999), German sprinter
- Corinna Shattuck (1848–1910), American educator and missionary in Turkey
- Corinna Putnam Smith (née Corinna Haven Putnam) (1876–1965), American writer, amateur archaeologist, scholar of Arabic
- Corinna Tsopei (born 1944), American Olympic judoka
- Corinna Ulcigrai (born 1980), Italian mathematician
- Corinna West, American Olympic judoka
- Cori Zarek, media lawyer

=== Korinna ===
- Korinna Fink (born 1981), German sprinter
- Korinna Ishimtseva (born 1984), Kazakhstani volleyball player
- Korinna Moon Bloodgood (born 1975), American actress and model

== Pseudonyms ==
- Corinna, Ovid's (probably fictitious) lover in the Amores
- Corinna, pen name of English poet Elizabeth Thomas (1675–1731)

== Fictional characters ==
- Corinna Chapman, series of mysteries written by Kerry Greenwood
- Corinna Schmidt, 1951 East German drama film
- Beloved Corinna, 1956 German drama film
- Corinna Wiles, character in the 2007 TV series Drive
- "Corrine, Corrina", 1928 blues song
- Korrina from Pokemon XY
