= Corrine =

Corinne may refer to:

- Corinne (name)
- Corinne (horse)
- Corinne, Michigan
- Corinne, Oklahoma
- Corinne, Utah
- Corinne, Saskatchewan
- Corinne, West Virginia

== See also ==
- Corrine, Corrina, a traditional country blues song
- Corrine (disambiguation)
- Corine (disambiguation)
- Corina (disambiguation)
- Corinna (disambiguation)
- Corrina
- Coreen
