= Ceramics Museum of Sacavém =

Museum near Lisbon, Portugal

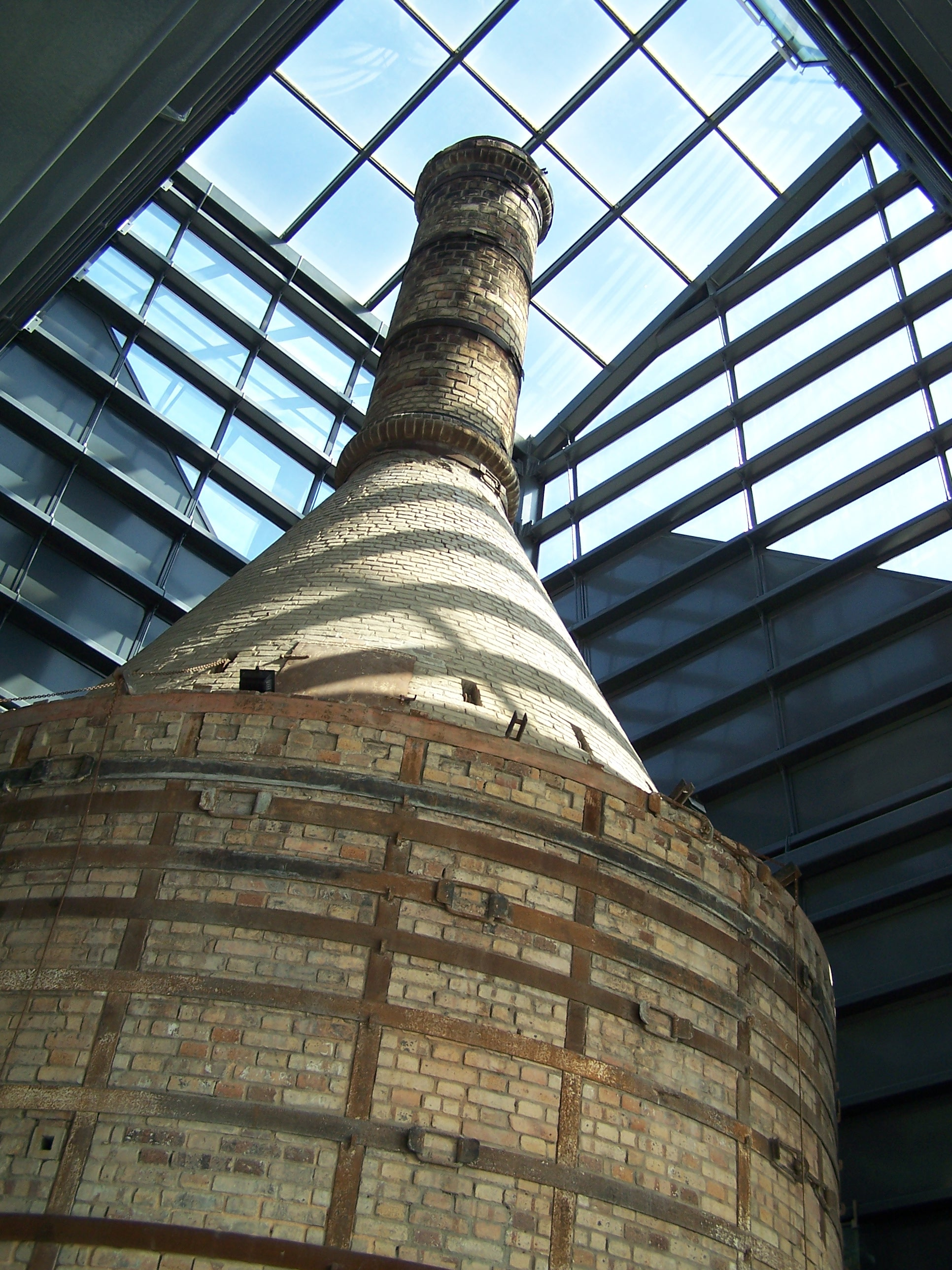
- The kiln that is the centrepiece of the museum

- Location within Portugal
- Established: 2000; 26 years ago
- Location: Urbanização Real Forte, 2685 Sacavém, Portugal
- Coordinates: 38.794187°N 9.102438°W
- Website: https://www.cm-loures.pt/Media/Microsite/Cultura/museu-de-ceramica-de-sacavem.html

The Ceramics Museum of Sacavém (Portuguese: Museu de Cerâmica de Sacavém) is situated in the town of Sacavém in the municipality of Loures, just northeast of Lisbon in Portugal. The museum was opened in July 2000 and was constructed on the grounds of a former ceramics factory. Most of the exhibits reflect the output of that factory and its documentation centre is devoted to the study of the history and production of the factory and the industrial heritage of the municipality. In 2002 the museum was awarded the Luigi Micheletti Prize in the Industrial Heritage category.

== History ==
The Fábrica da Loiça (the Crockery Factory), established by Manuel Joaquim Afonso, began work in 1856. In the few years that he owned the factory, Afonso faced financial problems and between 1861 and 1863 he sold it to an Englishman, John Stott Howorth. With the new techniques that Howorth was able to introduce from the United Kingdom, the factory expanded rapidly, producing earthenware based on kaolin. Its success led King Luís I to confer the title of Baron de Howorth de Sacavém on the owner and to give the factory the title of Royal Factory. In the last years of his life, King-consort Fernando II painted several ceramic pieces in the factory and became good friends with Howorth. After Howorth’s death in 1893, his wife, the Baroness Howorth of Sacavém, went into partnership with James Gilman, who administered it until her death in 1909, when he took over the company. Investments continued to be made in the factory which, at its peak, covered 70,000 square metres and became one of the main industrial units of the eastern industrial belt of Lisbon.

In 1912 Portugal experienced a wave of union-led strikes and the ceramic factory was not immune from this. At the same time, it had a pioneering reputation for promoting social welfare, including through the creation of a school inside the factory, the existence of a savings and loan scheme for employees, the right to paid leave, and the establishment of holiday camps for the children of the factory’s workers. During the fascist period under the Estado Novo (1933–74) employees of the factory were active in opposing the government.

The company began to experience financial difficulties from the 1970s as a result of price controls imposed by the government, some inefficient investments in the factory, and labour disputes due to the difficulties it was experiencing in paying workers. It was declared bankrupt in 1994. At this time the council of Loures decided to build the museum on the old site of the factory in order to preserve its history. The museum was opened by the then President of the Portuguese Republic, Jorge Sampaio, in 2000.

During its life the factory established a reputation for high-quality work. In addition to the production of tableware it was responsible for many decorative pieces, including a series of military figurines. At the beginning of the 20th century, the artist Jorge Colaço collaborated with the company to produce azulejo tiles for several of his most significant commissions, including the vestibule of the São Bento railway station in Porto (1903), the Buçaco Palace hotel (1907), and the Carlos Lopes Pavilion in Lisbon, which was originally constructed for the Independence Centenary International Exposition in Rio de Janeiro in 1922 and then rebuilt in Lisbon.

== The Museum ==
Designed around the centrepiece of Kiln 18 from the old factory, the museum provides a history of the factory as well as temporary exhibitions drawn from its own and some private collections. It covers the period from 1865 until the 1980s, with the museum’s total collection amounting to some 8,000 pieces. Items in the collection include domestic utensils, decorative utensils, sanitary ware, decorative plates and figurines, as well as the materials and equipment used in their manufacture such as molds, together with laboratory materials, machines, and original design drawings and pigments. In addition to the museum space itself, the museum has a documentation centre, named after the founder, Manuel Joaquim Afonso, which provides a documentation of Portugal’s industrial heritage and is available for use by researchers. There is also an auditorium named in honour of António Ferreira, an anti-fascist leader who worked at the factory, and a pottery workshop named after José de Sousa, a craftsman at the factory, together with a small shop

The kiln, which was originally constructed in the 1940s is an example of a bottle kiln, a type of kiln common in the Staffordshire Potteries in England until the 1960s. It has a diameter of 6 metres and is 12 metres high. Made of brick, it is reinforced externally by iron bands and has ten furnaces fuelled by wood or coal. Firing could last up to a week, much longer than more modern kilns. To avoid damage to the pieces by the gasses during firing they were placed inside saggars or ceramic containers. Visitors can go inside the kiln and imagine what it was like for the workers to be inside at high temperatures.

== See also ==
- History of Sacavém
