= Corrina =

Corrina is a given name. Notable people with the name include:

- Corrina Gould, Californian Native American activist
- Corrina Hewat (born 1970), Scottish harpist and composer
- Corrina Joseph, British singer who collaborated with Basement Jaxx
- Corrina Kennedy (born 1970), Canadian sprint kayaker
- Corrina Repp, vocalist, guitarist, songwriter, and maker of quiet music
- Corrina Sephora Mensoff (born 1971), American visual artist
- Corrina Wycoff, American writer

== See also ==
- Corinna, an Ancient Greek poet
- Corina
- Corrina, Corrina (film), a 1994 feature film
- "Corrine, Corrina", a country blues song
- Corina (disambiguation)
- Corinna (disambiguation)
- Corrine (disambiguation)
