= Korine =

Korine is a surname. Notable people with the surname include:

- Harmony Korine (born 1973), American film director, producer, screenwriter, writer and actor
- Rachel Korine (born 1986), American actress
- Raph Korine (born 1994), reality TV personality, runner-up of Big Brother 2017 UK, lived in Zurich, Switzerland

== See also ==
- Corine (disambiguation)
