= Corina Novelino =

Brazilian writer

Corina Novelino (August 12, 1912 – February 10, 1980) was a Brazilian philanthropist, writer, educator, medium, and Spiritist columnist.

== Life ==
Corina Novelino was born in Delfinópolis, Minas Gerais, to José Gonçalves Novelino and Josefina de Melo Novelino in 1912. Her family moved to nearby Sacramento when she was six years old, but Novelino and her four siblings were orphaned shortly thereafter. She was taken in by Edalides Milan de Rezende, the sister of the Brazilian Spiritist leader Eurípedes Barsanulfo, and her husband José Rezende da Cunha.

By age 20, Novelino had become heavily involved in the world of Spiritism, a philosophical and religious movement that became particularly popular in Brazil. She was invited by the prominent Spiritist Maria Modesto Cravo to help run a children's home in Uberaba, but she declined and chose to stay in Sacramento on the advice of Chico Xavier, another prominent Brazilian Spiritist who is credited with popularizing the religious movement in the country. Her charitable work in Sacramento included founding the Clube das Mãezinhas (Mommies' Club), a group of mothers who volunteered to make clothes for needy children.

In 1950, Novelino decided to found a home for abandoned children with a focus on Spiritist teaching, although she initially lacked the means to pursue this goal. However, a massive raffle was held in Sacramento to fundraise for her cause, and she was able to purchase a house, which she named the Eurípedes Home after the late Eurípedes Barsanulfo.

Novelino worked for many years as a teacher at the Colégio Allan Kardec and the Escola Coronel José Afonso de Almeida, but she also dedicated herself to the children's home, paying for its maintenance out of her own teaching salary and through sales of her books. As the number of children housed at the Eurípedes Home grew, it became necessary to construct a new, larger building. Again, supporters in Sacramento and neighboring areas raised funds, and a building was constructed that could house over 100 children, who received food and clothing as well as an intellectual and religious education. Novelino continued to largely fund the school herself for many years before it eventually became a public institution that educates both residential and non-residential students.

She also focused on continuing the work of Eurípedes Barsanulfo, who founded the Colégio Allan Kardec, one of the world's first Spiritist schools. In 1975, along with her cousin Tomás Novelino—himself a graduate of the Colégio Allan Kardec—she founded the Escola Eurípedes Barsanulfo in Sacramento, which remains a hub of Spiritist pedagogy in Brazil.

As a writer, Novelino contributed to various newspapers in Sacramento, including Tribuna, Estado do Triângulo, and Jornal de Sacramento. She also wrote for the Rio-based magazines Fon Fon and Jornal das Moças, as well as several Spiritist press organs, notably the Araras-based publication Anuário Espírita and the Portuguese magazine Estudos Psíquicos.

Novelino died in 1980 at the age of 67, in Sacramento. The former president of the Sacramento City Council, also a Colégio Allan Kardec graduate, said of the late religious and charitable leader:

"Here is the gratitude of an entire people who recognized that, through her humble and quiet work, she was 'Mother Corina' to all of us. ... She was Mother Corina to the poor, to the suffering, to orphans, to the mentally ill, to those in need, to those who were abandoned, to the miserables."

== Selected works ==
- Escuta, meu filho
- Eurípedes, o homem e a missão (1979), a biography produced ahead of the centennial of the birth of Eurípedes Barsanulfo
- A Grande Espera, a mediumistic novel set in the era of Jesus, supposedly dictated by Eurípedes Barsanulfo
