= Corinna (diatom) =

Corinna Temporal range: 83.6–72.1 Ma

Scientific classification
- Domain: Eukaryota
- Clade: Diaphoretickes
- Clade: SAR
- Clade: Stramenopiles
- Phylum: Gyrista
- Subphylum: Ochrophytina
- Class: Bacillariophyceae
- Order: incertae sedis
- Genus: †Corinna; P.A.C.Heiberg, 1863

Species
- †Corinna elegans Heiberg, 1863 (accepted as Hemiaulus elegans (P.A.C.Heiberg) Grunow, 1884)

Extinct genus of single-celled organisms

Corinna is an extinct genus of diatoms of uncertain placement within Bacillariophyceae (incertae sedis). C. elegans is from the Cretaceous of Canada.
