= Corina Dumitrescu =

Romanian politician

Corina Dumitrescu is a Romanian politician, member of the Social Democratic Party and since 2007 rector of Dimitrie Cantemir Christian University from Bucharest. She is also Advisory Board of the journal Cogito. She was nominated Education Minister in the Victor Ponta cabinet, but withdrew her candidacy after the media reported she plagiarized a law book, of Professor Octavian Manolache, that she co-authored with her husband, Cristian Dumitrescu, deputy and member of the Social Democratic Party.
