= Corinna Löckenhoff =

- Education: University of Marburg; Stanford University
- Scientific career
- Fields: Gerontology
- Workplaces: Cornell University; Weill Cornell Medicine
- Thesis: Age-Related Positivity Effects in Information Acquisition and Decision-Making: Testing Socioemotional Selectivity Theory in the Health Domain (2004)
- Doctoral advisor: Laura L. Carstensen

Corinna Elisabeth Löckenhoff (also spelled Loeckenhoff) is a gerontologist. She is a professor of Human Development at Cornell University and of Gerontology in Medicine at Weill Cornell Medicine.

== Education ==
Löckenhoff earned her undergraduate degree from the University of Marburg. She went on to receive her PhD in psychology from Stanford University in 2004. Her doctoral advisor was Laura L. Carstensen, and her thesis title was Age-Related Positivity Effects in Information Acquisition and Decision-Making: Testing Socioemotional Selectivity Theory in the Health Domain. After her PhD, she had a postdoctoral fellowship at the National Institute on Aging.

== Career ==
Löckenhoff has been a faculty member at Cornell University and Weill Cornell Medical since 2009. Her research focuses on how psychological factors vary with age and what these variations imply for mental and physical health. She investigates age differences in decision making, and in 2015 she co-edited a book on this topic, Aging and Decision Making, with Thomas M. Hess and JoNell Strough. She also studies the influence of personality and emotion upon health behaviors and outcomes, a line of inquiry exemplified in a 2016 book that she co-edited with Anthony Ong, Emotion, Aging, and Health.

== Awards and honors ==
The Association for Psychological Science recognized Löckenhoff as a Rising Star in 2011, and she received the Margret M. and Paul B. Baltes Foundation Award in Behavioral and Social Gerontology from the Gerontological Society of America in 2014. She was elected fellow of the Gerontological Society of America in 2016 and the Association for Psychological Science in 2020.
