= Corina Freire =

Portuguese singer and actor

- Born: Corina Carlos Freire; 14 December 1897; Silves, Portugal
- Died: 5 October 1986 (aged 88); Lisbon, Lisboa Municipality, Lisboa, Portugal
- Resting place: Prazeres Cemetery, Estrela, Lisboa Municipality, Lisboa, Portugal
- Occupations: Singer and actor
- Years active: 20
- Notable work: As Giestas
- Partner: Ana de Gonta Colaço
- Children: None

Corina Freire (1897 – 1986), was a Portuguese singer, actress and impresario.

== Early life ==
Corina Carlos Freire was born on 14 December 1897 in Silves in the Algarve region of Portugal. She was the illegitimate daughter of João José Freire, a pharmacy owner, and Bazília Nunes de Sousa. She was legitimized by her parents' marriage, which took place on 19 August 1905 in the Portuguese capital, Lisbon. She grew up in an affluent family, which had a taste for the arts, allowing her to develop singing and musical skills from an early age. She, her five brothers and her father formed a chamber music group, in which she played the piano and her father the violin. Some of her brothers went on to have musical careers.

== Career ==
After a brief marriage at the age of 17 in Portimão, causing Freire to briefly suspend her musical life, she moved from the Algarve to Lisbon in 1921, where she worked as a pianist and singer at Valentim de Carvalho, a leading music publishing company. She played in the company's shop, often playing music for amateur musicians who had initial difficulty in reading the score. She then began to receive invitations for recitals, singing opera songs and lied in several concerts and recitals, including with the pianist José Vianna da Motta. In 1927, she debuted in the popular theatre, performing in a "magazine" (vaudeville) show called Roses from Portugal in the Cineteatro Éden. The theme song from the show, As Giestas, made her famous. She continued to perform in this genre, moving to the Teatro Avenida, while also attending the National Conservatory of Lisbon.

With the coming of sound film, or talking pictures, American companies were worried about losing the market outside English-speaking countries for films not in local languages. Freire was invited to Paris to record Paramount Pictures films in Portuguese, including Cradle Song and The Laughing Lady. In 1931, she became a theatrical impresario, in partnership with António Macedo, producing several magazine shows that featured her and Beatriz Costa. She returned to Paris in 1934, together with dancers Francis Graça and Ruth Walden, for a show to promote popular Portuguese songs and dances. In 1935, she won a competition in Paris, Le Plus Beau Sourire de Paris (The most beautiful smile in Paris). On the strength of this, she was auditioned by the Casino de Paris, one of the city's major music halls, and performed with one of France's biggest stars, Maurice Chevalier.

Freire maintained a lesbian relationship with the sculptor Ana de Gonta Colaço. This had a negative effect on Colaço's output as she produced nothing while she was with Freire. While they were together in Paris, the pair travelled to London in March 1934 as Freire had been hired to give a recital at the Portuguese Embassy. The recital was attended by Winston Churchill and the then Prince of Wales, later Edward VIII and Duke of Windsor.

Back in Portugal in June 1936, after she and Colaço had experienced financial problems in Paris, Freire had trouble in achieving the same success as before. For a time, she concentrated on acting, rather than variety performances. She had a short working visit to Tangier, joined by Colaço, and later went to Brazil for six months to give solo performances. Returning to Portugal, she toured the country, but again had difficulty in attracting audiences. After 1940, she concentrated on giving singing lessons, although she did return to Brazil in 1947 to act on radio and television. Her singing students included a relative, António Calvário, Marco Paulo and Tonicha, who all became popular Portuguese singers. Freire also composed popular marches.

Corina Freire died in Lisbon on 5 October 1986. Her name is given to a street in Faro in the Algarve.
