= Corinne, West Virginia =

Community in West Virginia, US

Corinne
- Census-designated place (CDP)
- Location within the state of West Virginia
- Coordinates: 37°34′36″N 81°21′14″W
- Country: United States
- State: West Virginia
- County: Wyoming
- Incorporated: 1921

Area
  - Total: 0.395 sq mi (1.02 km^{2})
  - Land: 0.369 sq mi (0.96 km^{2})
  - Water: 0.026 sq mi (0.067 km^{2})

Population (2020)
  - Total: 318
  - Density: 862/sq mi (333/km^{2})
- Time zone: UTC-5 (Eastern (EST))
  - Summer (DST): UTC-4 (EDT)
- ZIP codes: 25826

Corinne is a census-designated place (CDP) in Wyoming County, West Virginia, United States.

Corinne was incorporated by the circuit court in 1921.

As of the 2020 census, Corinne's population was 318 (down from 362 at the 2010 census). It has a post office, established in 1916, with a zip code of 25826.
