= Jorge Colaço =

Portuguese artist (1868–1942)

Jorge Colaço GOSE
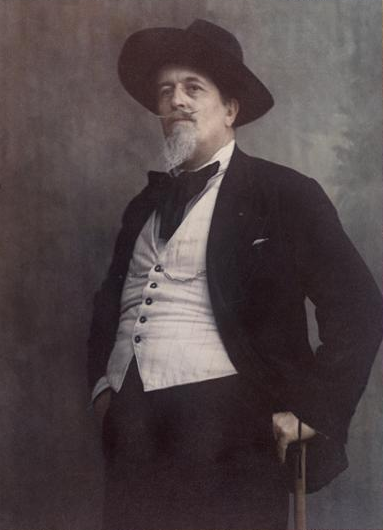
- Born: 26 February 1868; Tangier, Morocco
- Died: 23 August 1942 (aged 74); Oeiras, Portugal
- Known for: Painting
- Notable work: Media related to Jorge Colaço at Wikimedia Commons
- Movement: Romanticism

Jorge Colaço GOSE (26 February 1868 – 23 August 1942) was a Portuguese painter specially known for his works as tile (azulejo) painter.

Jorge Colaço was born in Tangier, Morocco, the son of a Portuguese diplomat. He studied art in Lisbon, Madrid and Paris.

Even though Jorge Colaço was a canvas painter and caricaturist, he specialised in designing and painting azulejo panels to decorate large surfaces. His designs had a late Romantic taste, celebrating the achievements of Portuguese history. Along with historical themes, he also produced ethnographic and landscape scenes.

Among his most important works are tile panels in the Palace Hotel of Bussaco (1907); São Bento railway station in Porto (1905–1916); Sports Pavilion of Edward VII Park in Lisbon (1922); façade of the Church of Saint Ildefonso in Porto (1932) and many others. He also has works in Brazil, England (Windsor Castle), Geneva (Centre William Rappard) and other countries.

== Gallery ==
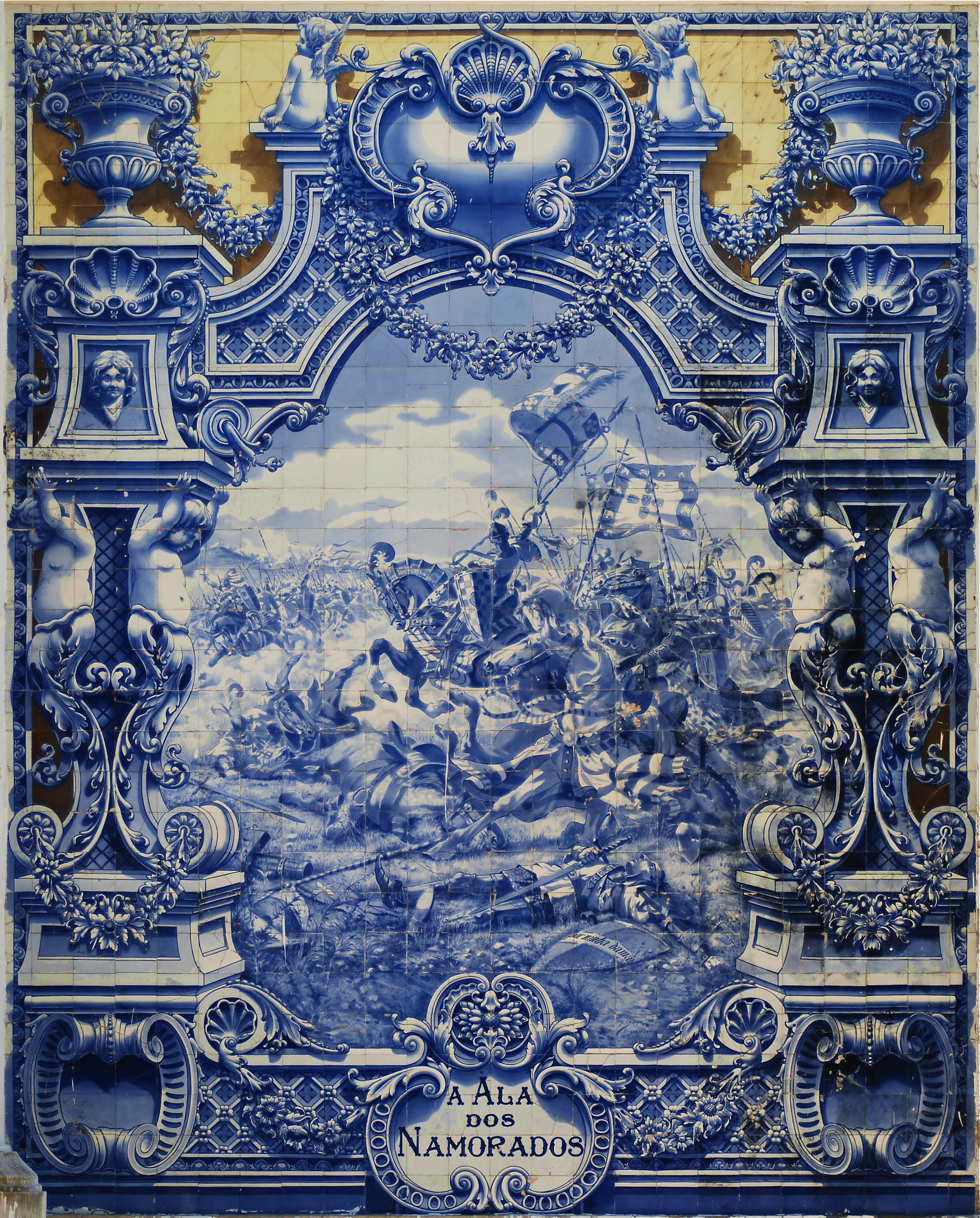
Tile panel (1922) in the Edward VII Park in Lisbon.

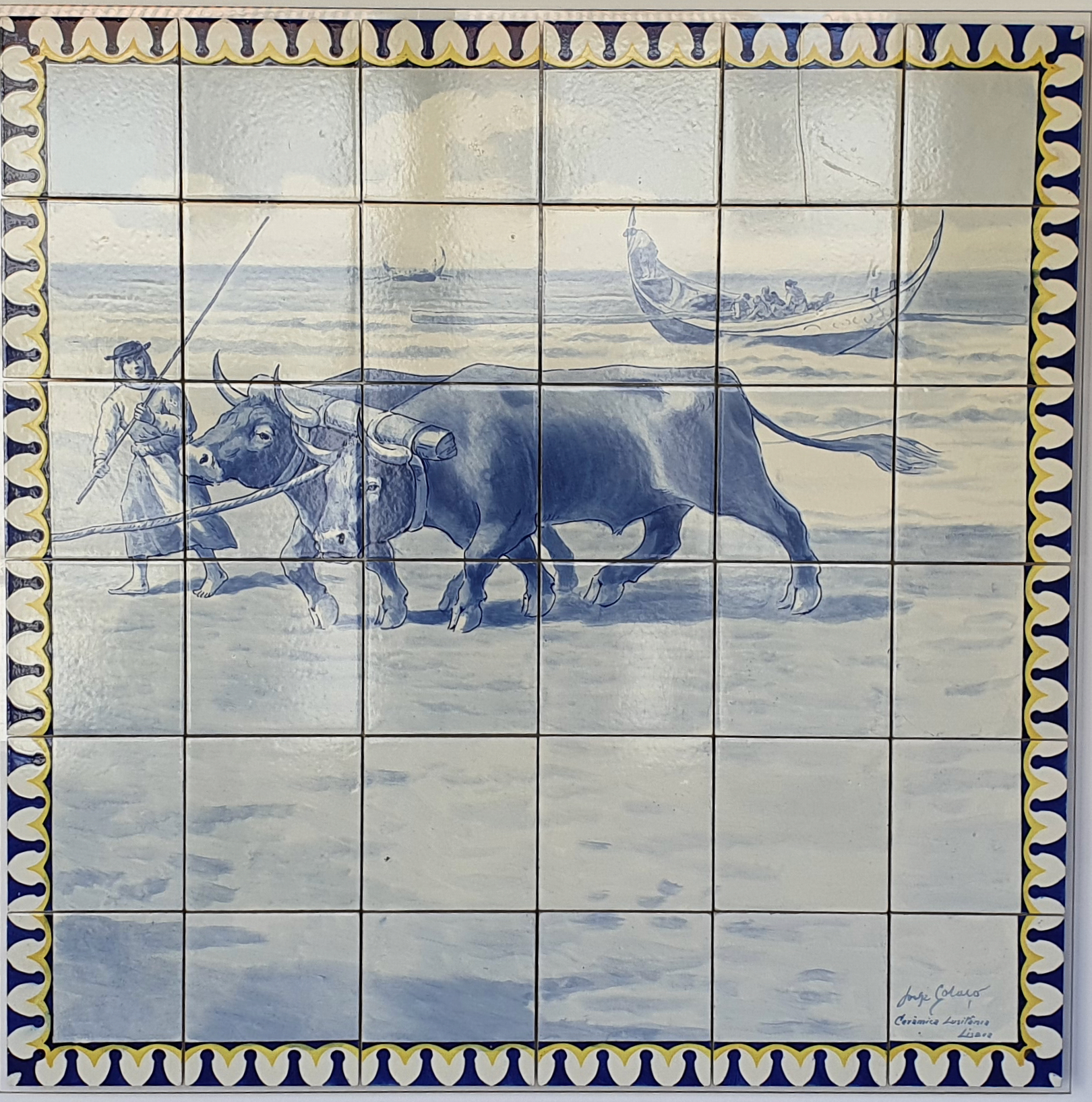
"Working on the Beach", at National Museum of the Azulejo.

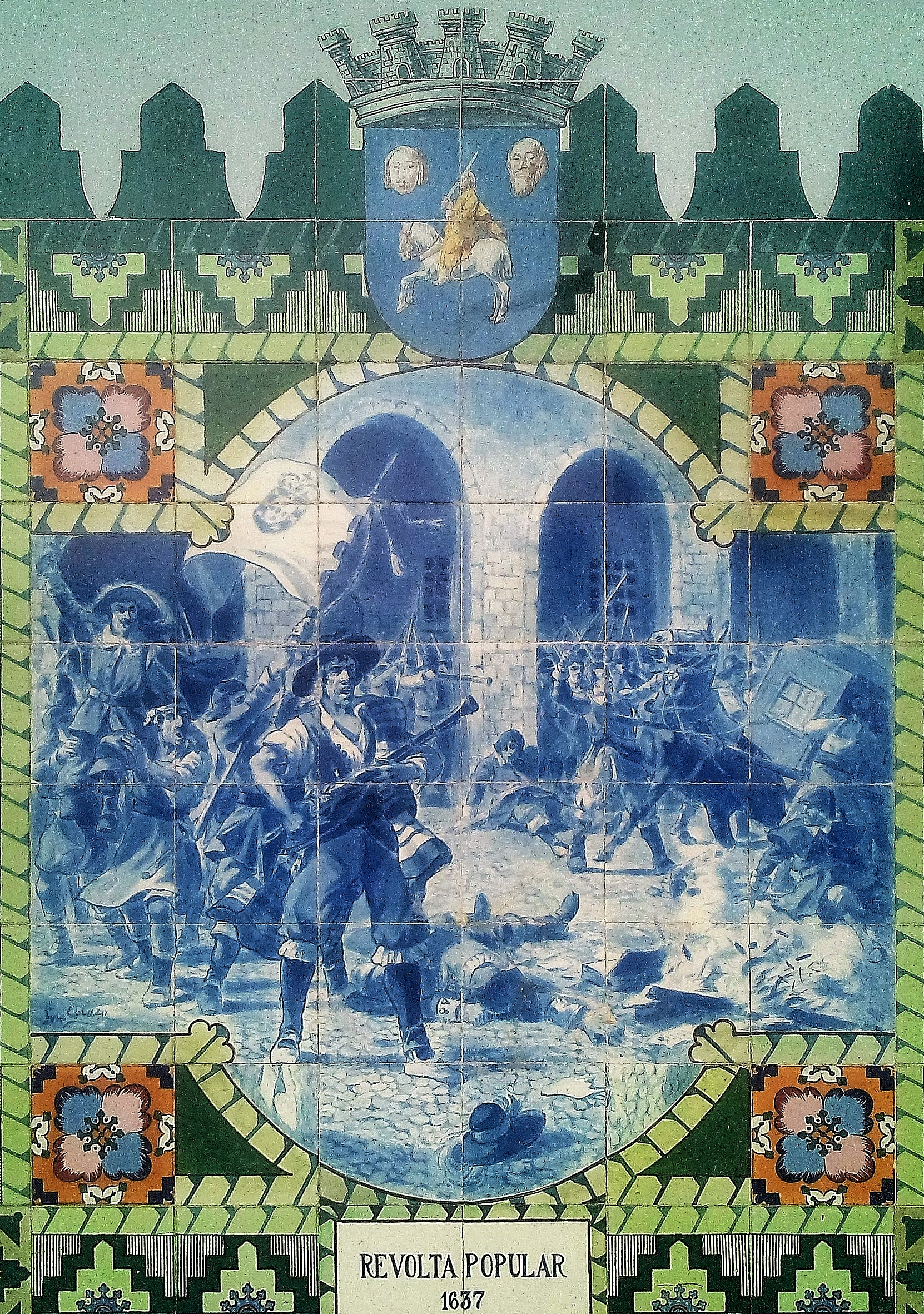
"Popular Revolt, 1637" at Évora Train Station.

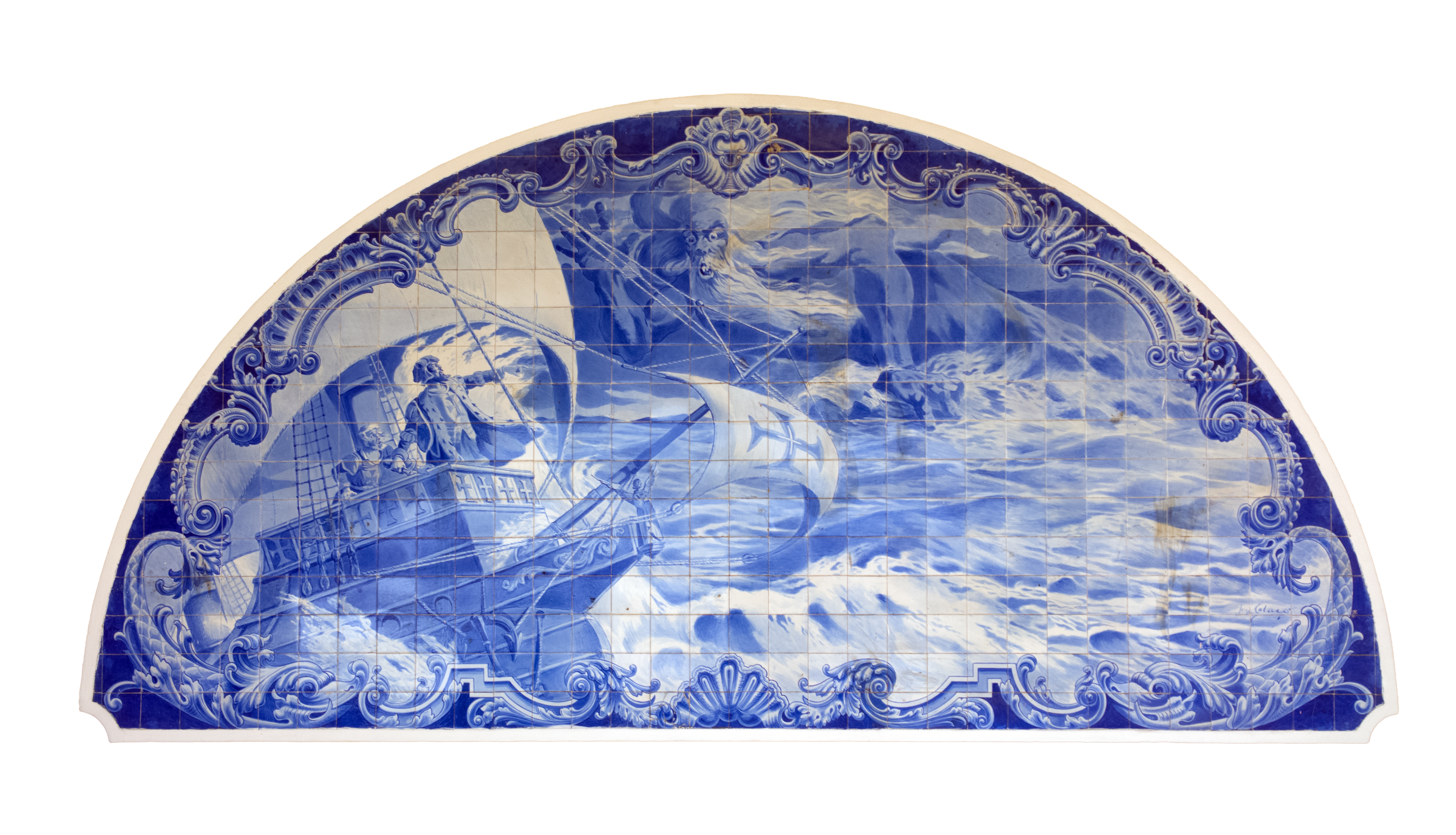
Tile panel at Vasco da Gama stadium in Rio de Janeiro.

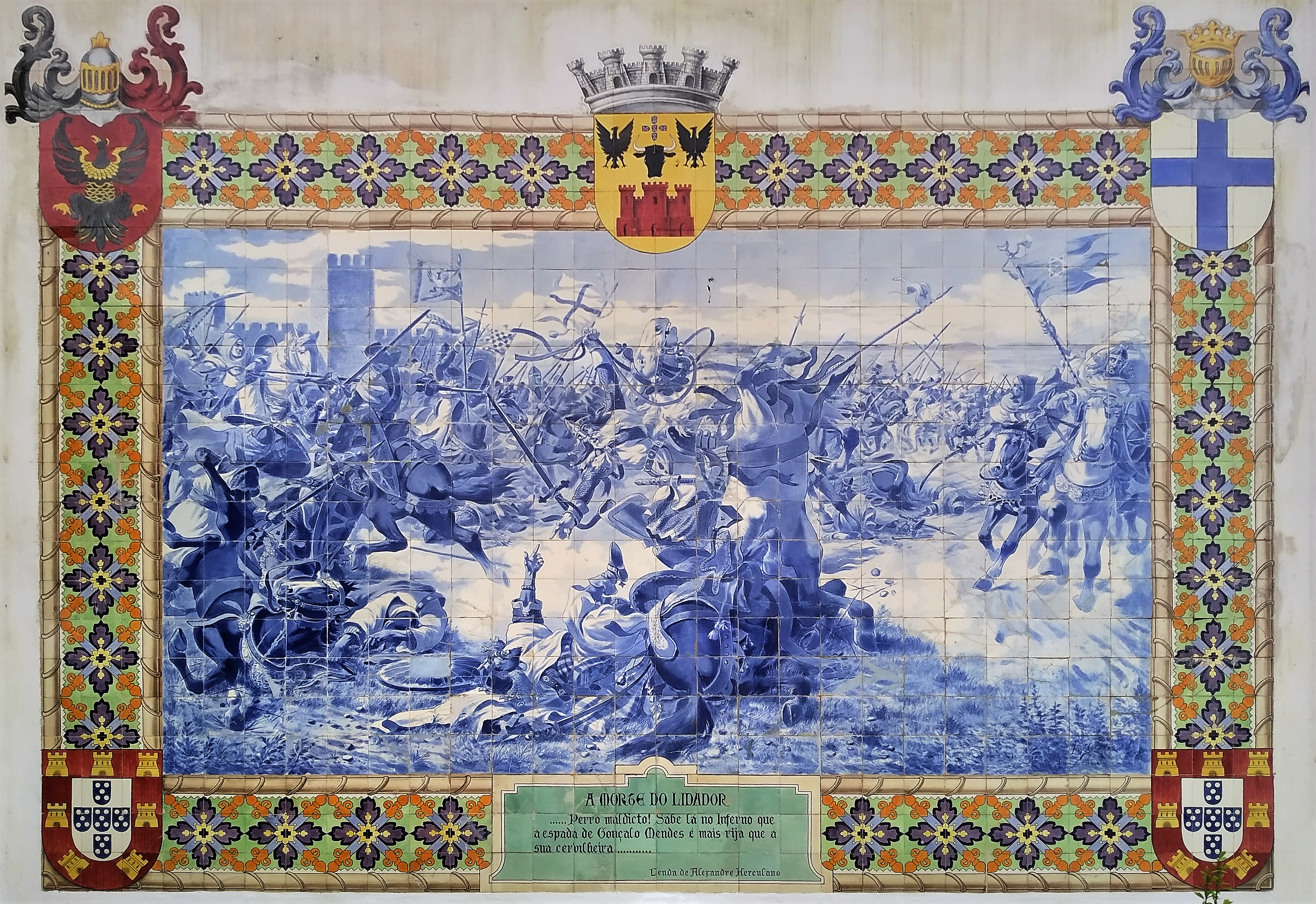
"The Death of The Lidador" (1940) in the Beja Public Park, Beja, Portugal.

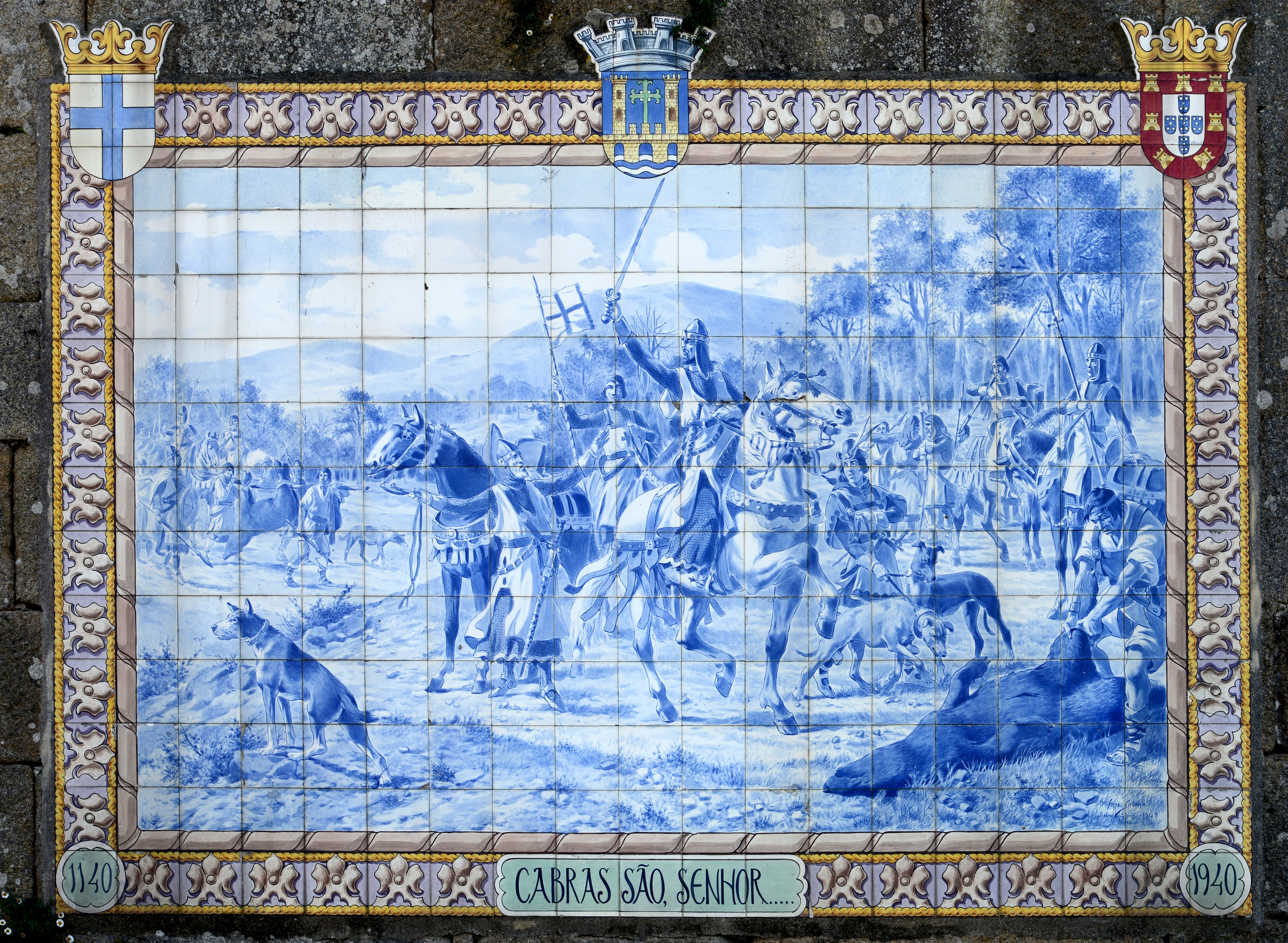
"They're Goats, Sire", monument in Ponte de Lima, Portugal.

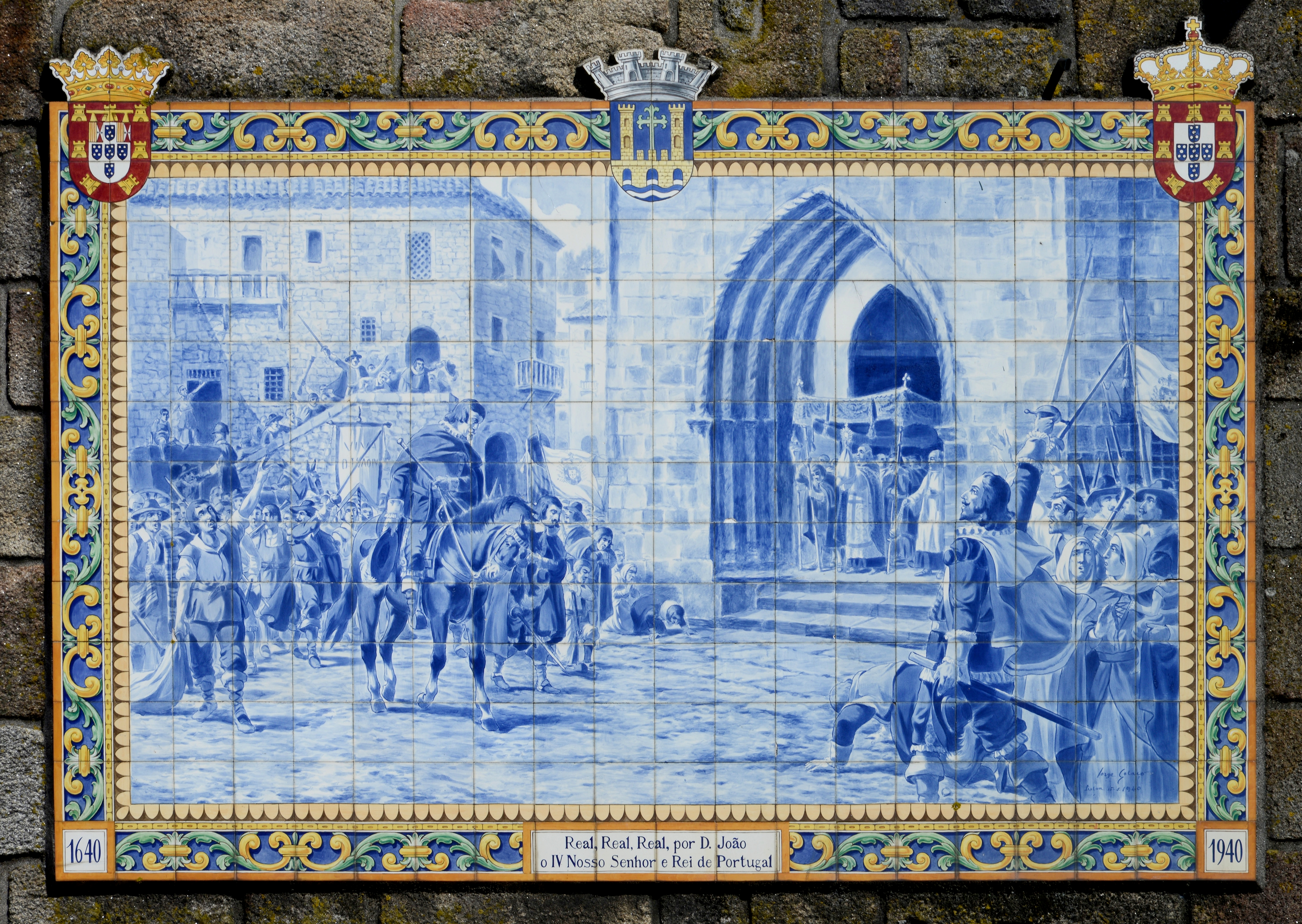
Representing the acclamation of King John IV of Portugal, in 1640, Ponte de Lima, Portugal 1940.

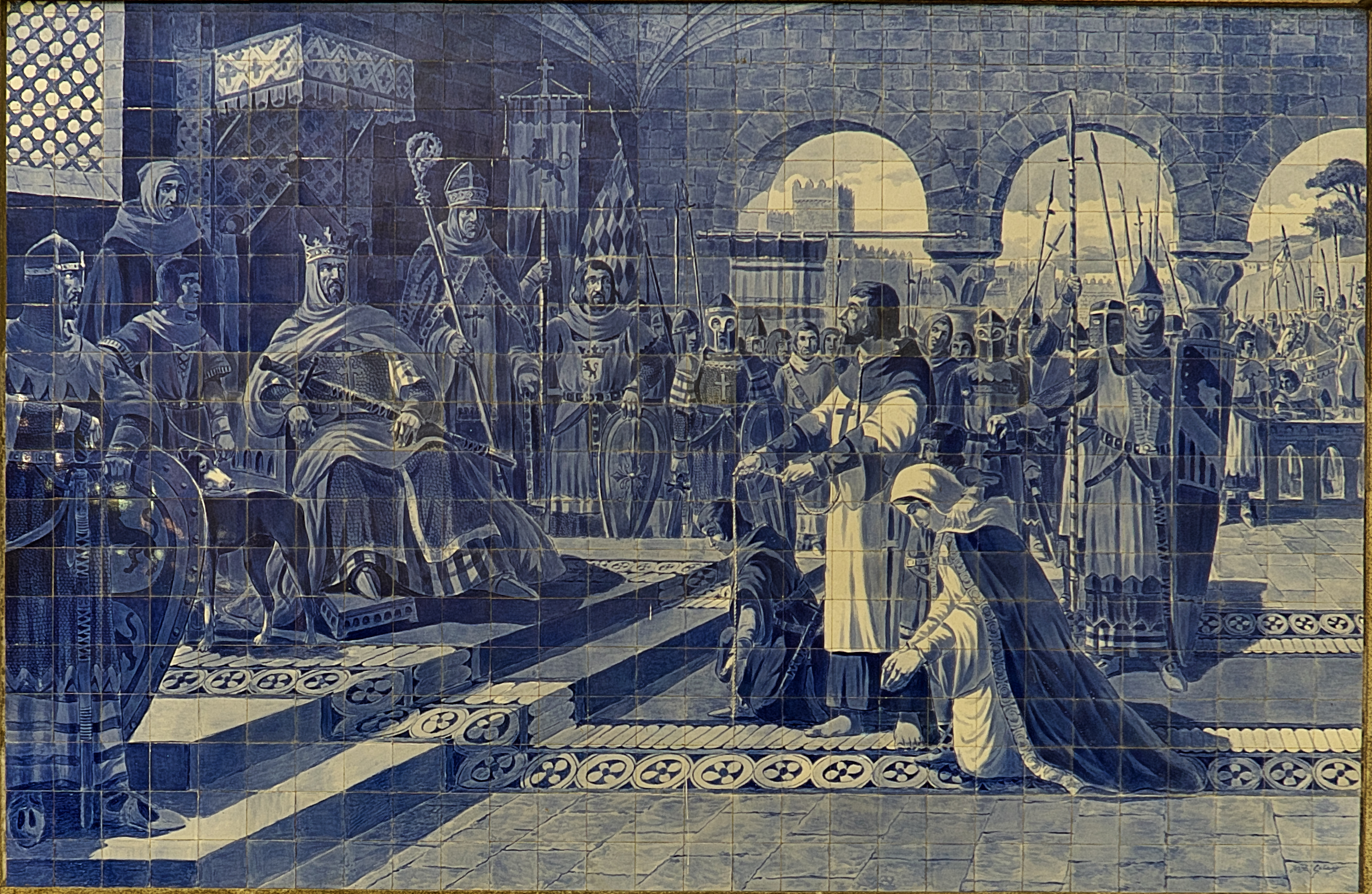
Egas Moniz and his Family Before King Alfonso VII of Leon, 1903, at the São Bento Train Station in Porto.

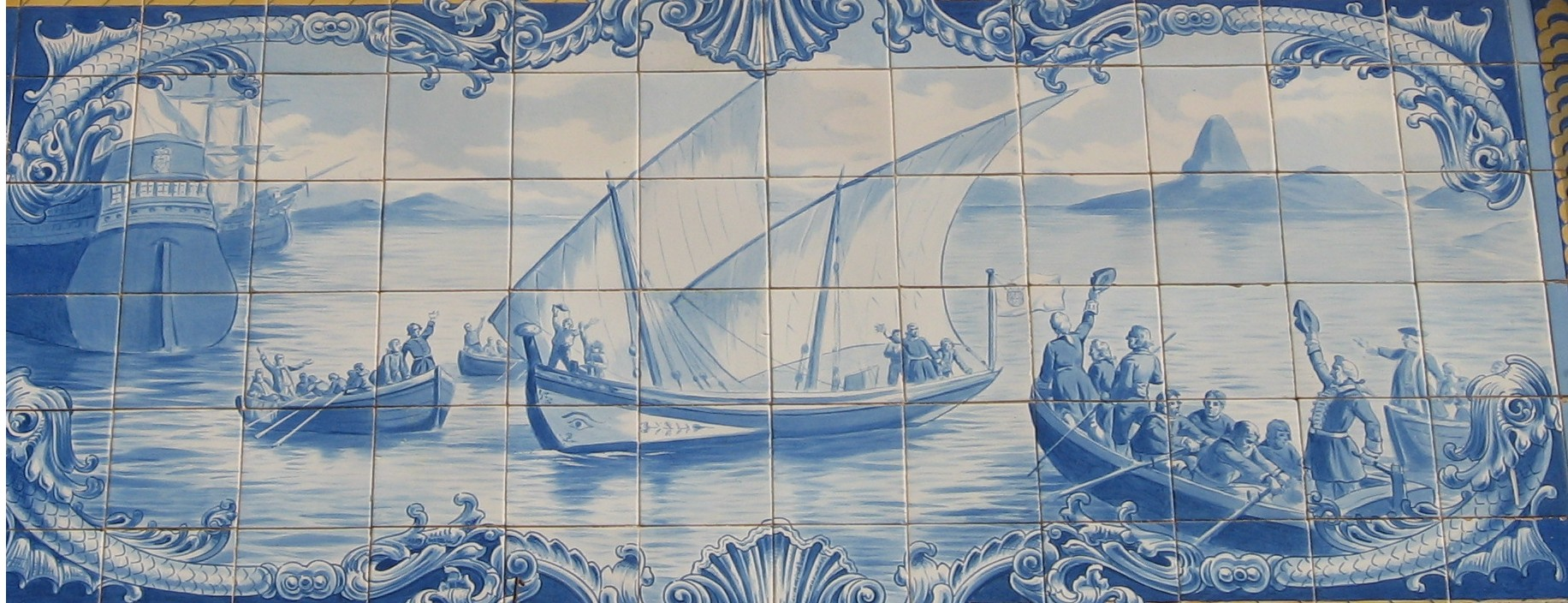
Arrival of the Caique Bom Sucesso in Brazil.

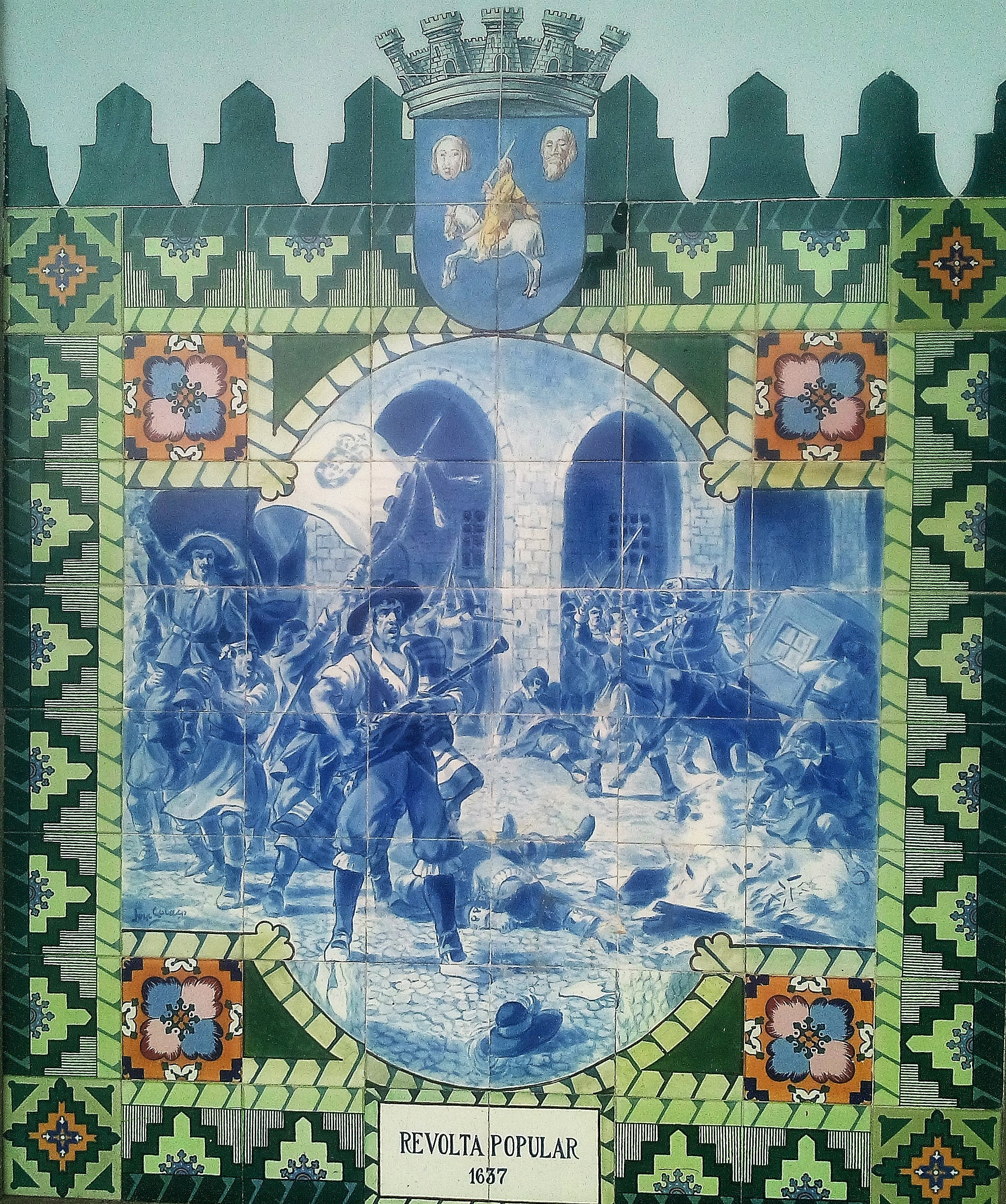
Manuelinho revolt- azulejo by Jorge Colaço at Évora railway station

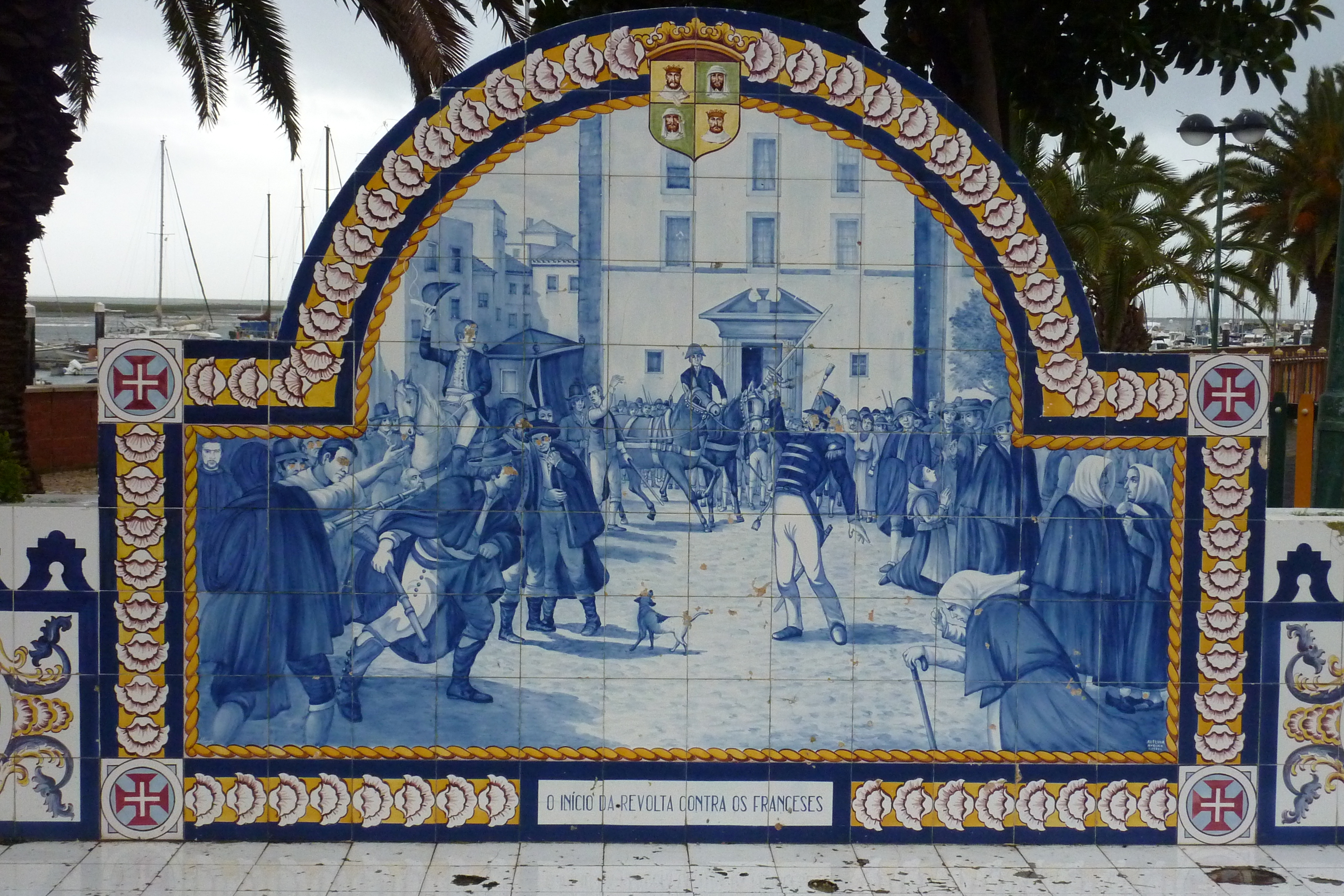
Revolt against the French, public monument in Olhão.

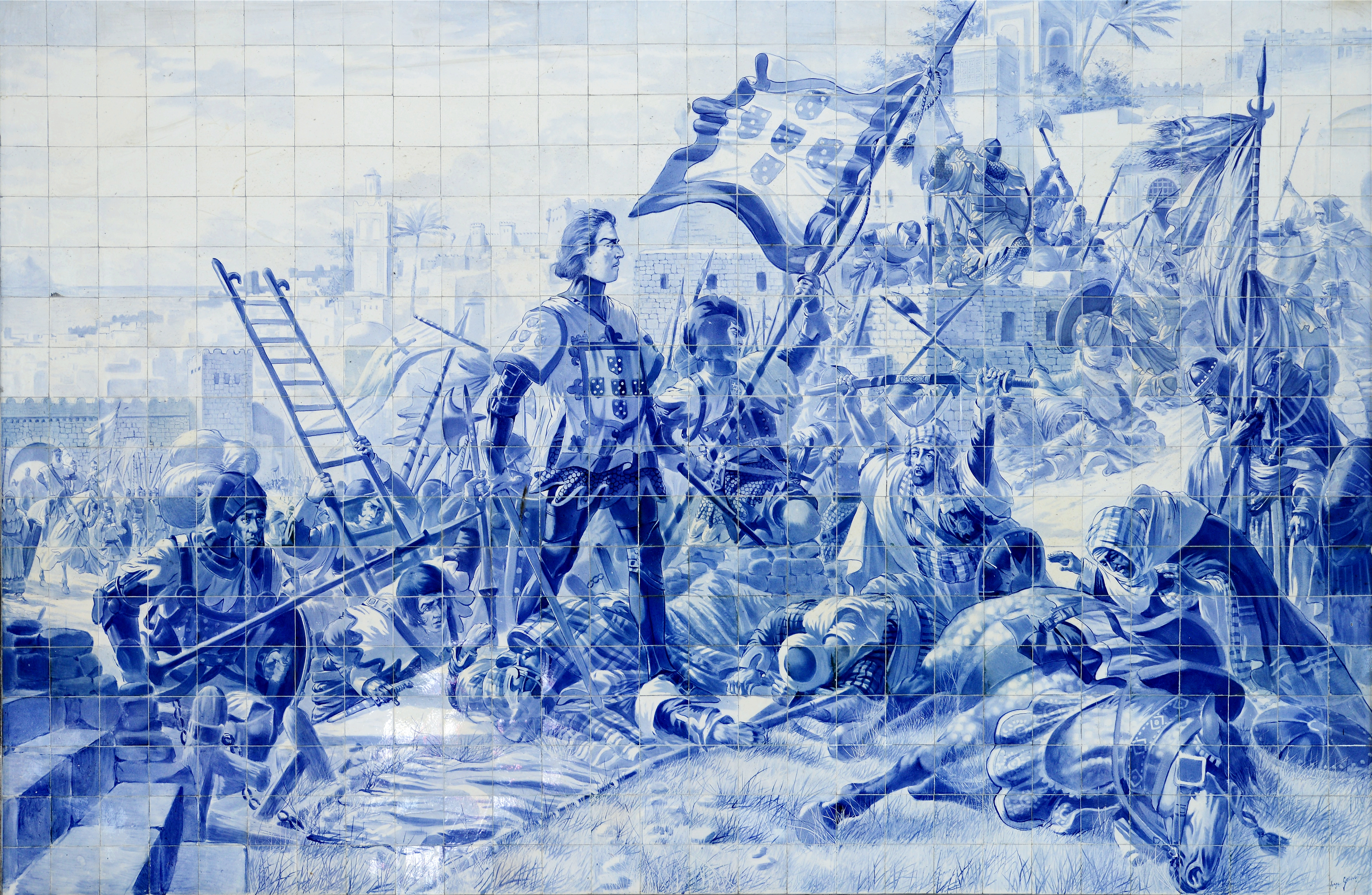
Conquest of Ceuta

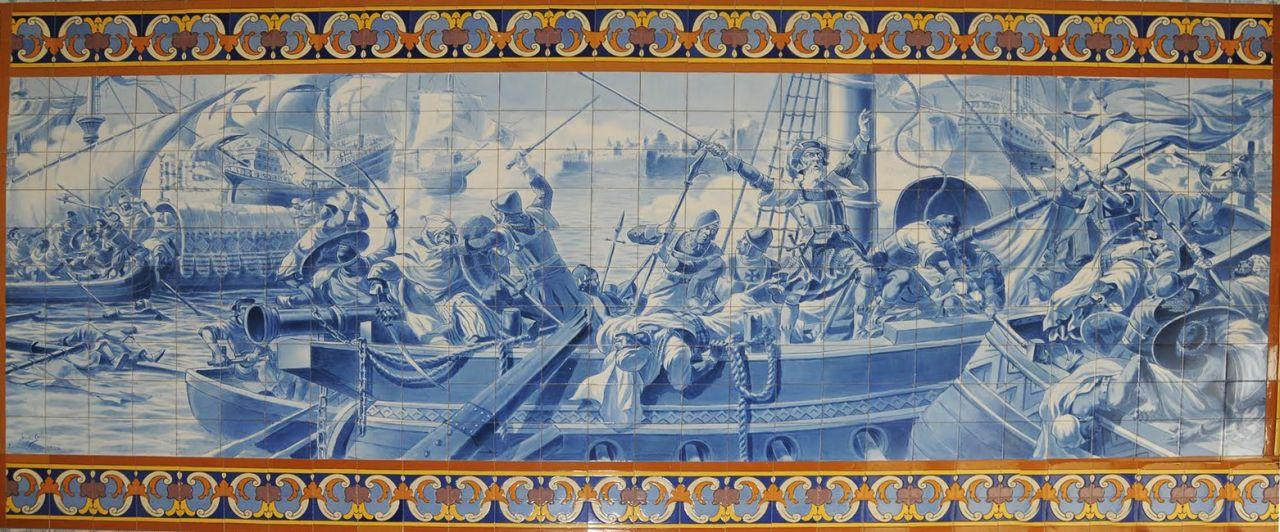
"Afonso de Albuequerque in the Taking of Hormuz", 1933, Centro Cultural Rodrigues de Faria, Forjães.

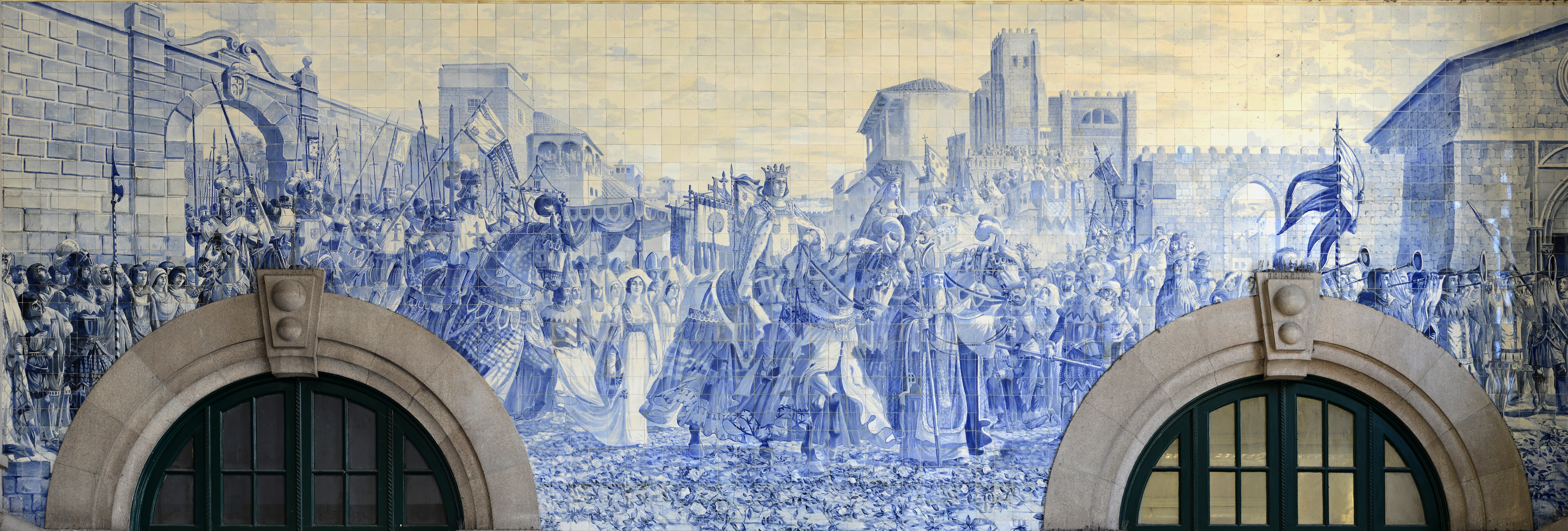
The entry of King João I of Portugal in Porto, after his marriage with Philippa of Lancaster.

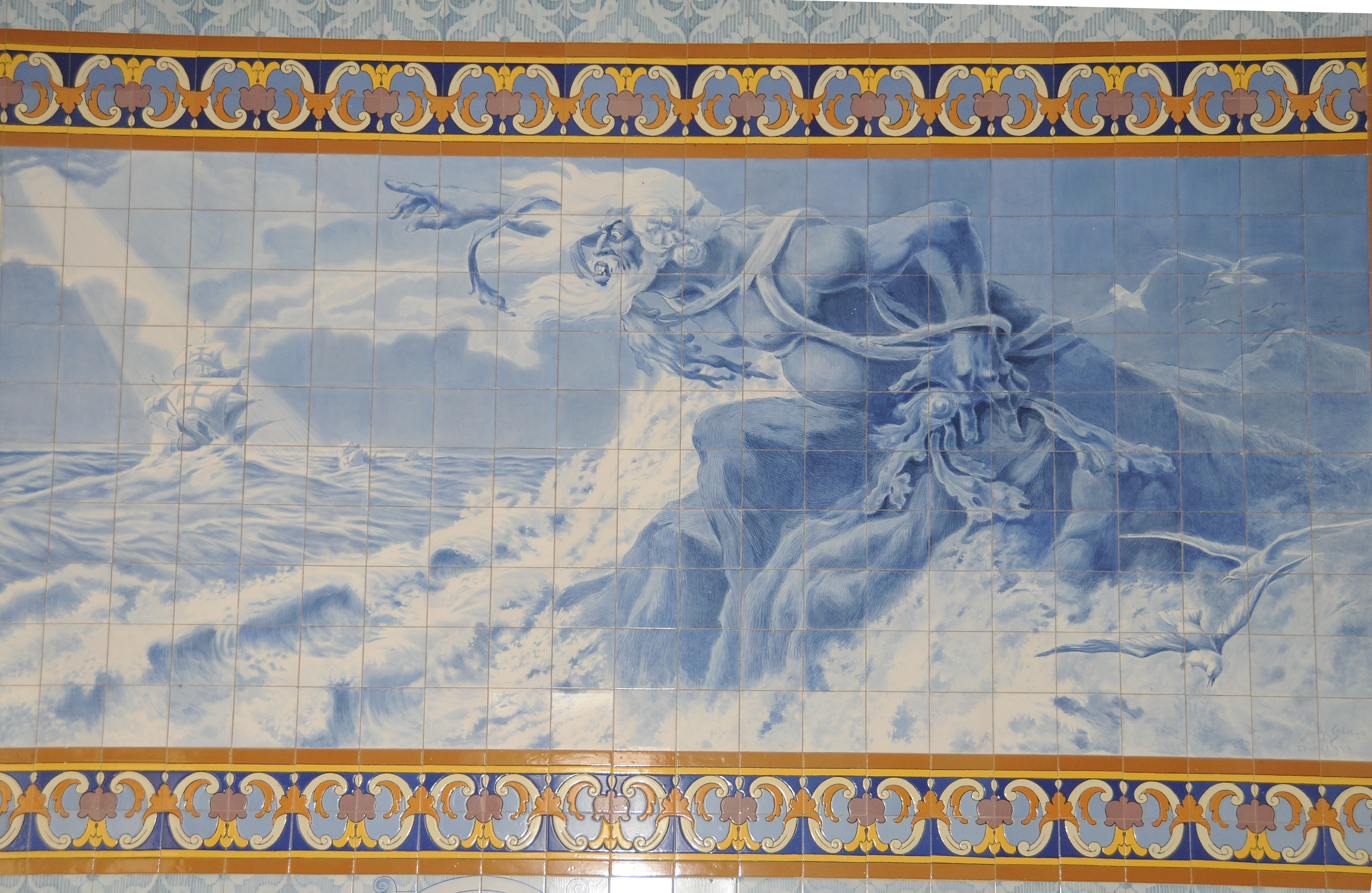
Azulejos depicting the Adamastor, in Centro Cultural Rodrigues de Faria, Forjães, Esposende, Portugal, from Jorge Colaço

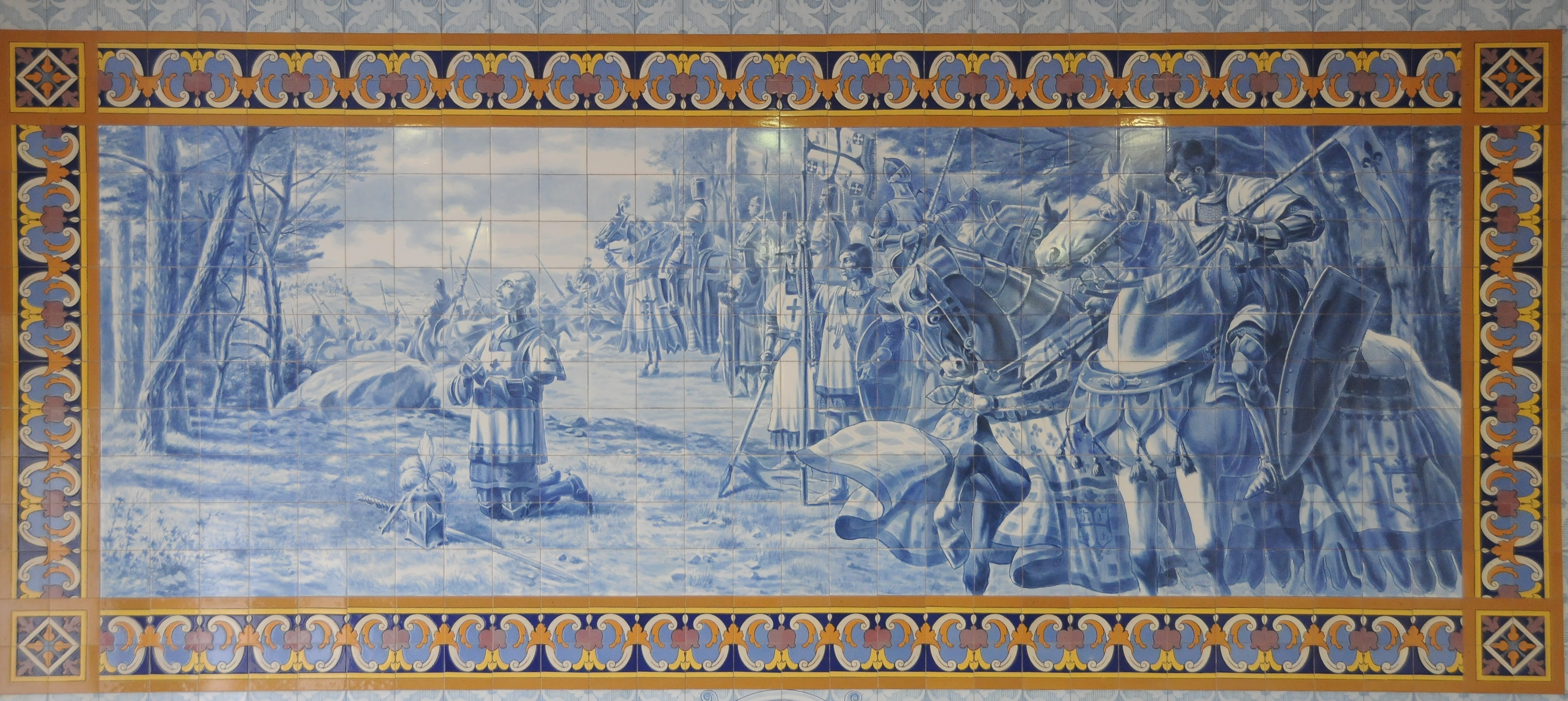
"Nuno Álvares Pereira at the Battle of Aljubarrota", in Centro Cultural Rodrigues de Faria, Forjães

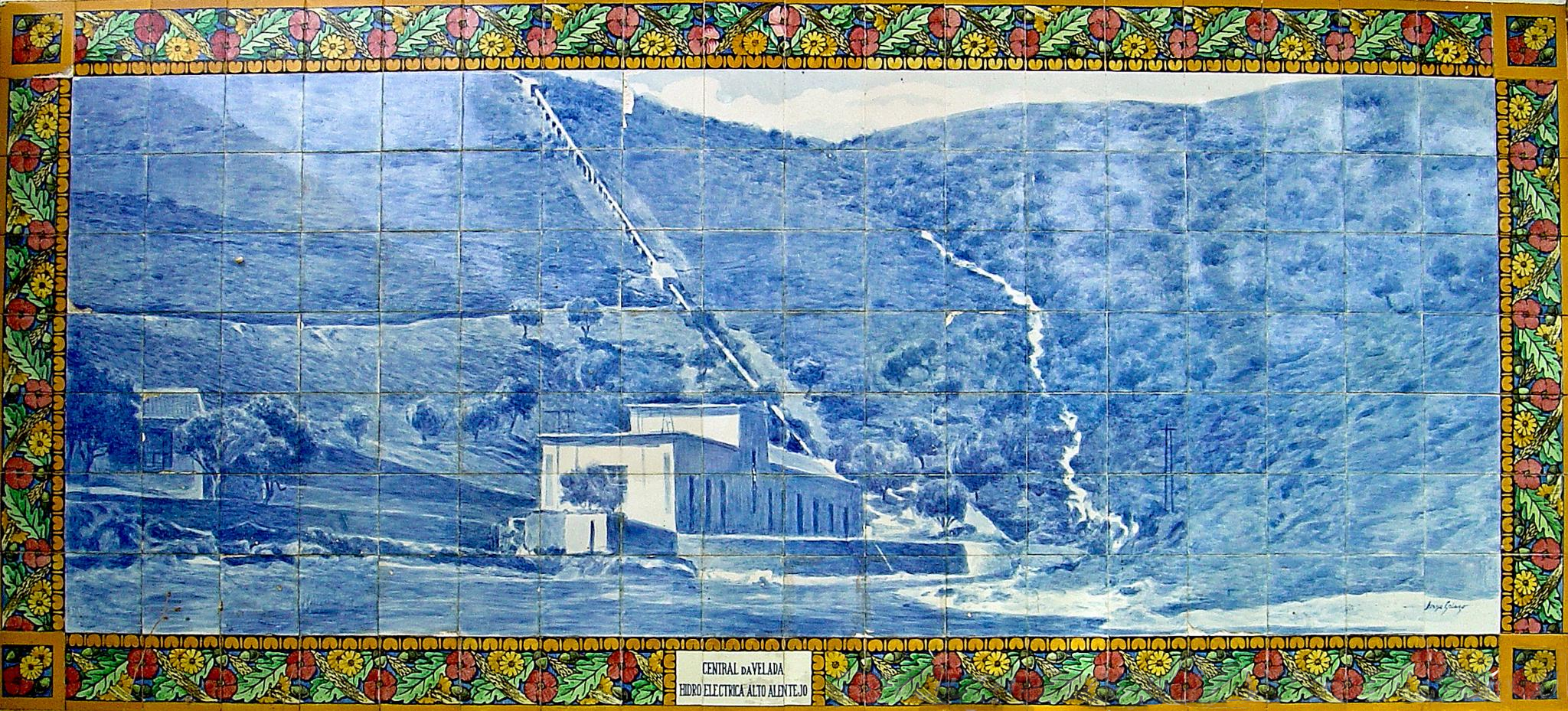
"Velada Hidroelectric Station" at the Vale do Peso Train Station.

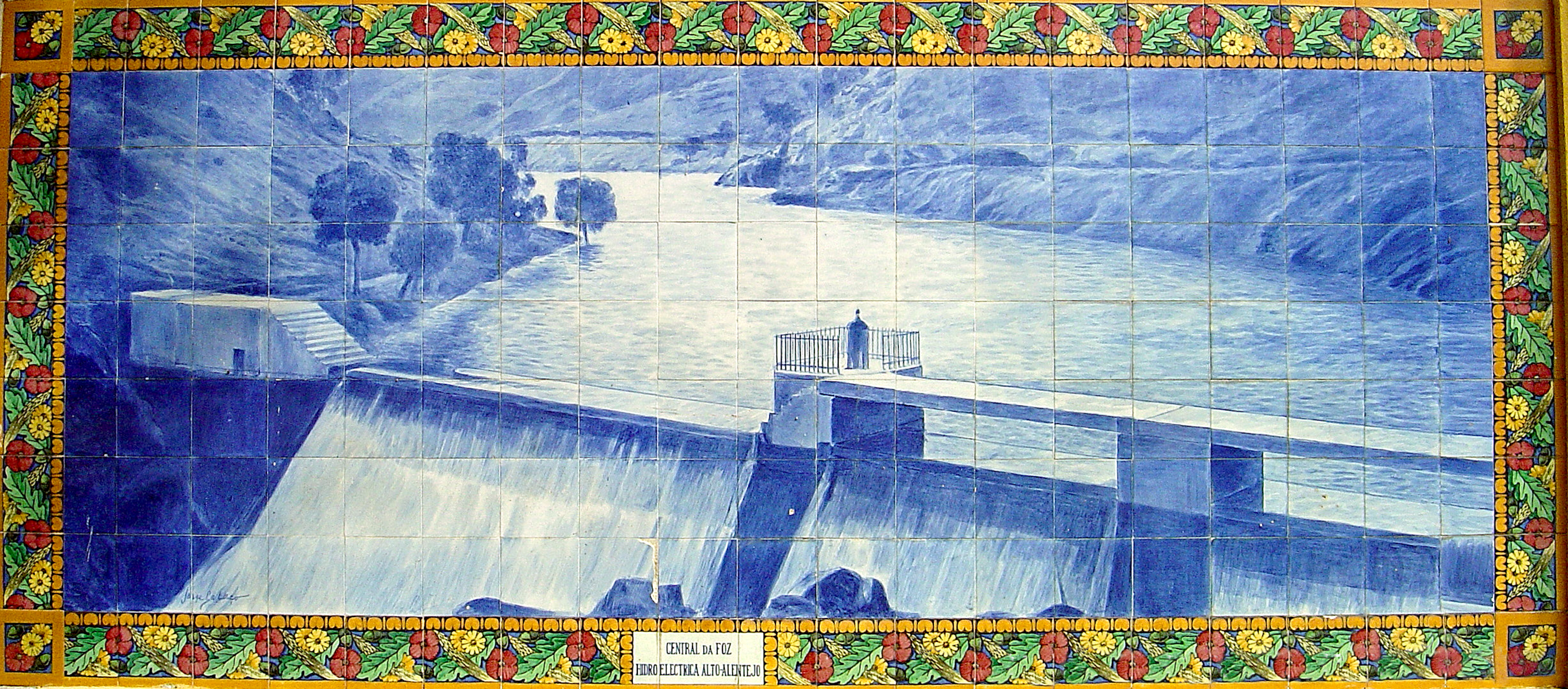
"Foz Station" at the Vale do Peso Train Station

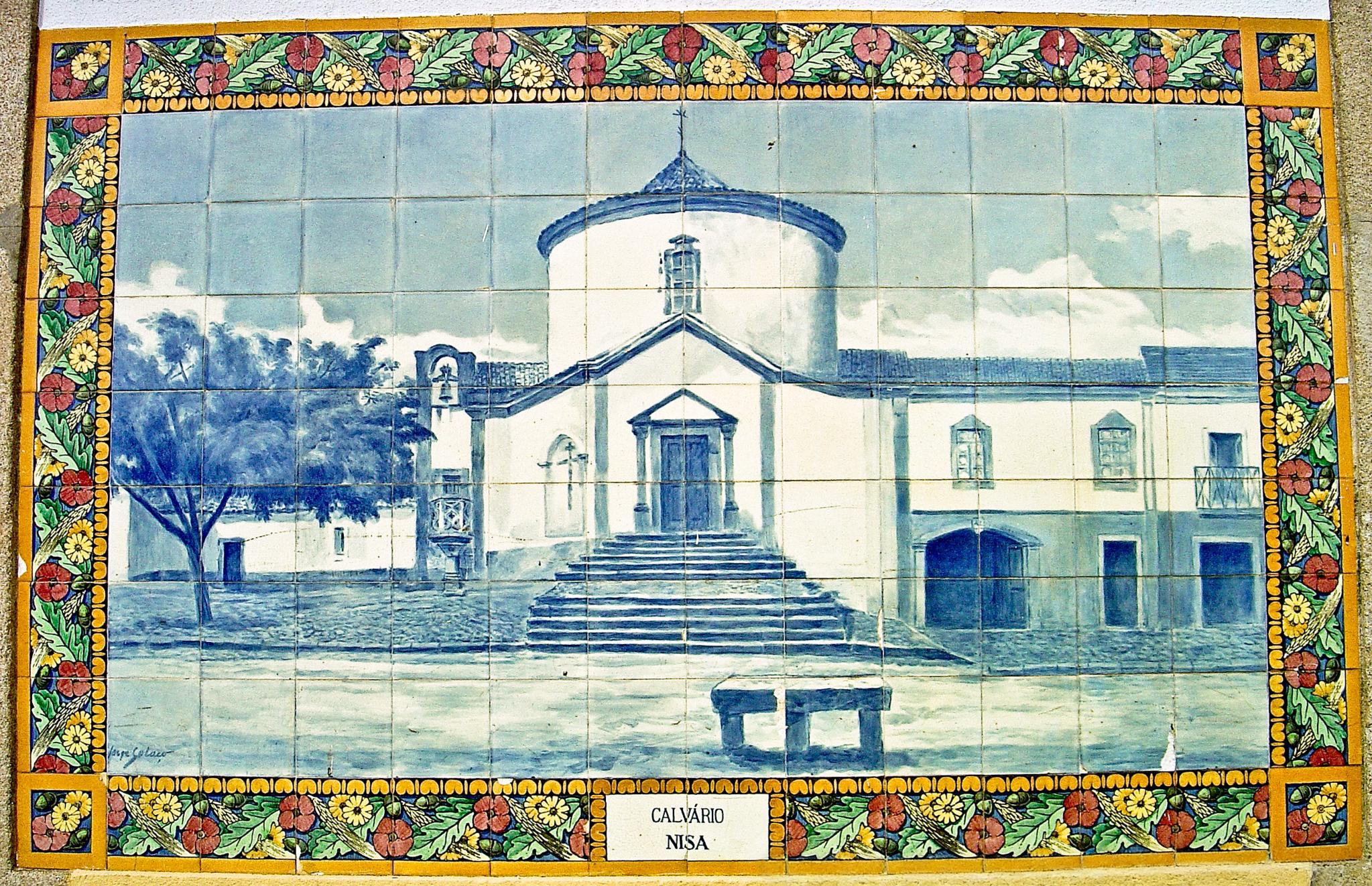
"Calvário, Nisa" at the Vale do Peso Train Station

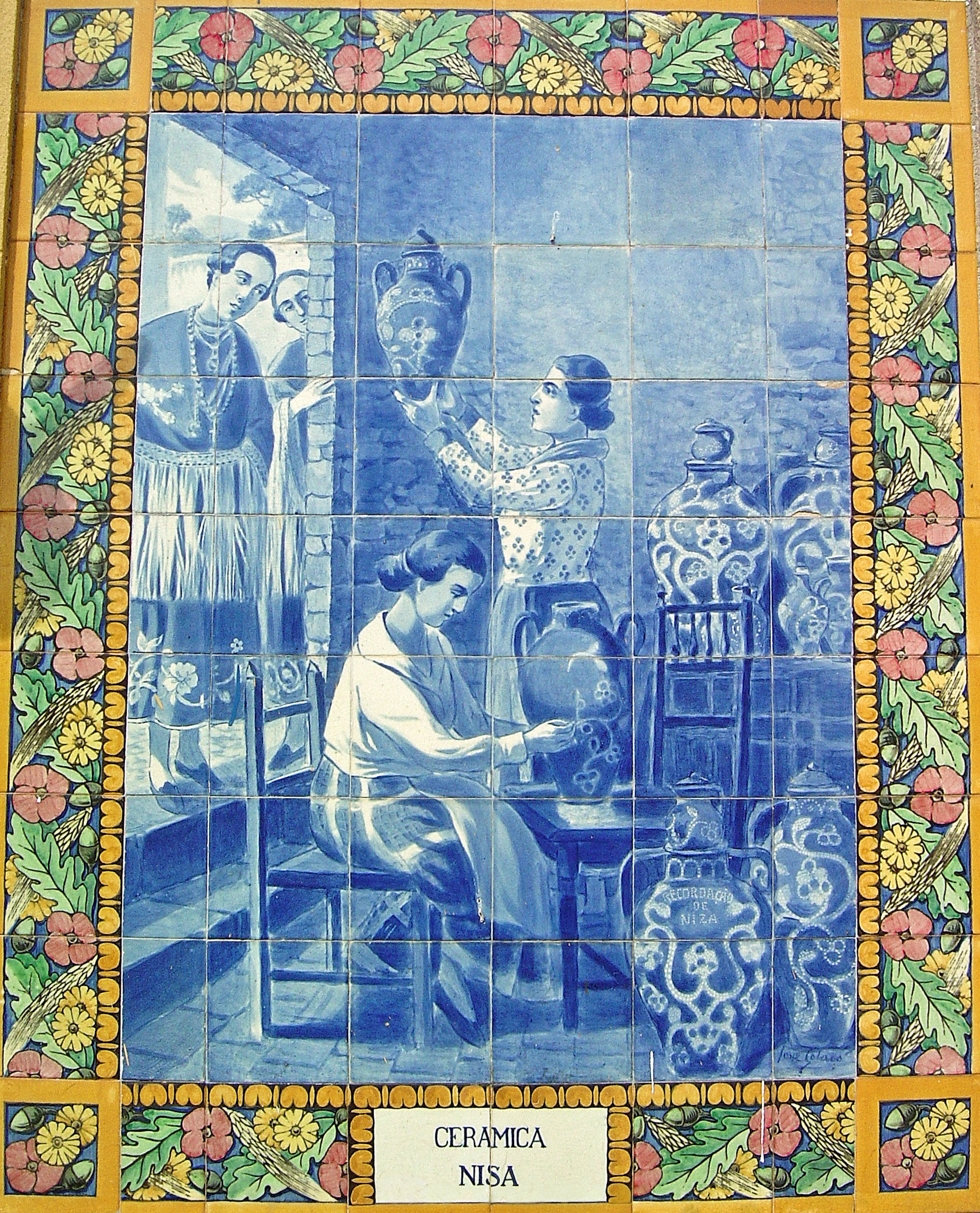
"Ceramics, Nisa" at the Vale do Peso Train Station

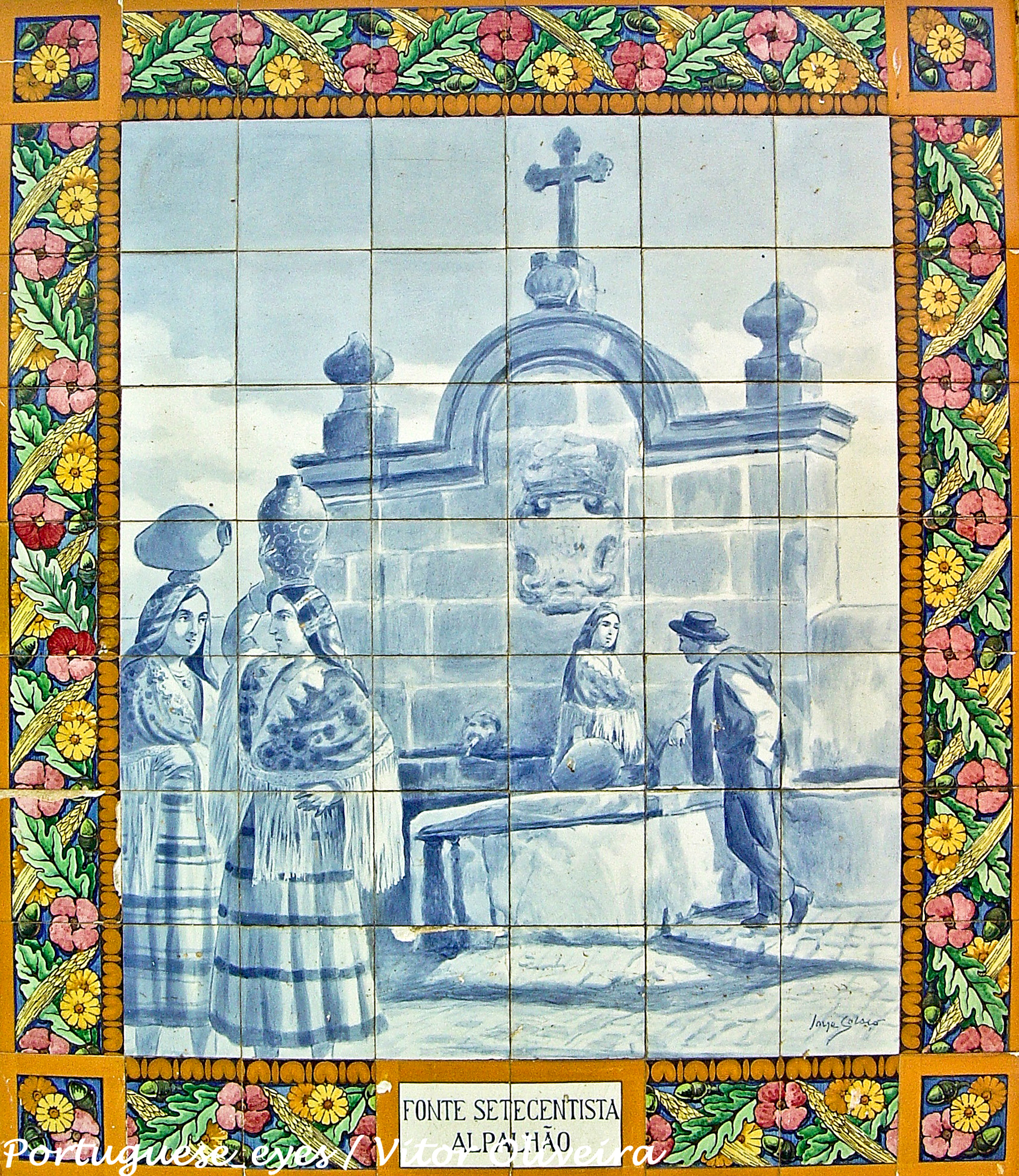
"18th century Fountain" at the Vale do Peso Train Station

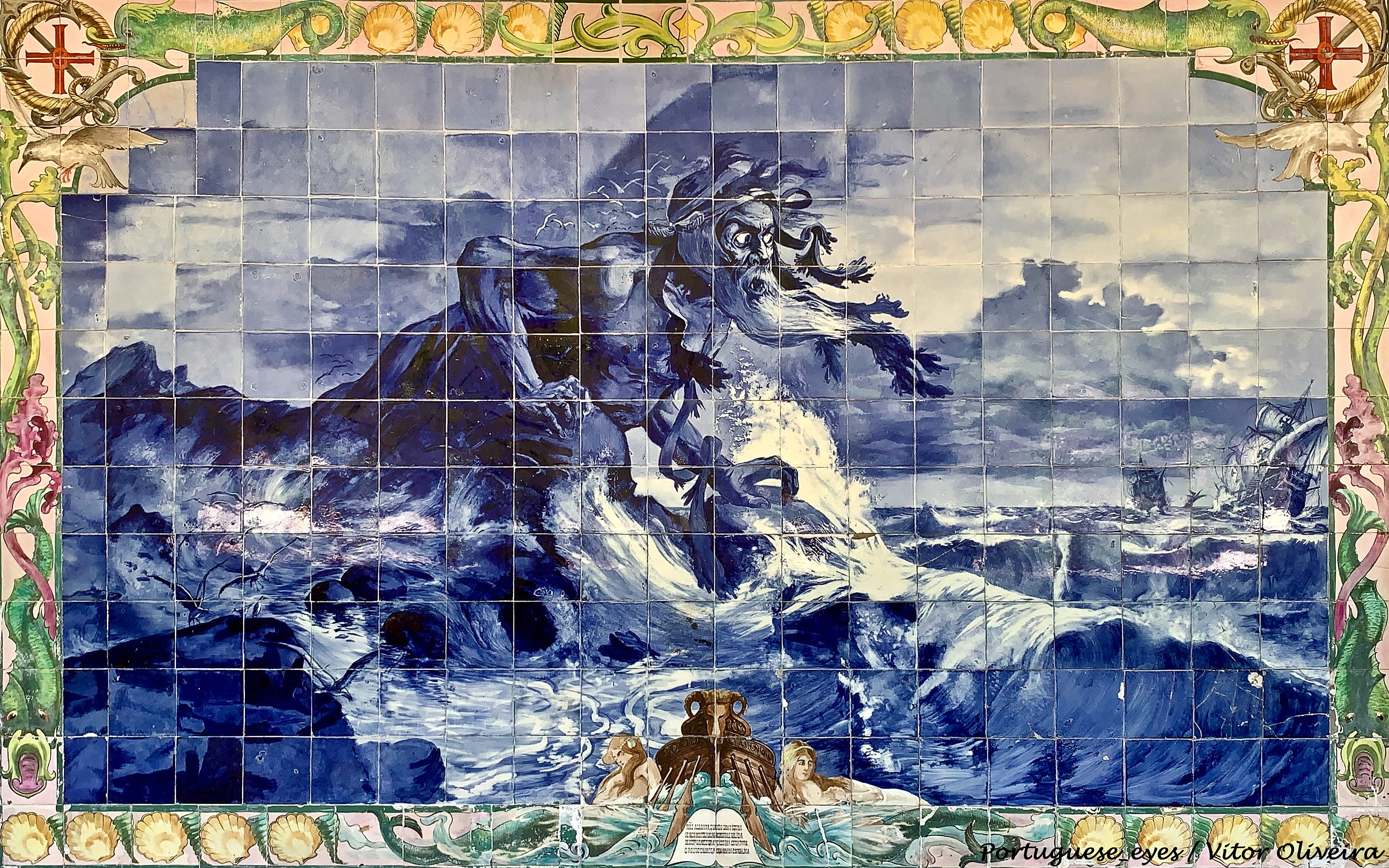
Adamastor, at Palace Hotel Bussaco.

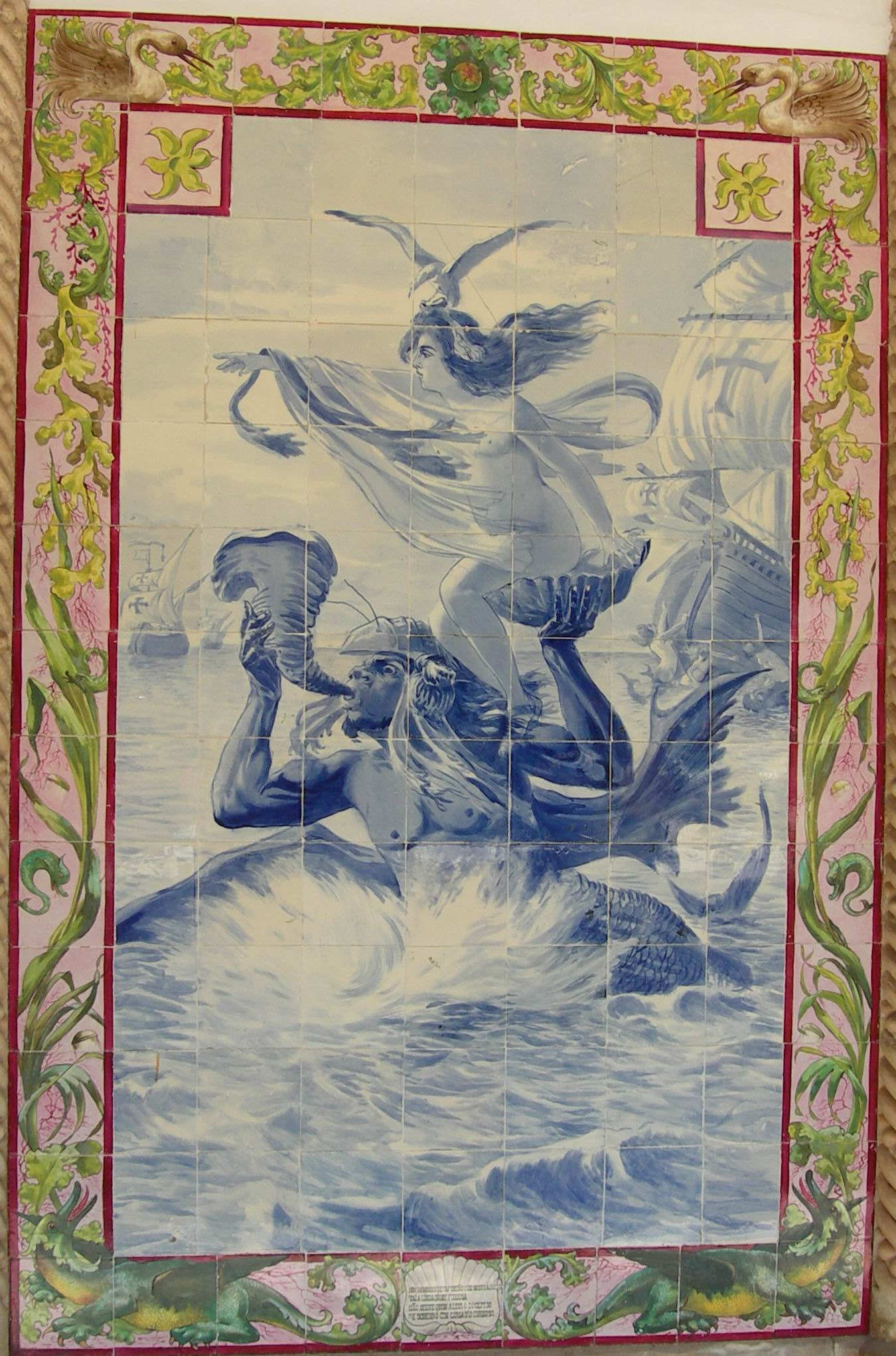
Decorative tile panel at Bussaco Palace Hotel.

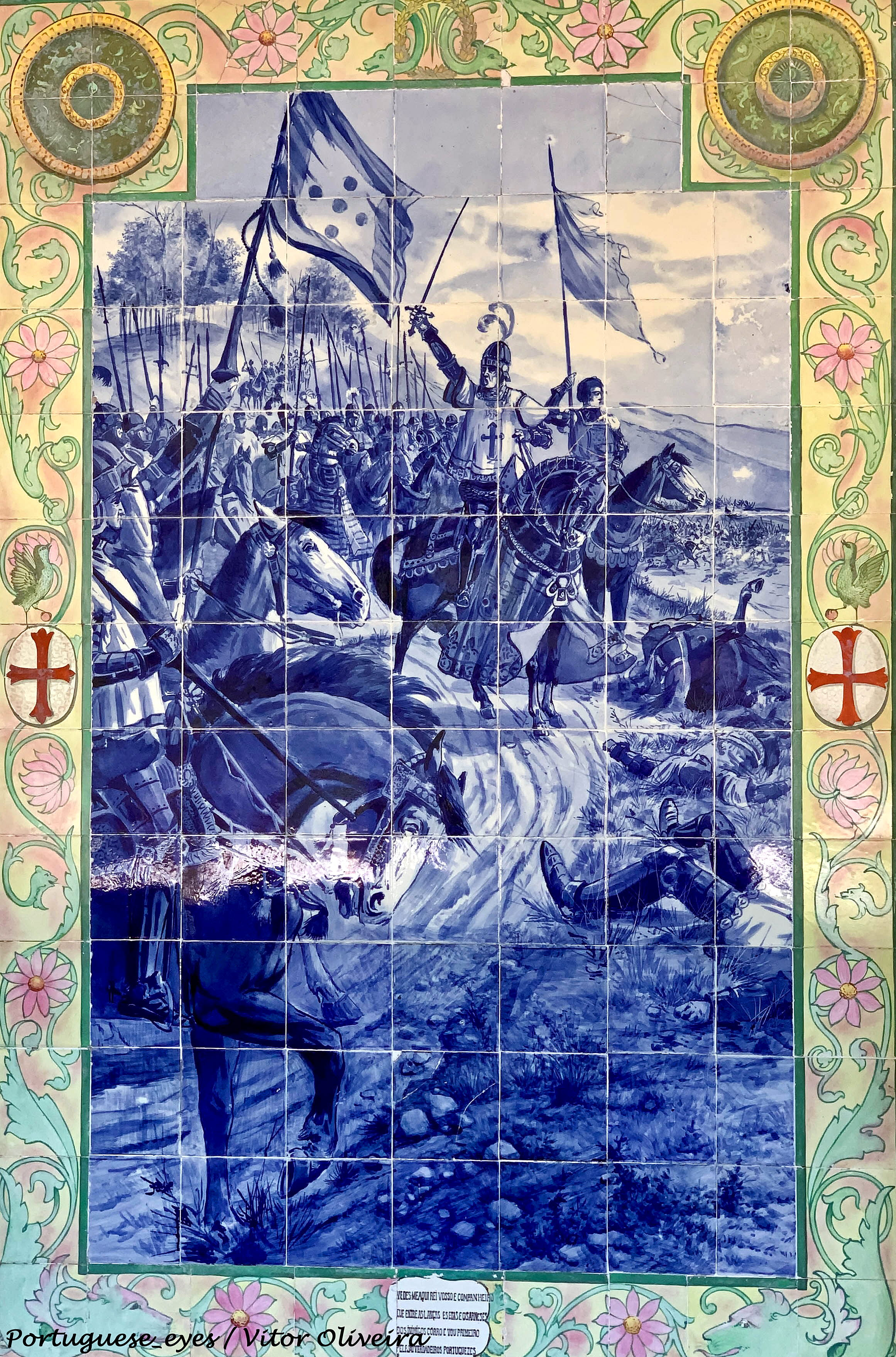
Decorative tile panel at Bussaco Palace Hotel.

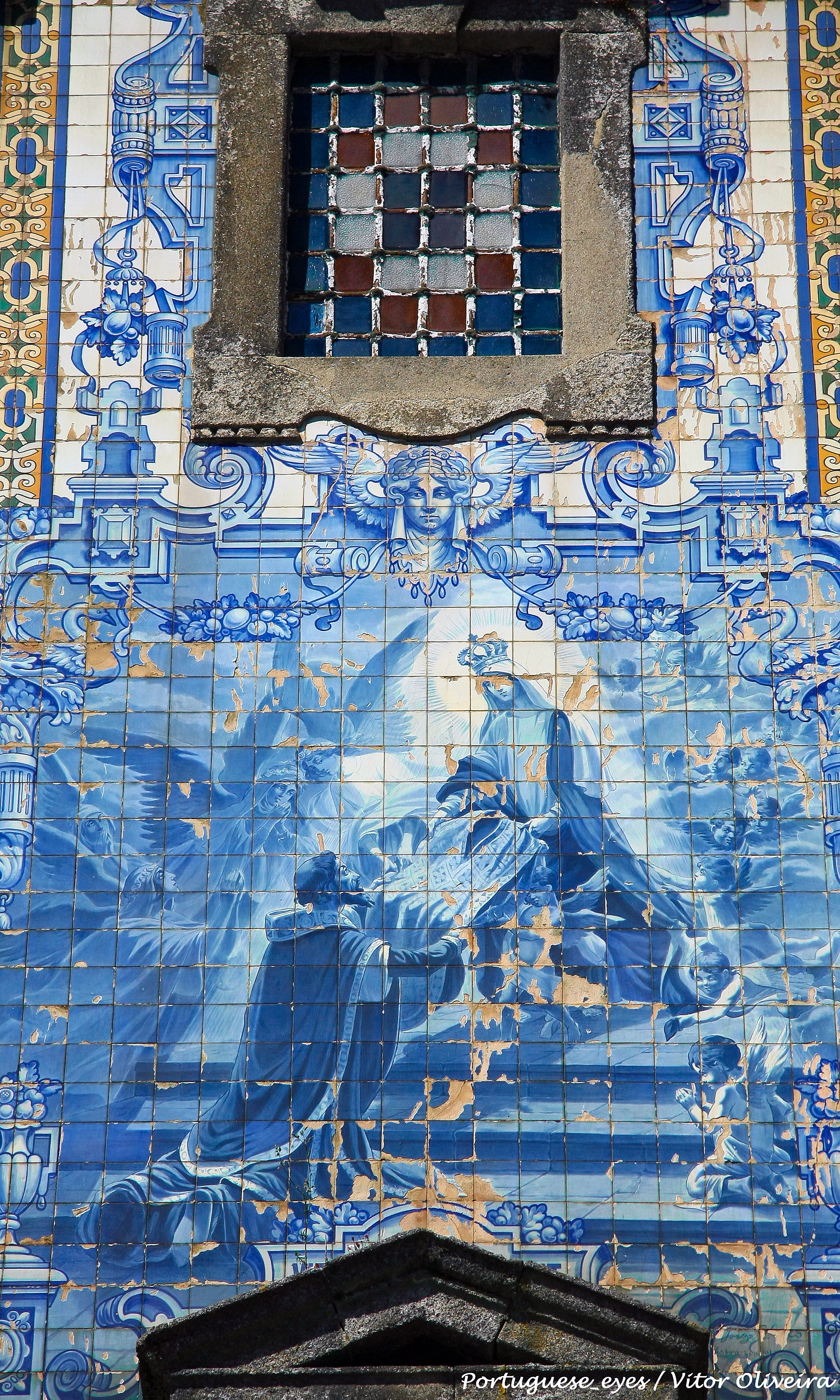
Tile panel at Santo Ildefonso church in Portugal.

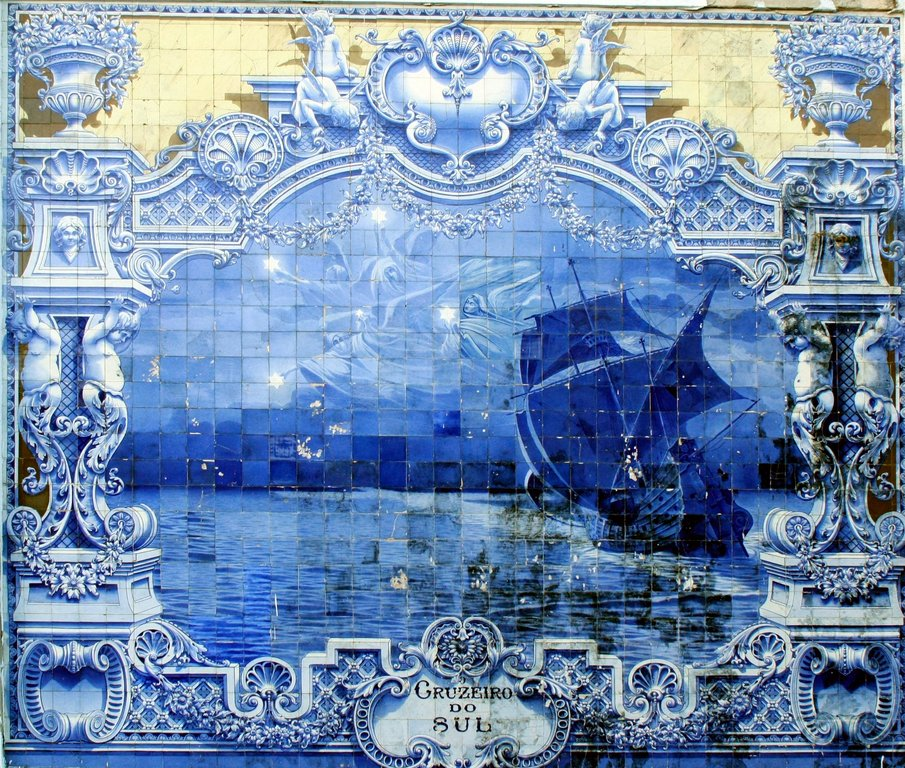
"Southern Cross" at Edward VII Park in Lisbon.

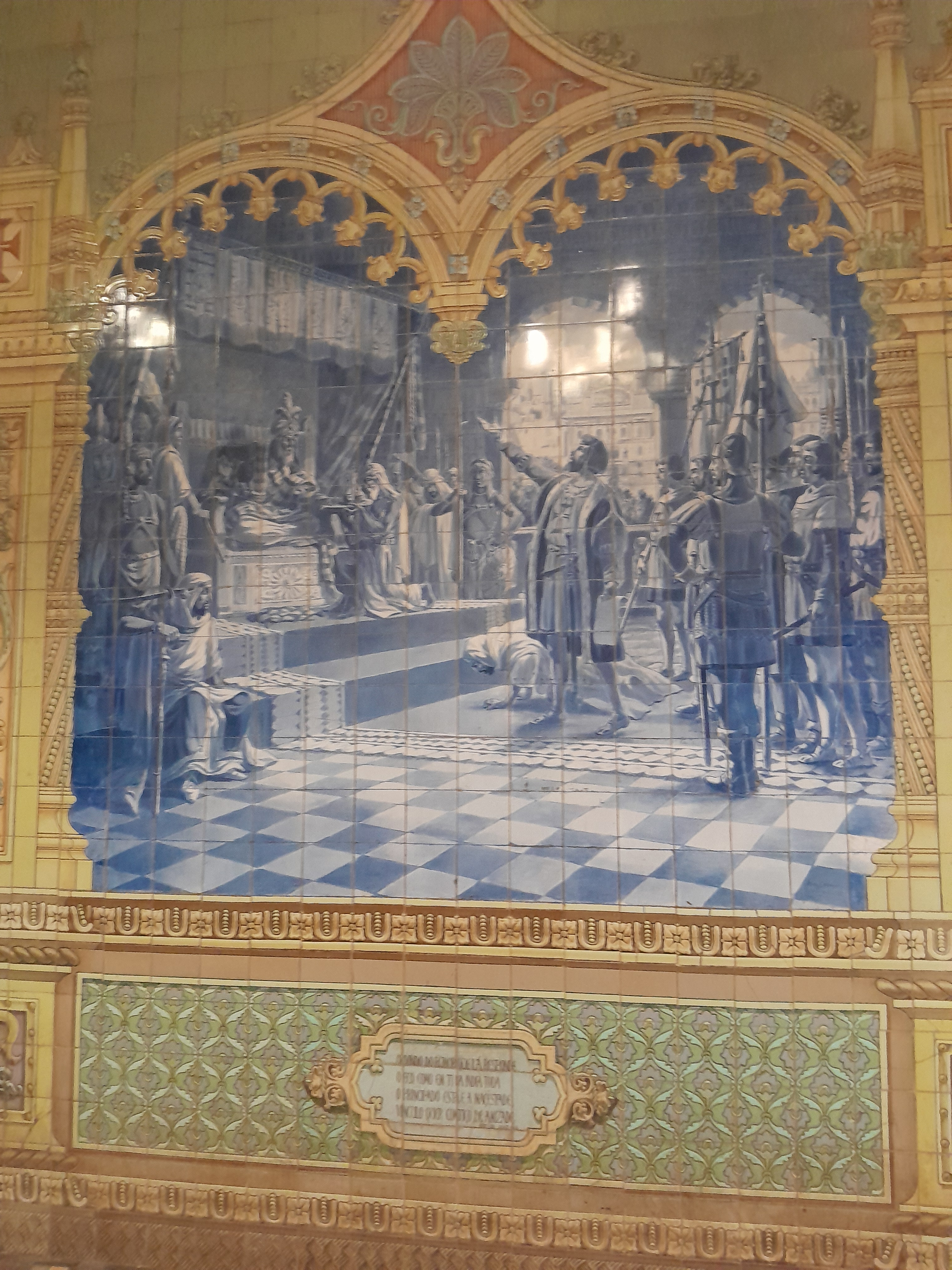
Vasco da Gama meeting the Zamorin, at Instituto Menezes Braganza, Goa, the only place in India with Colaço's work.

== Distinctions ==
=== National orders ===
- Grand Officer of the Order of Saint James of the Sword (16 September 1936)
