= Aigyr-Zhal 2 =

- Location of the site of Aigyr-Zhal
- 41°26′00″N 76°00′00″E
- Type: Settlement
- Location: Naryn, Kyrgyzstan

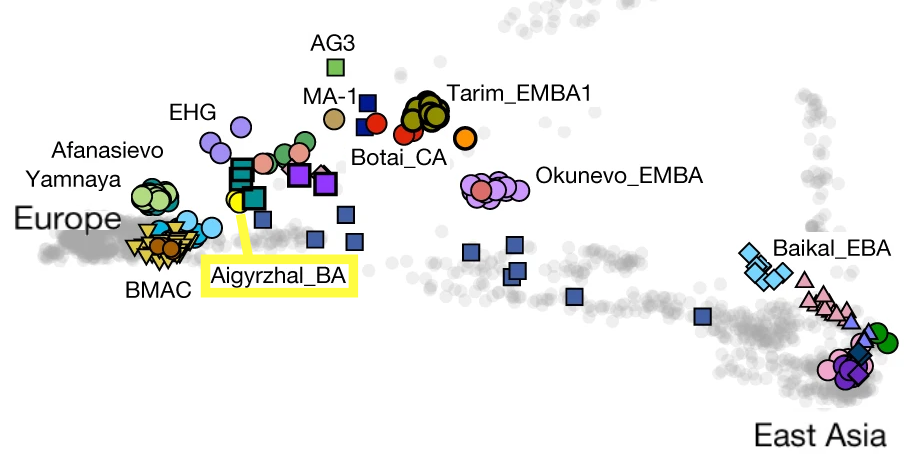
Genetic proximity of the Aigyr-Zhal Bronze Age remains ( ), with ancient (color) and modern (grey) populations. Primary Component Analysis (detail).

Aigyr-Zhal 2 is a historical site in Naryn city on the territory of University of Central Asia (UCA), Kyrgyzstan. It is a part of a bigger and more complex site Aigyr-Zhal. It is dated between Mesolithic time and the Middle Ages. Aigyr-Zhal is the only site in the Tian-Shan that has evidence of human occupation from Mesolithic (12th millennium BC) time till the Turkic period (13th century AD). It was first discovered in 1953 by Akhmat Kibirov. However, during the Soviet time the site was partially destroyed, therefore it was impossible to research the site for a long time. Only in 2012 it was first researched by Kubat Tabaldiev's archaeological team. The length of Aigyr-Zhal 2 is 300 metres, while the width is 100 metres, and the height of the site is 2026 metres above the sea level. Since 2002 the whole Aigyr-Zhal complex has been on the list of national importance of Kyrgyzstan.

== Methodology ==
During the excavations different methods were used for finding artifacts:

- Cleaning
- Gridding is a system of perpendicular lines and equally spaced points to form a rectangle or square which is used as a frame of locational reference on an archaeological site.
- Digging using equipment as trowels and shovels
- Screening: the sieving of excavated soil and sediment through mesh, to recover artifacts not found in excavation.
- Flotation is a method for recovering very small artifacts from excavating sediments using water.
- Photographing artifacts and other findings
- Total station is the instrument that is used to measure sloping distance of objects to the instrument, horizontal angles and vertical angles.
- Mapping
- Cataloging data

== Archaeological excavations ==
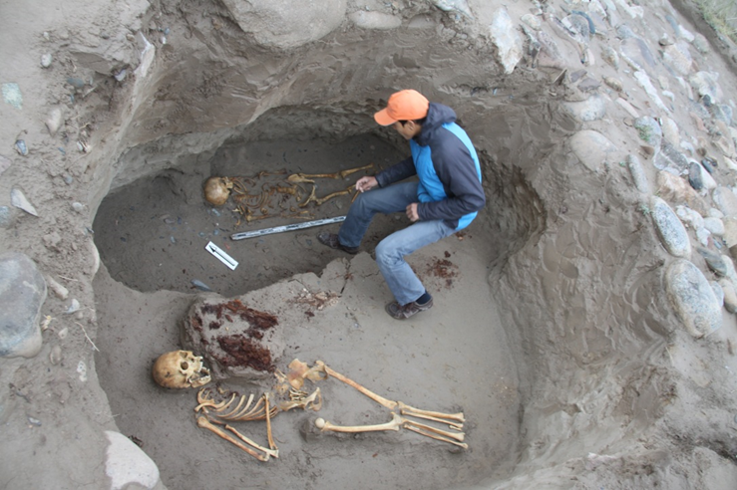
Human remains, 2013

The first archaeological excavations of Aigyr-Zhal 2 started in 2012 by Kubat Tabaldiev and other archaeologists. He was invited by representatives of University of Central Asia, who found human bones during construction of the road that situated next to the site. During his excavations he found many burial mounds that are dated back to Bronze Age until Turkic era. After findings of stone tools, he invited another archaeologist Aida Abdykanova. Due to her it was possible to find another cultural layer that dated back to Mesolithic Age (13100-13850 BP).

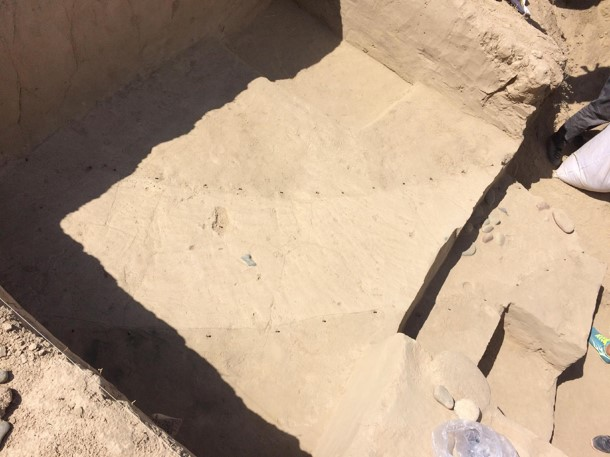
Traces of the supposed wall

Since 2012, the archaeological excavations of the site takes place every year.

In 2013 excavations continued by archaeological team consisted of students of anthropology department of American University of Central Asia (AUCA) under the guidance of Aida Abdykanova. During the investigations the team found burial mound with human remains that were dated to Iron Age till Saka period (VIII-III BC).

In 2014, the archaeological team and students of AUCA continued the excavations of the previous years. At the same time students from Jusup Balasagyn National University participated in the excavation process too. During those excavation years a lot of organic and inorganic materials were found on the territory of Aigyr-Zhal 2 site. In 2014 archaeologists opened Area # 1, but this area was not very well studied in 2014, because only 8m^{2} were excavated, but in 2015 and in 2016 the excavations' works on that area were continued. In 2015 the area was widened, and 39m^{2} were studied. In 2016, 13m^{2} more were studied. In 2017, there were 2 sections, the first section was 87m^{2} and the second section was 16m^{2}. In 2018 the purpose was to dig deeper and to study already more opened 103m^{2}.

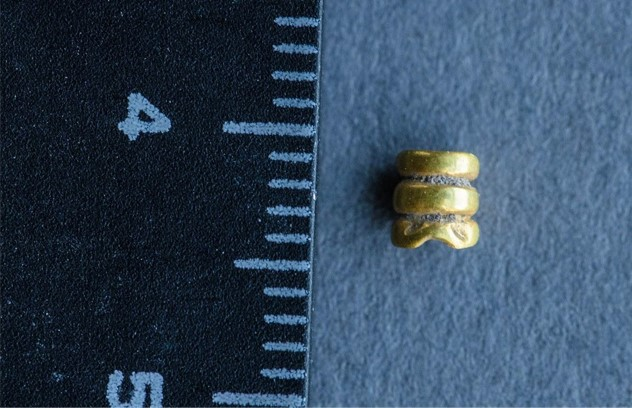
Golden bead

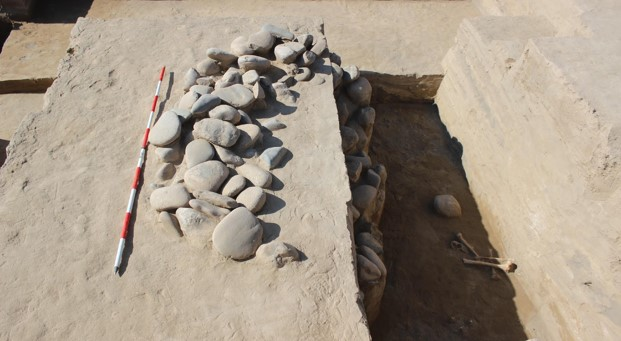
Stone structure

In 2016 many different materials were found. The most important finding was wall-like structure. The most likely assumption what it can be is a wall. However, in 2018 after finding some salt on the top of wall-like structure, appears another assumption that it can be a stream as well.

In 2017, it was decided to continue excavate previous areas that were excavated in 2016, including wall-like structure, in order to reveal its shape. In addition, several ritual pits of Iron Age, Mesolithic Age and Bronze Age were found. All of them had traces of fireplaces such as charcoal, ash, ceramics. Another interesting finding was Stone structure, next to which were human bones. More likely, it was a burial mound, the shoe shaped form tells that likely it was burial mound of Hunnic Era.

In 2018, the archaeological team consisted of students of AUCA and Indiana University under A. Abdykanova and A. Pybern continued the excavation of Aigyr-Zhal 2. In the ritual pit dated to Iron Age were found fragments of charcoal, ceramics and ship remains. In addition, fish scales, shells, microlithic tools, cores were found. The most interesting finding was golden bead, supposedly part of necklace. It was found on the west from stone structure in the place of finding human remains in 2017 and 2018. After analysis of human bones it was confirmed the sex of a person buried there: a woman.
