= Svitlana Pyrkalo =

Ukrainian writer (born 1976)

Svitlana Pyrkalo (born 1976, in Poltava, Ukrainian SSR) is a London-based writer, journalist and translator who writes in Ukrainian, English and Russian.

== Early life and education ==
Svitlana Pyrkalo was born in 1976, in Poltava, Ukrainian SSR. She studied the Ukrainian language at the Taras Shevchenko State University in Kyiv.

== Career ==
Svitlana Pyrkalo began her working life in the secretariat of Narodny Rukh Ukrainy, a national democratic political party in Ukraine. She subsequently became an author, journalist, and linguist.

In 2000, she became editor-in-chief of a television talk show, Without Taboo (Без табу), at the Ukrainian 1+1 channel, dedicated to unusual human stories, with elements of dramatization.

From 2007 to 2009, Pyrkalo wrote a weekly column in the Ukrainian-language magazine Glavred (Главред). From 2006 until 2010, she wrote a weekly column for the Ukrainian newspaper, Gazeta po-ukrainsky (Газета по-українськи). In 2007 these collected articles, together with works of three other authors, were published as a book by Nora-druk publishers.

Until April 2011, she was a journalist and producer with the BBC Ukrainian service, and presented the Friday interactive evening program in Ukraine from London. She is also the originator of the BBC Ukrainian annual book prize of which she is a permanent panel member.

In 2018, she was one of the Ukrainian "young intellectuals" selected to contribute an essay to New Europe, a volume initiated by the New Europe Center in Kyiv and published by the Old Lion Publishing House.

In 2020, she joined the board of trustees of the Ukrainian Institute of London.

As of 2019, she works for the European Bank for Reconstruction and Development.

== Books ==
In 1998, she compiled and published The First Dictionary of Ukrainian Slang (Перший словник українського молодіжного сленгу) which was reviewed by Valerii Polkovsky in the Canadian Slavonic Papers who wrote that it "has no predecessors" and deserved to be translated into English. It was also reviewed in the Journal of Ukrainian Studies. It has since been used and quoted by other researchers.

Her first short novel Green Margarita (Зелена Маргарита) was described by Tamara Hundorova in the Journal of Ukrainian Studies as part of the "literature with mass appeal" after the merger of "postmodern subcultures of the 1990s", and was awarded 2nd place in a Smoloskyp publishers contest for young writers. Subsequently, it was published by Smoloskyp in 2000, and has since been republished twice (2002, 2007) by two different publishers. Maria G. Rewakowicz writes in Harvard Ukrainian Studies that her "offhand and fragmentary manner of narration, quite in line with postmodernist premises, helps her to debunk the entrenched gender stereotypes and to parody the trivialities found in a number of women's magazines." Rewakowicz also describes Pyrkalo as often seen as a disciple of Oksana Zabuzhko, and writes with Alexandra Hrycak in Studies in East European Thought that Zabuzhko was proud to be a "mother figure" to her and other women writers.

In 2002, together with colleagues T. Vorozhko and M. Veresen, she published a book describing their TV experience, Without Taboo about "Without Taboo" (Без табу про "Без Табу") with "Zeleny Pes" publishers.

In 2004, Pyrkalo's second novel, Don't Think About Red (Не думай про червоне), was published by Fakt publishers. Rewakowicz writes, "there are obvious autobiographical parallels between the heroine and Pyrkalo, but what is particularly striking about the story as it unfolds is the easiness with which Pavlina, the main protagonist, adapts to the host country."

In 2007, Fakt also published her collection of essays on food, travel and Ukrainian identity Egoist's Kitchen (Кухня Егоїста). In 2007, Pyrkalo also translated into Ukrainian the novel Two Caravans by Marina Lewycka.

In 2014, her work was included in Michael M. Naydan's Herstories: An Anthology of New Ukrainian Women Prose Writers.

== Selected publications ==
- Перший словник українського молодіжного сленгу. Vipol, Kyiv, 1998.
- Зелена Маргарита. 1999.
- Без табу про "Без Табу. Zeleny Pes, 2002. (With T. Vorozhko and M. Veresen)
- Не думай про червоне. Fakt publishers, Kyіv, 2004.
- Кухня Егоїста. 2007.
