= Dimitrij Bunzmann =

German chess grandmaster (born 1982)

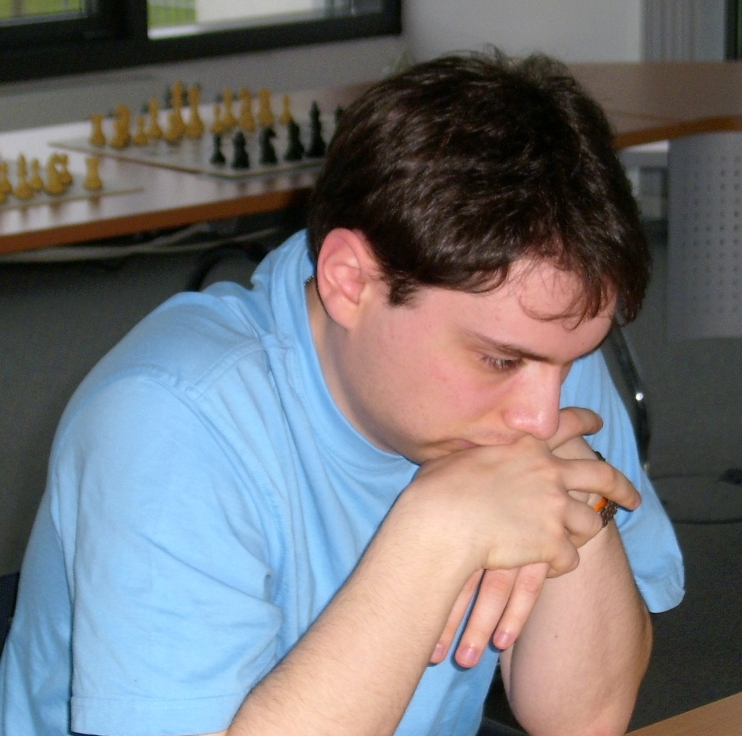

Personal information
- Born: 21 February 1982 (age 44) Tekeli, Kazakhstan

Chess career
- Country: Germany
- Title: Grandmaster (2003)
- FIDE rating: 2444 (July 2026)
- Peak rating: 2596 (July 1999)
- Peak ranking: No. 93 (July 1999)

Dimitrij Bunzmann (born 21 February 1982) is a German chess grandmaster. He was awarded the grandmaster title in 2003. His peak Elo rating was 2596, which he reached in July 1999.

== Chess career ==
Bunzmann represented Germany at the World Junior Chess Championship in Yerevan in 2000. In January 2004 he won the 4th Griesheim GM tournament with 6.5/9, finishing the event undefeated.

He was also selected for the German Chess Federation's B squad in 2005 and 2006.
