= Halyna Korin =

Halyna Korin Галина (Анна) Іванівна Корінь
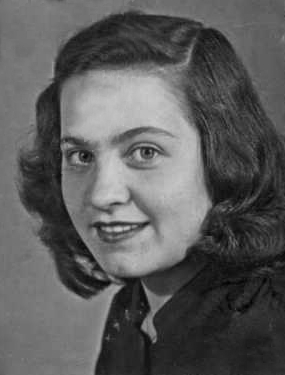
- Halyna (Anna) Korin at age 22

Background information
- Birth name: Halyna Ivanivna Glouchowera
- Born: May 12, 1926; Klymivka (Poltava Oblast), Ukraine
- Died: March 1, 2014 (aged 87); Melbourne, Australia
- Occupations: Composer; writer
- Instruments: Vocals; bandura

Halyna (Anna) Ivanivna Korin (Галина (Анна) Іванівна Корінь) was a bandura player, singer (soprano), and writer born May 12, 1926, in Klymivka (Poltava Oblast), Ukraine. She emigrated to Germany in 1944 and then Australia in 1949. Korin died on March 1, 2014, in Melbourne.

== Biography ==
Halyna (Anna) Korin's parents were Iwan (1903–1981) and Paraska Glouchowera (born 1898) and she was raised with two siblings. From 1939 to 1943 Korin worked at the Krasnograd City Theater in the Kharkiv region until she emigrated to Germany in 1944. While there, she married orchestra leader, Stefan Ivanovych Korin (1914–2007) in October 1948. Korin emigrated to Adelaide, Australia in 1949 with Stefan, their families, and members of the Tchaika Choir.

From 1951 the Korin family lived in Melbourne where Stefan restarted their choir, with Korin as soprano. The Tchaika Choir released several albums of Ukrainian folk songs and popular works by Ukrainian composers, and in 1985 they performed in Los Angeles. In 1978 Korin founded the bandurist ensemble «Колорит» (English: "Colouring") and led it for over twenty years.

Outside of music, Korin wrote plays and poems, which were collected in Works of Halyna Korin: Songs, Poetry, Humorous Stories (1989). She worked for the biweekly newspaper, Ukrainian in Australia, which was published in Melbourne until 1985, and was the chair of the Poltava Society in Australia.

Korin sang on Recital Michael Minsky - Live, an album by Michael Minsky recorded in 1976 at the Ukrainian Town Hall in Lidcombe, New South Wales. It was released digitally in 2018.

Halyna Ivanivna Korin died on March 1, 2014. She is buried in the Ukrainian section of Faulkner Cemetery next to her husband, Stefan Korin.
