= Solomiia Pavlychko =

Ukrainian literary critic, philosopher, feminist and translator

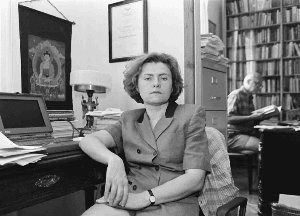
- Born: December 15, 1958; Lviv, Ukrainian SSR, Soviet Union
- Died: December 31, 1999 (aged 41); Kyiv, Ukraine
- Burial place: Baikove Cemetery
- Education: Kyiv University
- Occupations: Writer, literary scholar, translator, publicist
- Known for: Introducing gender studies and feminist analysis to Ukraine
- Notable work: The Discourse of Modernism in Ukrainian Literature
- Spouse(s): Mykhailo Zahrebelny (div.1990); Bohdan Krawchenko
- Children: Bohdana (Dana) Pavlychko (b.1987)
- Father: Dmytro Pavlychko

Solomiia Dmytrivna Pavlychko (Ukrainian: Соломія Дмитрівна Павличко; December 15, 1958 – December 31, 1999) was a Ukrainian literary critic, philosopher, feminist, and translator. She is considered as one of the pioneering scholars to introduce gender studies and feminist analysis to Ukraine.

== Biography ==
Solomiia Pavlychko was born December 15, 1958, in Lviv. Her father was the Ukrainian poet Dmytro Pavlychko, and her mother was Bohdana Pavlychko, a doctor. She graduated in English and French from the Romance-Germanic Faculty of Kyiv University, earning a PhD in English literature in 1984.

From 1985 she worked at the National Academy of Science of Ukraine. She was a Doctor of Philosophy, a professor at the University of Kyiv-Mohyla Academy, who in 1990, launched an initiative to found women's studies in Ukraine. Inviting scholars Vira Ageyeva, Tamara Hundorova, and Natalka Shumylo to participate, Pavlychko established a feminist seminar at the Institute of Literature of the National Academy of Sciences of Ukraine in September 1990. It was the first time the methodology of feminist analysis and gender criticism was introduced in the country. These same women established a feminist section in the academic journal Slovo i Chas (Word and Time) and began publishing works such her 1991 article Is a Feminist School Necessary for Ukrainian Literary Studies? The work of these scholars inspired other academics throughout Ukraine to establish women's and gender studies programs. Pavlychko lectured at prestigious universities such as Harvard University and the University of Alberta, and also taught at the restored Kyiv Mohyla Academy.

Pavlychko was a member of the Writer's Union of Ukraine. She was also a visiting professor at the University of Alberta, and at Harvard University, where she was a Fulbright fellow. Since 1992 she was the head of the editorial board of the publishing house Osnovy in Kyiv. Pavlychko wrote book-length studies of American romanticism, Byron, the modern English novel and modernism in Ukrainian literature. Her memoir of the first years of Ukrainian independence in 1990–1, Letters from Kiev, was published in English in 1992. At the age of 37 Pavlychko presented her doctor's thesis with the title Discourse of Modernism in Ukrainian Literature. An eponymous book published by her on the base of the paper became a bestseller among Ukrainian intellectuals. She was also a prolific translator: among her Ukrainian translations are William Golding's Lord of the Flies (Kyiv, 1999) and D. H. Lawrence's Lady Chatterley's Lover. Mrs. Pavlychko also contributed to the work of the World Bank/UNESCO Task Force on Higher Education in Developing Countries, whose report was issued in Feb. 2000. She left unfinished a biography of the Ukrainian poet and orientalist Ahatanhel Krymsky.

Solomiia Pavlychko died on December 31, 1999, of accidental carbon monoxide poisoning and was buried on 4 January 2000 in Kyiv's Baikove Cemetery.

== Work ==
Already as a high school student, Solomiya consulted her father, who during that time worked as chief editor of Vsesvit magazine, on the topic of contemporary British literature. During her studies of Romance and Germanic philology she researched new English novels, reflected on the works of Byron, edited translations of T. S. Eliot and translated works of Emily Dickinson. Following her doctor's thesis, she continued her research of foreign literature, but in 1990 started working in the sphere of literary theory at the invitation of Viacheslav Briukhovetsky. Concentrating predominantly on Ukrainian literature, Pavlychko studied its works with the use of theories such as structuralism, psychoanalysis and postcolonialism, which had been unavailable in Soviet times.

In her work dedicated to Ukrainian literary Modernism, she presents a perspective on works by a broad spectre of authors, from Lesia Ukrainka to the generation of Executed Renaissance and post-WW2 emigration. Comparing Ukrainian literature with the literatures of European countiries, Pavlychko promotes the idea of Ukrainian culture being part of the Western cultural sphere. She views Modernism as a way of establishing modern liberal democracy and overturning Ukraine's totalitarian legacy. Feminism is seen by her as an important instrument in the deconstruction of patriarchal values, traditional gender roles and canons imposed during the Soviet era.

The Osnovy publishing house, established by Pavlychko together with her future husband Bohdan Krawchenko in 1992, aimed to make classical humanitarian works accessible to the Ukrainian public. It was the first to publish works of authors such as Simone de Beauvoir, Michel Foucault, Max Weber, Mircea Eliade, Karl Popper, Ronald Dworkin and John Rawls in Ukrainian language.

== Personal life and family ==
Having grown up in Kyiv, Pavlychko emphasized her Western Ukrainian origin and identified as Hutsul. She was known as a collector of books and art, loved sushi and attended football games.

Her first marriage was to Mykhailo Zahrebelny, son of Ukrainian writer Pavlo Zahrebelny. The couple had one daughter Bohdana (Dana), born in 1987. After divorcing Zahrebelny in 1990, Pavlychko married her publishing companion, Canadian political scientist Bohdan Krawchenko. Solomiya's daughter Dana continued her mother's work and headed the Osnovy publishing house from 2011 to 2024.

== Publications ==
- The Philosophical Poetry of American Romanticism (in Russian, Kyiv, 1988)
- Byron: His Life and Works (in Ukrainian, Kyiv, 1989)
- Letters from Kyiv (in English, Edmonton, 1992)
- The Labyrinths of Thought: The Intellectual Novel of Contemporary Great Britain (in Ukrainian, Kyiv, 1993)
- The Discourse of Modernism in Ukrainian Literature (in Ukrainian, Kyiv, 1997, 2nd ed. 1999)

=== Posthumous publications ===
- Nationality, Sexuality, Orientalism: the Complex World of Ahatanhel Krymsky (in Ukrainian, Kyiv, 2000, 2nd ed. 2001)
- Foreign Literature: Studies and Critical Articles (in Ukrainian, Kyiv, 2001)
- Theory of Literature (in Ukrainian, Kyiv, 2002)
- Feminism: Articles, Studies, Exchanges and Interviews (in Ukrainian, Kyiv, 2002)
