= Vira Ageyeva =

Ukrainian literary critic

- Віра Павлівна Агеєва
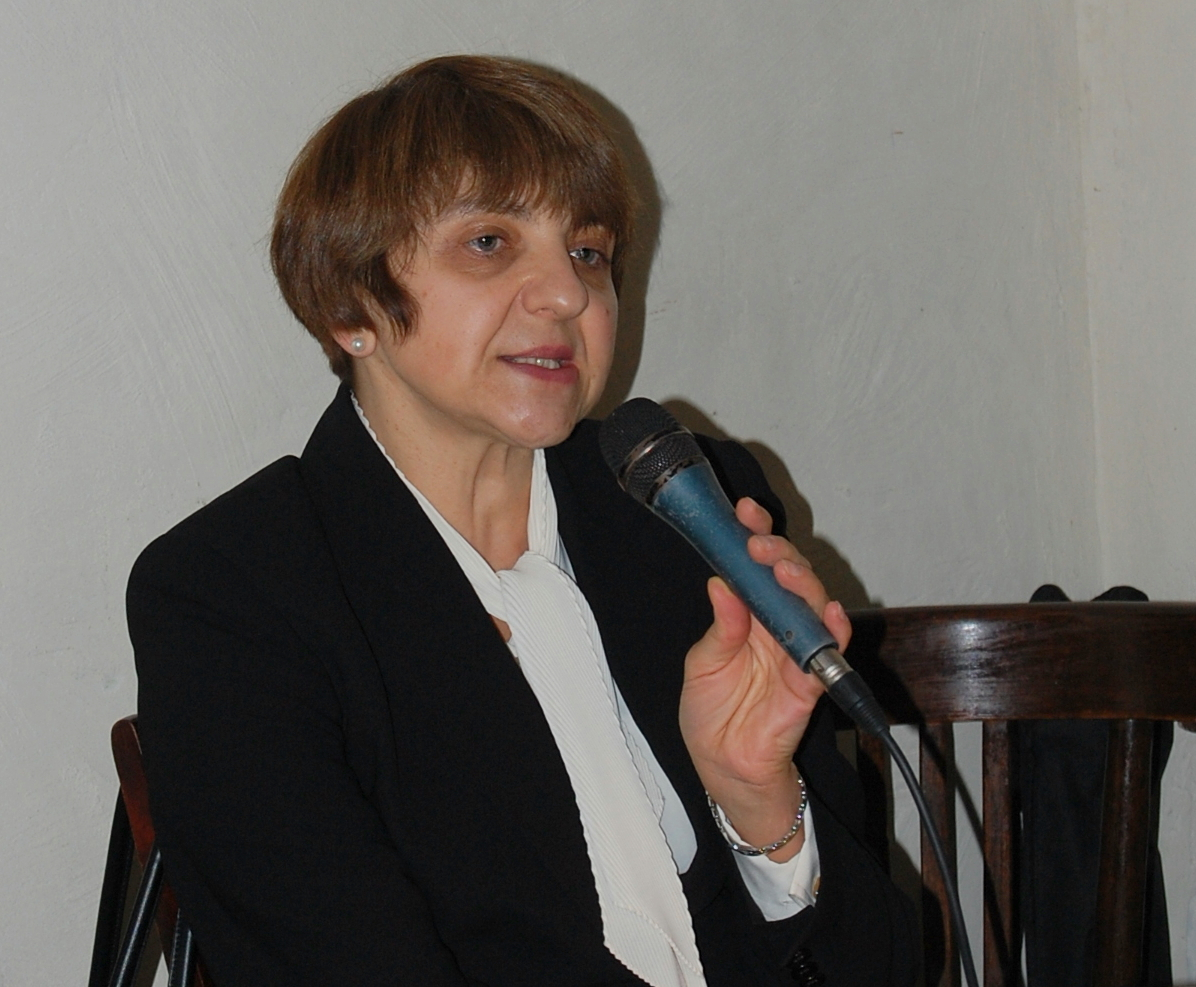
- Born: Vira Pavlivna Ageyeva; 30 July 1958 (age 68); Bakhmach, Chernihiv Oblast, Ukrainian Soviet Socialist Republic
- Other names: Vira Aheyeva, Vira Ageeva
- Education: Taras Shevchenko National University of Kyiv
- Occupations: literary critic, philologist
- Years active: 1980–present
- Awards: Shevchenko National Prize (1996)

Vira Ageyeva (Ukrainian: Віра Павлівна Агеєва, born 1958) is a Ukrainian literary critic and philologist. In 1990, she and other scholars established the first feminist seminars in the country as an initiative of the National Academy of Sciences of Ukraine and she was a co-founder of the Kyiv Institute for Gender Studies in 1998. She was honored as a joint winner of the Shevchenko National Prize in 1996 and the Petro Mohyla Prize, an award given by Academic Council of the National University of Kyiv-Mohyla Academy, in 2008.

== Early life and education ==
Vira Pavlivna Ageyeva was born 30 July 1958 in Bakhmach, Chernihiv Oblast, Ukrainian Soviet Socialist Republic. In 1980, she graduated from the Taras Shevchenko National University in Kyiv and began working as a senior researcher of the Institute of Literature there. From 1985, she was employed at the Institute of Literature of the National Academy of Sciences of Ukraine. In 1990, Aheyeva, Tamara Hundorova, and Natalka Shumylo worked with Solomiia Pavlychko to establish a feminist seminar at the Institute of Literature of the National Academy. It was the first time the methodology of feminist analysis and gender criticism was introduced in the country. These same women established a feminist section in the academic journal Slovo i Chas (Word and Time) and began publishing works such as Aheyeva's Women's Space: Feminist Discourse of Ukrainian Modernism, hoping to establish feminist analysis within literary studies. Their work led to other academics establishing gender studies programs throughout the country. In 1995, Ageyeva earned her PhD in philology from the same institution.

== Career ==
After completing her doctorate, Ageyeva started her career as the deputy editor-in-chief of the academic journal Slovo i Chas in 1995. The following year, she was appointed as a professor at the National University of Kyiv-Mohyla Academy. She was a co-founder of the Київського інституту ґендерних досліджен (Kyiv Center for Gender Studies), which was launched at the National Academy's Institute of Literature in 1998. Between 2006 and 2007, Ageyeva was the third Chopivsky Fellow of Ukrainian Studies at Stanford University near Palo Alto, California.

== Research ==
Ageyeva's work focuses on the issues of gender identity and the complexity of gender relationships as they are portrayed in literature. Her literary criticism evaluates from a psychoanalytical perspective the characters and traditional values as they conflict with contemporary context. She is interested in the 20th-century styles of Ukrainian prose of the 20th century, and particularly the Ukrainian writers who were part of the Executed Renaissance. She has profusely published literary criticism with a gender perspective in journals such as Berezil, the journal of the National Writers' Union of Ukraine which was formerly known as Прапор (Flag) until 1991; Fatherland; and Slovo i Chas. For example, in such articles as "A Voice of Her Own: Female Integrity and the Modernist Revolt", in Other Optics: Gender Challenges of Today, Ageyeva notes that women authors were often excluded from literary canons, forcing them to find their ways to express their authentic voices. Ukrainian women writers, thus turned away from 19th-century objective realism and introduced modernist trends of subjectivity.

In 1996, Ageyeva published in conjunction with multiple other authors, a textbook in two volumes, edited by Vitaliy Donchyk, which was a philological guide for university students. Eight of the authors, including Ageyeva, Donchyk, Yuri Kovaliv, Andriy Kravchenko, Volodymyr A. Melnyk, Volodymyr Morenets, Mykhailo Nayenko, and Hryhoriy Shton received the Shevchenko National Prize in 1996 for their work on the textbooks. Her work Поетика парадокса: інтелектуальна проза Віктора Петрова-Домонтовича (Poetics of Paradox: Intellectual Prose of Victor Petrov-Domontovich) won the 2008 Petro Mohyla Prize of the Academic Council of the National University of Kyiv-Mohyla Academy and her work on Maksym Rylsky, published in 2012, received a literary scholarship award from the magazine LitAkcent. In the book, she had argued that Rylsky had rejected Socialist realism, the official literary style, in favor of a neoclassical Ukrainian method.

== Selected works ==
- Агеєва, Віра Павлівна; Бойко, Леонид Сергеевич; Вакуленко, Дия Теодорівна; Дончик, В. Г. (1989). Діалектика художнього пошуку: Літературний процес 60-80-х [The Dialectic of Artistic Search: The Literary Process of the 60-80's] (in Ukrainian). Kyiv: Наукова думка. ISBN 978-5-12-000710-8.
- Агеєва, Віра Павлівна (1989). Пам'ять подвигу: українська воєнна проза 60 - 80-х років [Memory of the Feat: Ukrainian Military Prose of the 60's-80's] (in Ukrainian). Kyiv: Наукова думка. ISBN 978-5-12-000695-8.
- Агеєва, Віра Павлівна (1990). Олекса Слісаренко: до 100-річчя від дня народження [Oleksa Slisarenko: On the 100th Anniversary of Her Birth] (in Ukrainian). Kyiv: Т-во "Знання" URSR. ISBN 978-5-7770-0016-3.
- Агеєва, Віра Павлівна; Моренець, Володимир Пилипович; Ковалів, Юрій Іванович; Мельник, Володимир О.; et al. (1994). Дончик, Віталій Григорович (ed.). Історія української літератури XX ст.: у 2-х книгах [History of Ukrainian Literature of the 20th Century: In Two Volumes (Volume 1: 1910–1930)] (in Ukrainian). Vol. 1. 1910-1930-ті роки. Kyiv, Ukraine: Lybid. ISBN 978-5-325-00571-8.
- Агеєва, Віра Павлівна; Ковалів, Юрій Іванович; Кравченко, Андрій Євгенович; Мельник, Володимир О.; Моренець, Володимир Пилипович; Наєнко, Михайло Кузьмович; Штонь, Григорій Максимович; et al. (1994). Дончик, Віталій Григорович (ed.). Історія української літератури XX ст.: у 2-х книгах [History of Ukrainian Literature of the 20th Century: In Two Volumes (Volume 2, part 1: 1940s- 1950s)] (in Ukrainian). Vol. 2. ч. 1 (1940–ві – 1950–ті роки). Kyiv, Ukraine: Lybid. ISBN 978-5-325-00476-6.
- Агеєва, В. П. (1994). Українська імпресіоністична проза [Ukrainian Impressionist Prose] (in Ukrainian). Kyiv: Інститут літератури імені Т. Г. Шевченка. ISBN 978-5-7702-0909-9.
- Агеєва, Віра Павлівна (2001). Поетеса зламу століть: творчість Лесі Українки в постмодерній інтерпретації [Poetess of the Turn of the Century: The Work of Lesya Ukrainka in a Postmodern Interpretation] (in Ukrainian) (Vyd. 2, stereotypne ed.). Kyiv: Lybid. ISBN 978-966-06-0182-6.
- Агеєва, В. П. (2003). Жіночий простір: феміністичний дискурс українського модернізму [Women's Space: The Feminist Discourse of Ukrainian Modernism] (in Ukrainian). Kyiv: Вид-во Факт. ISBN 978-966-359-294-7.
- Агеєва, В. П. (2006). Поетика парадокса: інтелектуальна проза Віктора Петрова-Домонтовича [Poetics of Paradox: Intellectual Prose of Victor Petrov-Domontovich] (in Ukrainian). Kyiv: Факт. ISBN 978-966-359-133-9.
- Агеєва, В. П. (2012). Мистецтво рівноваги: Максим Рильський на тлі епохи [The Art of Balance: Maksym Rylsky against the Background of the Era] (in Ukrainian). Kyiv: Видавництво Книга. ISBN 978-966-8314-66-7.
- Агеєва, В. П. (2018). Візерунок на камені: Микола Бажан; життєпис (не)радянського поета [Pattern on the Stone: Mykola Bazhan; Biography of a (non-) Soviet Poet] (in Ukrainian). Lviv: Видавництво Старого Лева. ISBN 978-617-679-452-3.
- Ageyeva, Vira; Martsenyuk, Tamara, eds. (2019). Insha optyka: Genderni vyklyky suchasnosti [Other Optics: Gender Challenges of Today] (in Ukrainian). Kyiv: Smoloskyp. ISBN 978-617-7622-08-5.
