= Bohdan Krawchenko =

Ukrainian-Canadian historian and academic administrator

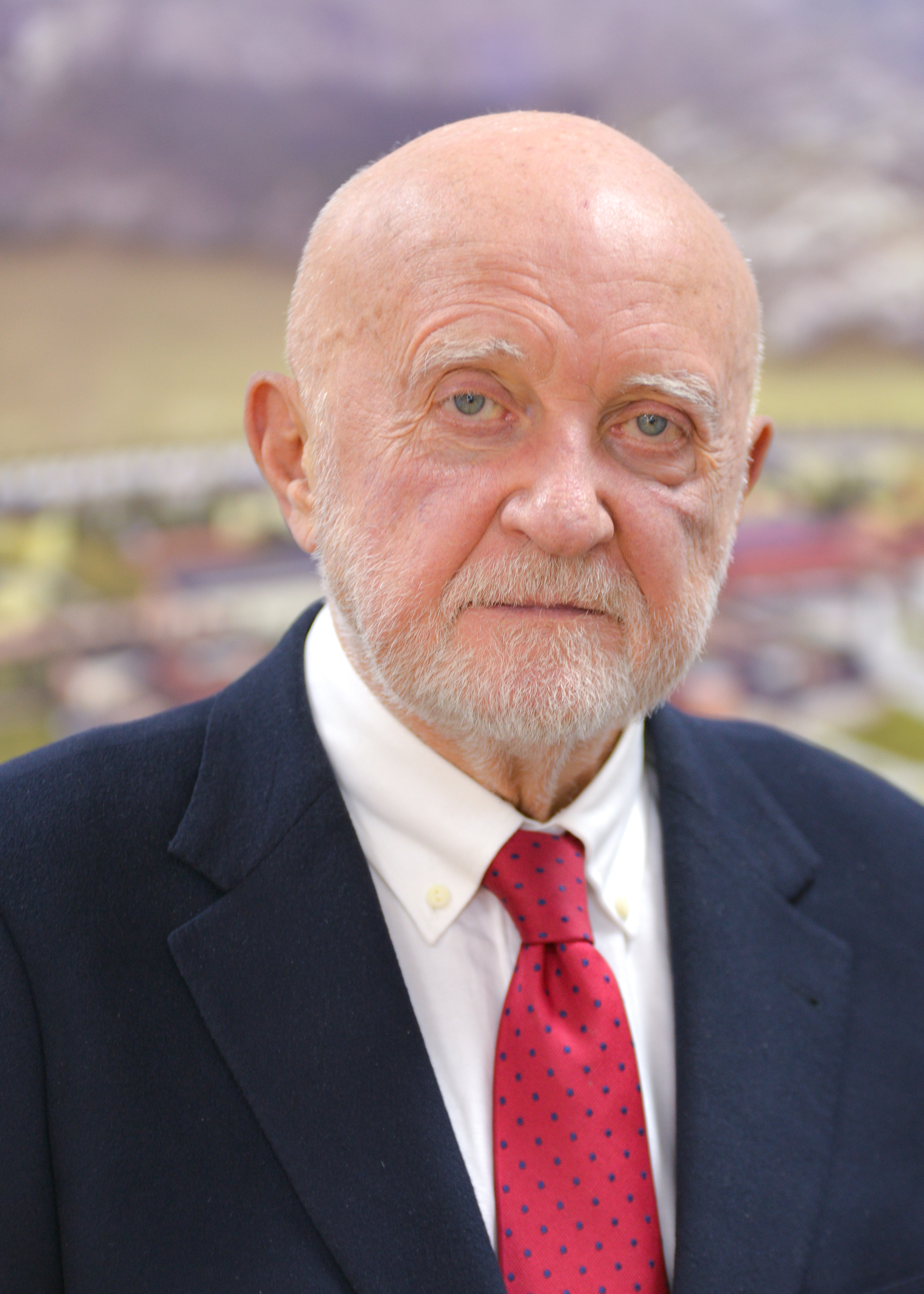
- Bohdan Krawchenko (2022)
- Born: 29 December 1946 (age 79); Günzburg, Germany
- Citizenship: Canada
- Education: Bishop's University University of Toronto University of Glasgow University of Oxford
- Occupations: Historian, political scientist
- Employer: University of Central Asia
- Spouse: Solomiia Pavlychko (died 1999)
- Awards: Order of Merit (Ukraine) Antonovych prize

Bohdan Krawchenko (born 29 December 1946) is a Ukrainian-Canadian historian and academic administrator. He is a Senior Research Fellow at the University of Central Asia (UCA) and formerly served as its Director General. He is also the former director of the Canadian Institute of Ukrainian Studies (CIUS) at the University of Alberta.

== Education and early activism ==
Krawchenko was born in Günzburg, Germany, and emigrated to Canada in 1951. He received his education at Bishop's University, the University of Toronto, and the University of Glasgow, eventually earning a Doctor of Social Sciences from the University of Oxford.

During the late 1960s, Krawchenko was a leading figure in the Union of Ukrainian Students of Canada (SUSK). He was associated with the Ukrainian "New Left" and helped publish the journal Dialog, which sought to bridge the gap between socialist theory and Ukrainian independence.

== Career in Ukraine and Central Asia ==
Following the independence of Ukraine in 1991, Krawchenko moved to Kyiv. He was instrumental in establishing modern administrative structures, serving as the founding Director of the Institute of Public Administration and Local Government, Cabinet of Ministers, and later as the vice-rector of the National Academy for Public Administration, Office of the President. National Academy for Public Administration. For his contributions to the development of the Ukrainian state, he was awarded and Award of Merit by the President of Ukraine in 2000.

In 2004, Krawchenko joined the University of Central Asia, an international institution founded by the governments of Kazakhstan, the Kyrgyz Republic, and Tajikistan, and the Aga Khan Development Network. He is currently a Principal Researcher in the Graduate School of Development and served as the university's Director General from 2007 to 2014.

== Personal life ==
He was the second husband of Solomiia Pavlychko, a pioneering Ukrainian feminist scholar, until her death in 1999.

== Selected publications ==
Social Change and National Consciousness in Twentieth-Century Ukraine (1985)

Ukraine After Shelest (editor, 1983)

Famine in Ukraine, 1932–1933 (co-editor with Roman Serbyn, 1986)

Ukrainian Past, Ukrainian Present (editor, 1993)
