= Tamara Hundorova =

Ukrainian literary critic, culturologist and writer

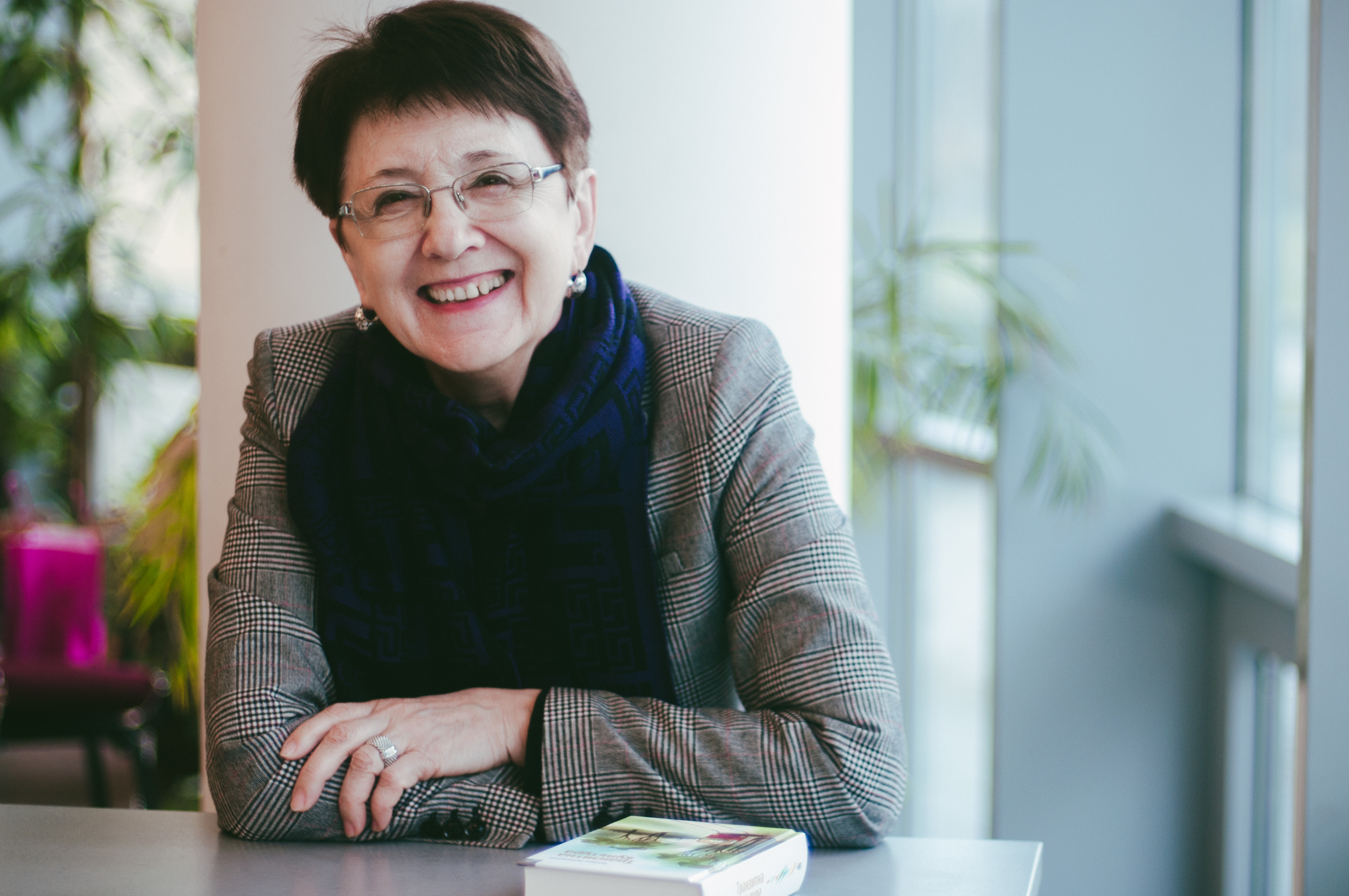
- Tamara Hundorova (2018)
- Born: 17 July 1955 (age 71)
- Citizenship: Ukraine
- Awards: Fulbright Scholar

Tamara Ivanivna Hundorova (Ukrainian: Гундорова Тамара Іванівна; born 17 July 1955, Klymivka, Karlivka Raion, Poltava Oblast) is a Ukrainian literary critic, culturologist and writer. She is a professor and head of the Theory of Literature Department at the Institute of Literature of the National Academy of Sciences of Ukraine, and a professor and dean at the Ukrainian Free University.

On 30 May 2017, she was appointed as a member of the Scientific Committee of the National Council of Ukraine for the Development of Science and Technology by the Cabinet of ministers of Ukraine.

== Biography ==
Hundorova was born on 17 July 1955 in Klymivka, a village in Poltava Oblast in Ukraine.

She graduated from the Department of Ukrainian Language and Literature at Kyiv University, and attended postgraduate studies at the Institute of Literature of the National Academy of Sciences of Ukraine.

Hundorova started working at the Institute of Literature at the National Academy of Sciences of Ukraine in 1981. In September 1990, she, along with Vira Ageyeva, and Natalka Shumylo were invited by Solomiia Pavlychko, a philosophy professor at the University of Kyiv-Mohyla Academy to launch an initiative to found women's studies in Ukraine. They created the "Feminist Seminar" at the Institute of Literature of the National Academy of Sciences. It was the first time the methodology of feminist analysis and gender criticism was introduced in the country. These same women established a feminist section in the academic journal Slovo i Chas (Word and Time) and began publishing works such her article Femina Melancholica: Sex and Culture. The work of these scholars inspired other academics throughout Ukraine to establish women's and gender studies programs.

She taught at the National University of Kyiv-Mohyla Academy from 1994 to 1997 and the University of Toronto in Canada, in 1999. In 2002, she became the head of the National Academy, Institute of Literature's department of literary theory. She also taught the summer school of Harvard University in 2004, and the Ukrainian Free University in 2003 and 2005. In 2009, she was a Yacyk Distinguished Fellow at the Harvard Ukrainian Research Institute and she is the dean of the Ukrainian Free University in Munich. She also taught at the Taras Shevchenko National University of Kyiv from 2005 to 2010, and taught a special course at the Ukrainian Catholic University in Lviv. She has given presentations at international conferences in Ukraine and abroad, as well as lectured at universities in the United States (Yale, Columbia, Harvard), Canada (Universities of Toronto, Alberta, Manitoba), and Great Britain.

Hundorova was an intern at Monash University (Australia) between 1991 and 1992. She also worked at the Harriman Institute at Columbia University in 1997, the Ukrainian Research Institute at Harvard University in 2001, and the Slavic Research Center at Hokkaido University, Japan in 2004.

She was a Fulbright Scholar in the US for the 1998, 2009, and 2011–2012 academic years.

Hundorova's research focuses on feminism, gender studies, literary theory, postcolonial criticism, modernism and postmodernism.

== Public activities ==
In 2002, Hundorova was the vice-president of the International Association of Ukrainians. From 2005 to 2014, she was a member of the Expert Council of the Higher Attestation Commission of Ukraine, and between 2012 and 2014, she was president of the International Association for the Humanities (IAG).

She has also been a member of the editorial and advisory boards of the Journal of Ukrainian Studies, Harvard Ukrainian Studies, Kyiv Antiquity Ukrainian Humanitarian Review, and HELIKON Publishing House, and has been a member of PEN Ukraine.

== Writing ==
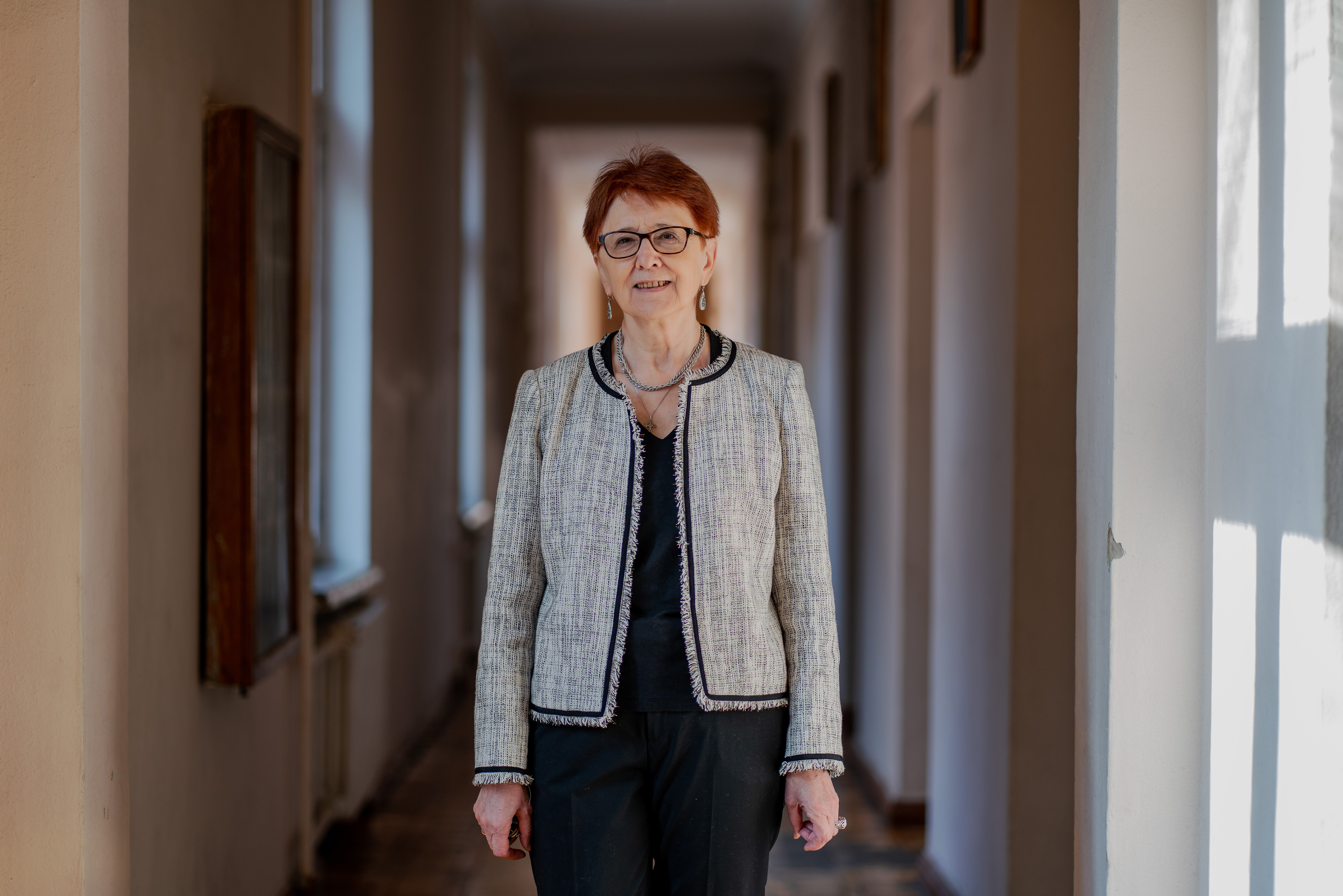
Tamara Hundorova (2021)

Hundorova has written books on modern Ukrainian literature, specifically interpreting works through postmodern, postcolonial, gender, and psychoanalytic theories. Her works focus on the transitions in Ukraine during the early twentieth and twenty-first century. She has written about Ukrainian postmodernism at the turn of the twenty-first century, using the phrase "post-Chernobyl library" as a metaphor, and also has written on subjects of melancholy, popular culture and kitsch.

Her work has been published in the magazines Word and Time (formerly Радянське літературознавство (Soviet Literary Studies)), Krytyka, Modernity, World View, Дивослово, Ї, Kyiv Antiquity, Acta Slavica Japonica, Journal of Ukrainian Studies, Slavia orientalis, Dubrovnik. Casopis za knjizevnost i znanost, Porownania. Komparatystyka i studia postkolonialne. Her work has also been published in the collections Постмодернизм в славянских литературах, Стус як текст, Ukraine in the 1990-s. Proceeding of the First Conference of the Ukraine Studies Association of Australia (Melbourne, 1992), and From Sovietology to Postcoloniality (Stockholm, 2007). She was the author of chapters in Історії української літератури ХХ ст. (English: History of Ukrainian Literature of the 20th Century) (K., 1993).

Reviews of Hundorova's works have been published in the magazines "Critique" (Ukrainian: Критика), "Mirror Weekly", "Книжник-review", "Literary Ukraine", "Неприкосновенный запас", "Slavia – Casopis pro slovanskou filologii", "Journal of Ukrainian Studies", "Wiener Slavistisches Jahrbuch", "Zeitschrift fur Slavische Philologie", and "Canadian Slavonic Papers".

=== Publications ===
- "Ukrainian Euromaidan as Social and Cultural Performance" in the book Revolution and War in Contemporary Ukraine: The Challenge of Change (Stuttgart, 2016)
- "Symptom of the Loser and the Melancholy of Post-Soviet Generation" in the book Eastern European Youth Culture in a Global Context (Palgrave Macmillan, 2016).

=== Monographs ===
- Інтелігенція і народ в повістях Івана Франка 80-х років — Kyiv: Наукова думка, 1985
- Франко і/не Каменяр (English: Franko Not the ‘Stonecutter’ ) — Melbourne: 1996; later edition, 2006
- ПроЯвлення Слова. Дискурсія раннього українського модернізму— Lviv: Літопис, 1997; second edition, 2009
- Femina melancholica. Стать і культура в гендерній утопії Ольги Кобилянської (English: Femina Melancholica: Sex and Culture in Olha Kobylianska's Gender Utopia) — Kyiv: Критика, 2002
- Pisliachornobylska biblioteka (Ukrainian: Післячорнобильська бібліотека) — Kyiv: Критика. — 2005
- Кітч і література.Травестії— Kyiv: Факт, 2008
- ПроЯвлення слова: дискурсія раннього українського модернізму — Вид. друге, перероб. та доп— Kyiv: Критика, 2009.
- Транзитна культура. Симптоми постколоніальної травми: статті та есеї – Kyiv: Грані-Т, 2013

=== Selected papers and essays ===
- Фрідріх Ніцше і український модернізм — Слово і час, 1997. — Number 4, pp. 29–33;
- Europejski modernism czhy europejslie modernizmy? (Z perspektyvy ukrainskiej) in Odkryvanie modernizmu. Przeklady і komentarze. Red. R.Nycha. — Krakow: 1998 — pp. 521–529.
- Методологічний тиск — Критика, 2002 — Parts 12(62), pp. 14–17
- Інтелектуальна дистопія Юрія Луцького in Юрій Луцький. Літературна політика в радянській Україні. 1917—1934 — Кyiv: Гелікон, 2000 — pp. 9–16.
- Жінка і Дзеркало — Ї. Культурологічний журнал, 2000 — No. 17, pp. 87–94.
- У колисці міфу, або топос Києва в літературі українського модернізму — Київська старовина, 2000 — No. 6, pp. 74–82
- Перевернений Рим, або „Енеїда” Котляревського як національний наратив — Сучасність, 2000 — No. 4, pp. 120–134
- Модернізм як еротика „нового” (В. Винниченко і Ст. Пшибишевський) — Слово і час, 2000 — No. 7, pp. 17–25
- Історіографічна формула Григорія Грабовича — Сучасність, 2001. — No. 6, pp. 116–129.
- The Canon Reversed: New Ukrainian Literature of the 1990s — Journal of Ukrainian Studies, 2001 — Volume 26, Number 102, pp. 249–270
- Ольга Кобилянська contra Ніцше, або Народження жінки з духу природи in Гендер і культура. Збірник статей — Kyiv: Факт, 2001 — pp. 34–52;
- „Марлітівський стиль”: жіноче читання, масова література і Ольга Кобилянська in Гендерна перспектива — Kyiv: Факт, 2004 — pp. 19–35
- Соцреалізм як масова культура — Сучасність, 2004 — part 6, pp. 52–66
- „Малоросійський маскарад”: колоніальний дискурс в „Енеїді” Котляревського та навколо неї in На щедрий вечір. Збірник на пошану Євгена Сверстюка — Луцьк, 2004. — pp. 41–65
- Карнавал после Чернобыля (топография украинского постмодернизма) in Постмодернизм в славянских литературах — Moscow: Институт славяноведения, 2004 — pp. 160–190
- The Melancholy of Gender — Acta Slavica Iaponica, 2004 — volume 22, pp. 165–176
- Слідами Адорно: масова культура і кіч — Критика, 2005. — parts 1–2 (87–88). — pp. 32–37
- Нова жінка в Академії наук. Розмова Людмили Таран з Тамарою Гундоровою — Кур'єр Кривбасу, 2005 — No. 185, pp. 169–188
- Жіночий роман — Незнайома. Антологія української „жіночої” прози та есеїстки другої Пол. ХХ — поч. ХХІ ст. Авторський проект Василя Габора. — Lviv: Піраміда, 2005 — pp. 110–115
- Український окциденталізм: бути чи не бути Римом? — Критика, 2006, parts 1–2 (99–100) — pp. 31–36

== Honors and awards ==
Tamara Gundorova was awarded the Honored Worker of Science and Technology of Ukraine in 2006. Her book "Post-Chernobyl Library. Ukrainian Literary Postmodernism" was awarded the All-Ukrainian rating at the Book of the Year in 2005 (nominated under "Literary Criticism and Essays"), and the book "Kitsch and Literature – Travesty" was awarded the All-Ukrainian rating at the Book of the Year in 2008 "(nominated under "Reader – Literary Studies").
