= Kemel Toktomushev =

Kyrgyz scholar

Dr. Kemel Toktomushev is a senior research fellow at University of Central Asia’s Institute of Public Policy and Administration, as well as an assistant professor of political science at UCA’s School of Arts and Sciences. Kemel is one of the youngest people in Kyrgyzstan to have received a PhD.

== Research interests ==
Toktomushev is the author of Kyrgyzstan – Regime Security and Foreign Policy, published by Routledge, United Kingdom. He is also a co-editor of the book The Impact of Mining Lifecycles in Mongolia and Kyrgyzstan: Political, Social, Environmental and Cultural Contexts.

Toktomushev was one of the scholars who studied the political and economic arrangements required to sustain the Manas Air Base in Kyrgyzstan, which was used by the US military to supply their forces in Afghanistan.

Toktomushev has frequently provided political analysis, and his commentaries have been featured in BBC, The Diplomat, SCMP, and China US Focus.

Toktomushev is currently studying the impacts of COVID-19 on communities in Mongolia and Kyrgyzstan as part of a joint project with the University of Oxford.

== Education ==
Toktomushev holds a PhD in Politics from the University of Exeter, a Master of Science in International Relations from the London School of Economics, and is also an alumnus of the Harvard Kennedy School’s Executive Education program.
