= Shamsh Kassim-Lakha =

Pakistani politician

- Occupation: Chairman of the Board of Trustees of the University of Central Asia

Shamsh Kassim-Lakha' is a Pakistani businessman, politician, and educational leader. He led the planning, building, and operation of the University of Central Asia (UCA), a regional institution founded by the Presidents of Kazakhstan, Kyrgyzstan, Tajikistan and His Highness the Aga Khan with campuses in the mountain areas of the three countries. He was the Diplomatic Representative of the Aga Khan Development Network in the Kyrgyz Republic from 2014-2017. He is currently Senior Advisor, Aga Khan Foundation Canada, in which capacity he is Chairman of the Board of Trustees of the University of Central Asia and advises the Foundation on its work in Central and South Asia as well as Eastern Africa.

== Aga Khan University ==
Shamsh's academic career began as Founding President of the Aga Khan University (AKU), the first university to be chartered in the private sector in South Asia. As President, he guided AKU for 27 years in eight countries of Asia, Africa, and the United Kingdom. He also led the University's fundraising campaigns, generating over $350 million from private donors, corporations, foundations, and aid agencies.

== Organisational and philanthropic activity ==
He has chaired or served on government commissions and boards of business, professional and research organizations in such diverse fields as government reforms, public sector pay and pensions reforms, higher education reforms, school education, health, finance, banking, energy, environmental protection and climate change. Shamsh was Pakistan's Federal Minister for Education and for Science and Technology in 2007-2008. He has played pioneering roles in promoting civil society activities, principal among them as Founding Chair of the Pakistan Centre for Philanthropy (PCP). He sat on the worldwide board of the International Baccalaureate Organization, as well as the Steering Committee of the Talloires Network of over 300 universities involved in civic engagement and based at Tufts University, USA. Shamsh was an honorary member of the Pakistan Business Council, an association of 40 of the largest national and multinational corporations in Pakistan and chaired its Education Panel. He has advised and consulted on policy and strategy with selected civil society organizations including the Grameen Bank for their health initiatives, and the World Bank on higher education. He is also a member of the Steering Committee of the Aga Khan Music Awards.

In 1997, Shamsh co-chaired with the Education Minister of Tajikistan the Commission on the Establishment of the University of Central Asia and later helped negotiate the International Treaty and Charter of this institution. During the same period, he chaired the Committee that developed consensus among government, civil society, and industry on key elements of Pakistan's environmental protection laws and drafted the country's National Environment Protection Act (1997). In 2001-2, as Minister of State, he led the government of Pakistan's Task Force on Higher Education Reforms.

== Awards and recognition ==
He has received national awards, Sitara-e-Imtiaz and Hilal-e-Imtiaz from the President of Pakistan and Officier de l’Ordre National du Mérite (National Order of Merit (France)) from the President of France, as well as honorary degrees from McMaster University and the Aga Khan University.

== See also ==
- Aga Khan Development Network website
- UCA official website
