= BBC News Ukrainian =

Ukrainian service of the BBC

BBC News Україна BBC News Ukraine
- Type: Radio network and website
- Country: United Kingdom
- Availability: International
- Endowment: Foreign and Commonwealth Office, UK
- Owner: BBC
- Key people: Maciek Bernatt-Reschynskyy (Head of Service)
- Launch date: 1992
- Official website: www.bbc.com/ukrainian

BBC News Ukrainian (Ukrainian: BBC News Україна) is the Ukrainian service of BBC News which conveys the latest political, social, economical and sport news relevant to Ukraine and the world. It started broadcasts in 1992. Its headquarters are in London, United Kingdom. The first BBC Ukrainian program was aired on 1 June 1992. It featured President of Ukraine Leonid Kravchuk and UK Prime Minister John Major. It has had an office in Kyiv since 1993 with around ten staff, in 1993 the office was staffed by one correspondent. BBC Ukrainian has a few dozen reporters - both in Ukraine and abroad.

From June 2009 BBC Ukrainian aired hourly news broadcasts outside its morning and evening broadcasts. Radio broadcasts ceased on 29 April 2011, leaving only Internet publication.

== Programs ==
"Morning with the BBC" and "Good evening from London" were two of the most popular programmes broadcast directly from the British capital and from Kyiv, the latter was interactive. On Fridays BBC editors invited guests, well known people in Ukraine, who were specialists in various fields: politicians, analysts, scientists etc. "Morning with the BBC" started at 6 a.m. Kyiv time on weekdays and was broadcast for one hour by Radio Era and other partner stations. It was on air on ultra-short waves in Kharkiv and Kyiv regions.

In 2022, following the Russian invasion, the BBC launched a 30-minute daily TV news bulletin. On the first week of the Russian invasion, BBC News Ukraine reached a record audience of 5.6 million people across bbc.ua and various social media platforms. Over the following two months, the service has maintained a weekly digital audience that is more than double its average for the previous years.

== BBC Ukraine staff ==
- Olha Burda, has started her career as a teacher, she has worked in Donetsk Oblast. She has worked at the leading Ukrainian newspapers and TV channels, and then she became a radio journalist.
- Oleksandr Bondarenko, has a Diploma in Ukrainian philology, graduate of Luhansk Pedagogical University, worked at several Ukrainian TV channels.
- Svitlana Dorosh, is the chief correspondent of BBC-Kyiv office, obtained a degree in journalism at the Taras Shevchenko National University of Kyiv, she worked in the editors offices of Kyiv newspapers, information agencies and radio stations.
- Anastasiia Zanuda is an economist, graduated from Kyiv Institute of National Economy, yet had worked as a translator, and then mastered journalist's skills.
- Oles Konoshevych is an international lawyer, graduated from the International Relations Department, Kyiv National University
- Lubomyr Krupnytskyy is a historian by qualification, graduated from Ternopil Pedagogical University. Yet, has a very vast professional experience as a journalist. Before joining the BBC service he worked as a correspondent for a number of well-known Ukrainian newspapers.
- Svitlana Pyrkalo, is the producer of the Ukrainian Service, writer, journalist
- Roman Lebed was the youngest journalist at BBC-Ukraine, graduated from Lviv State University, before joining BBC he had worked at the local radio in Rivne
- Olha Makarchuk, has a degree of translator of English and German languages. She worked on television and radio, was correspondent for BBC Ukrainian Service in Germany
- Marta Shokalo, is a graduate of University of Kyiv-Mohyla Academy, with a degree in philosophy, worked at BBC-Ukraine as a journalist
- Olga Malchevska is a producer and presenter. She collected the Public Service Journalism award at the British Journalism Awards 2022 for reporting on the Russian war in Ukraine among 100+ journalists [9]. Awarded for the Best Interview of the Year in Ukraine by the Honor of Profession («Честь Професії») - Kyiv, 2020. [10] Before joining the BBC, Olga was awarded with the international Vaclav Havel Fellowship for outstanding journalists, representing Ukraine, and directed an investigative documentary Kremlin's Czech Friends. Prior to that Ms Malchevska worked as a Correspondent for the leading Ukrainian TV Channel of 1+1 TV ( 1+1 Media) and its accoladed flagship weekly current affairs program ТСН-Тиждень (TSN-Week). She had also worked as a reporter and news editor for other Ukrainian TV channels including Channel 5, Novyi Kanal, TRK Ukraine.
