= Naryn =

Naryn Нарын
- City
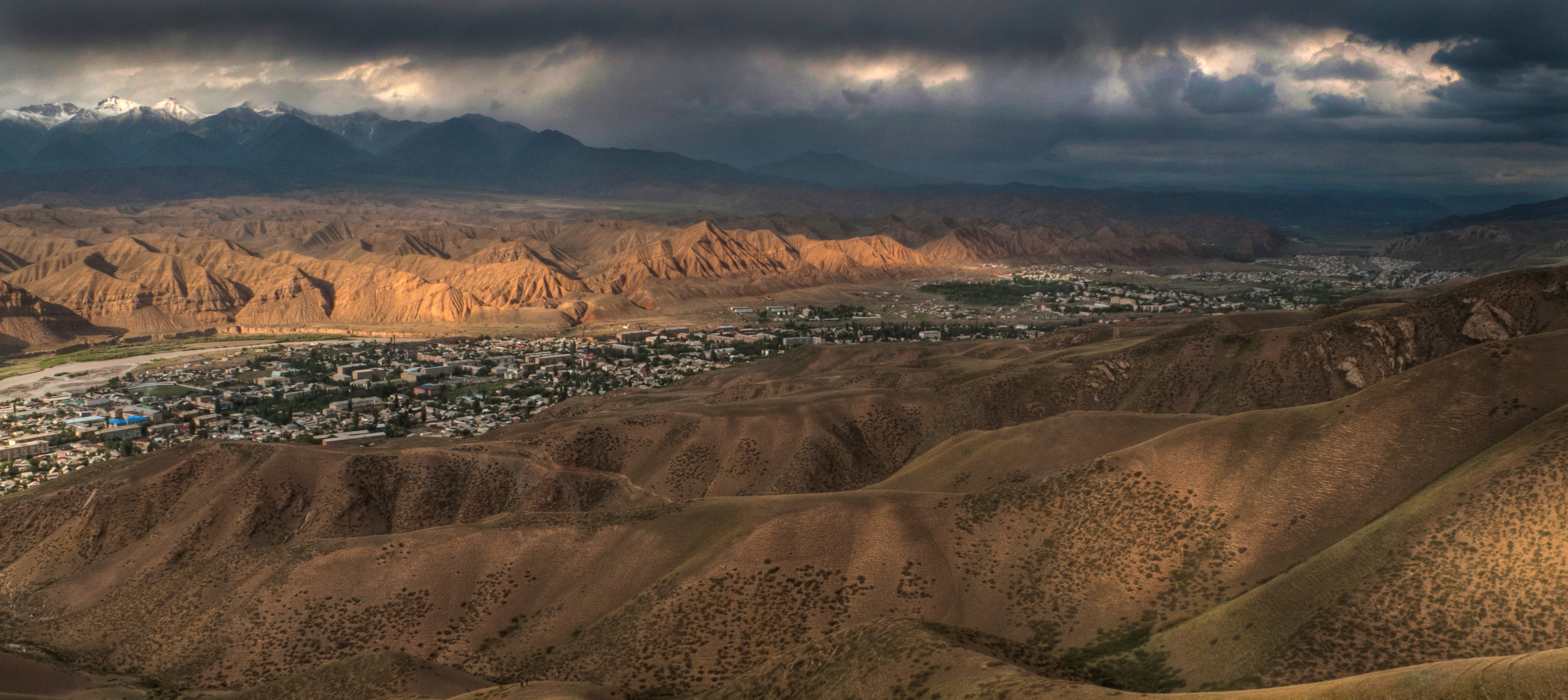
- Overlook of Naryn from the south

- Flag Seal

- Location in Kyrgyzstan
- Coordinates: 41°26′N 76°0′E
- Country: Kyrgyzstan
- Region: Naryn Region
- Founded: 1868

Government
  - Mayor: Kanbolot Tutuev

Area
  - Total: 84 km^{2} (32 sq mi)
- Elevation: 2,044 m (6,706 ft)

Population (2023)
  - Total: 41,988
  - Rank: 9th
  - Density: 500/km^{2} (1,300/sq mi)
- Time zone: UTC+6 (KGT)
- 722900: 722600
- Area code: 722600

Naryn (/nəˈrɪn/ nə-RIN; Kyrgyz: Нарын [nɑˈɾɯn]) is the regional administrative center of Naryn Region in central Kyrgyzstan. Its area is 84 square kilometres (32 sq mi), and its estimated population was 41,178 as of January 2021. The town was established as a fortress on the caravan route in 1868. It is situated on both banks of the river Naryn (one of the main headwaters of the Syr Darya), which cuts a picturesque gorge through the town. The city has two regional museums and some hotels, but is otherwise residential.

== History ==
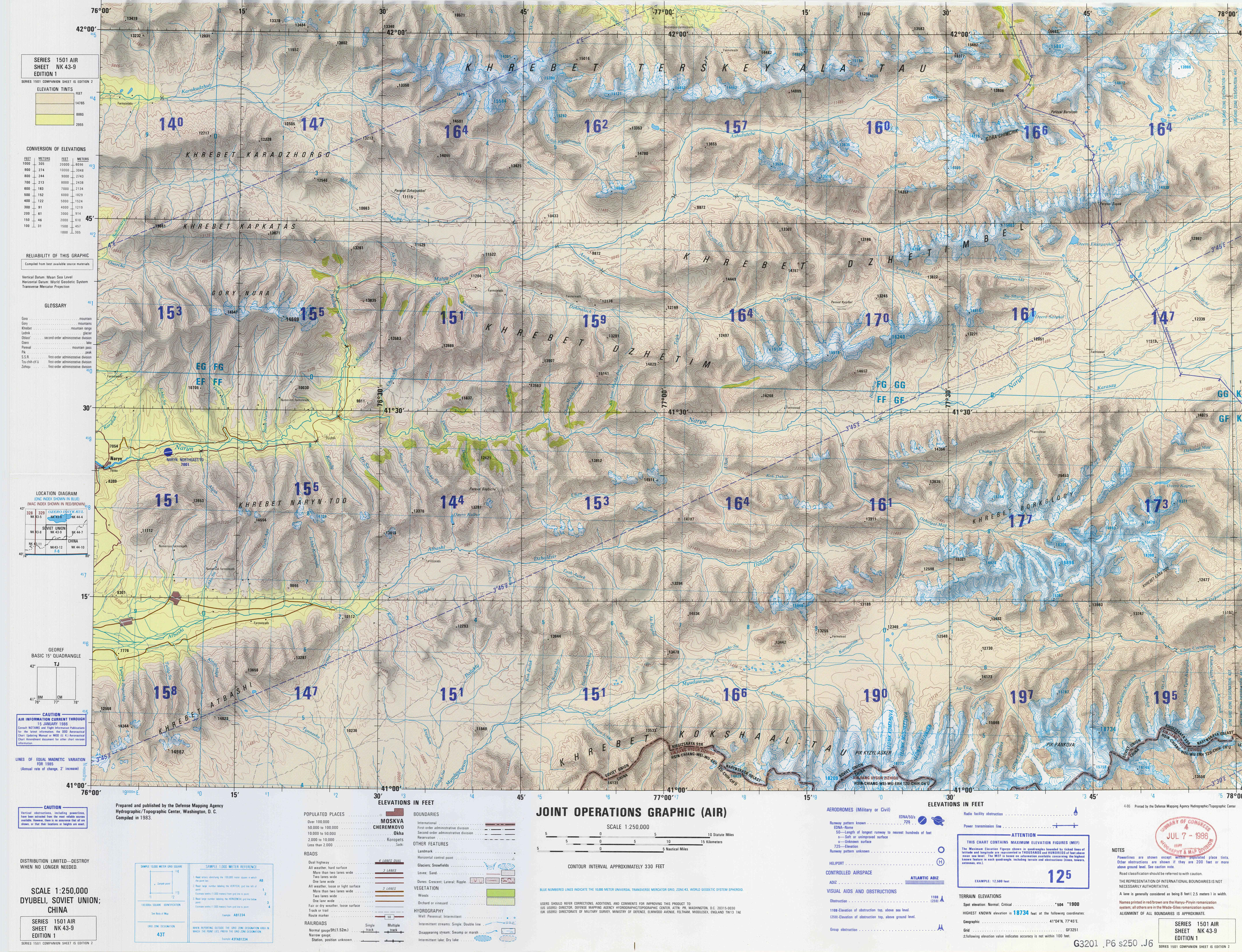
Map including Naryn (DMA, 1983)

Naryn was established as a fortress on the important caravan route between Kashgar and Zhetysu (Semirechye) at the direction of the first Governor-General of Russian Turkestan Konstantin Petrovich von Kaufmann in 1868.

== Overview ==
From Naryn, the main road (one of the branches of the ancient Silk Road) runs south through the sparsely settled central Kyrgyz highlands to the Torugart Pass and China. At present, this is the main transport link from Kyrgyzstan to China. Naryn hosts one of three campuses of the University of Central Asia (UCA). The university was founded in 2000 by the governments of Kazakhstan, the Kyrgyz Republic and Tajikistan, and His Highness the Aga Khan. It is the world's first internationally chartered institution of higher education. The UCA currently operates a School of Professional and Continuing Education (SPCE), with a School of Undergraduate Studies and a Graduate School of Development in the process of being established. Undergraduate classes at the University of Central Asia’s (UCA) Naryn, Kyrgyz Republic campus commenced on 5 September 2016.

The city has a bandy club.

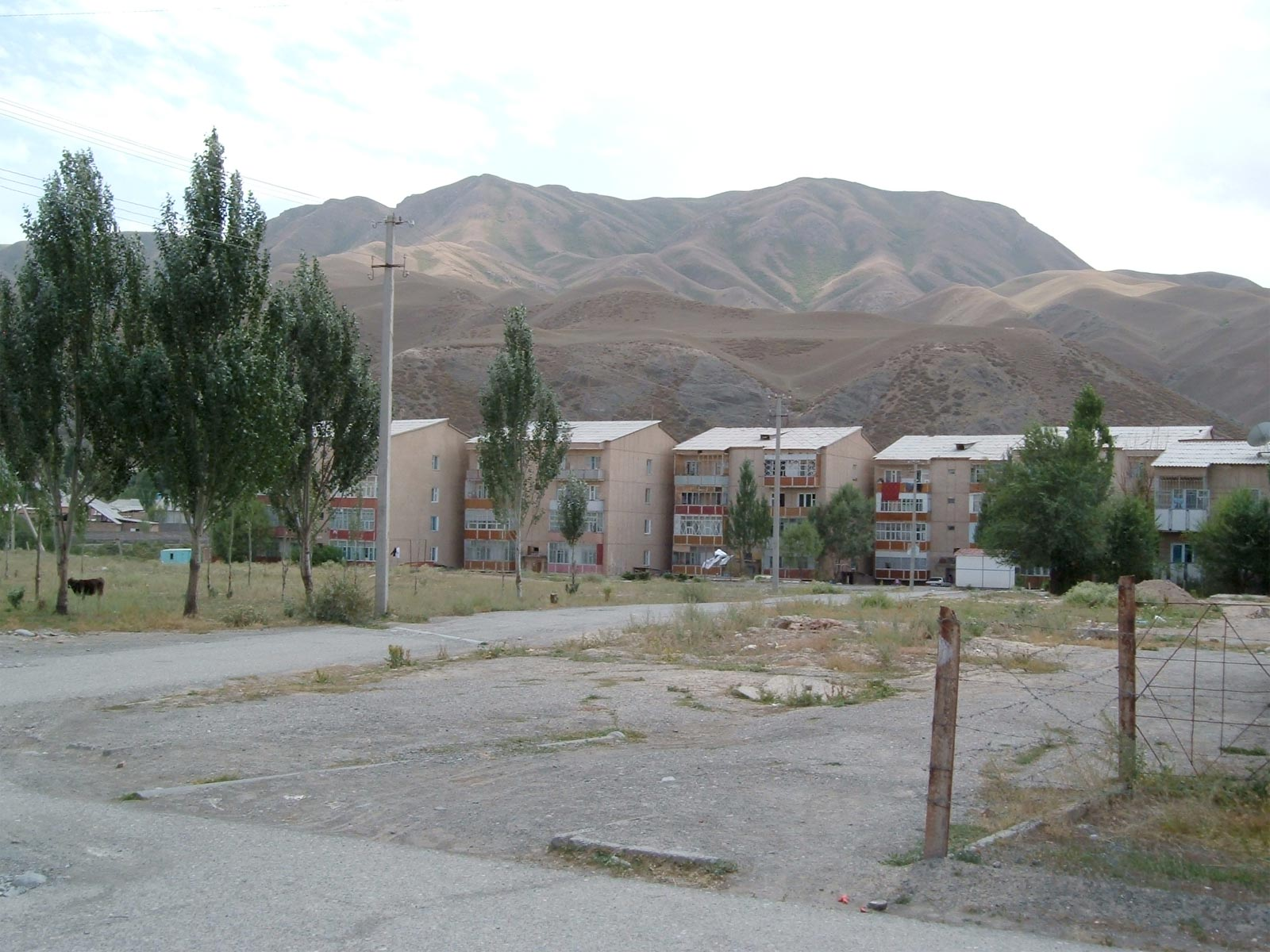
Apartment buildings in Naryn

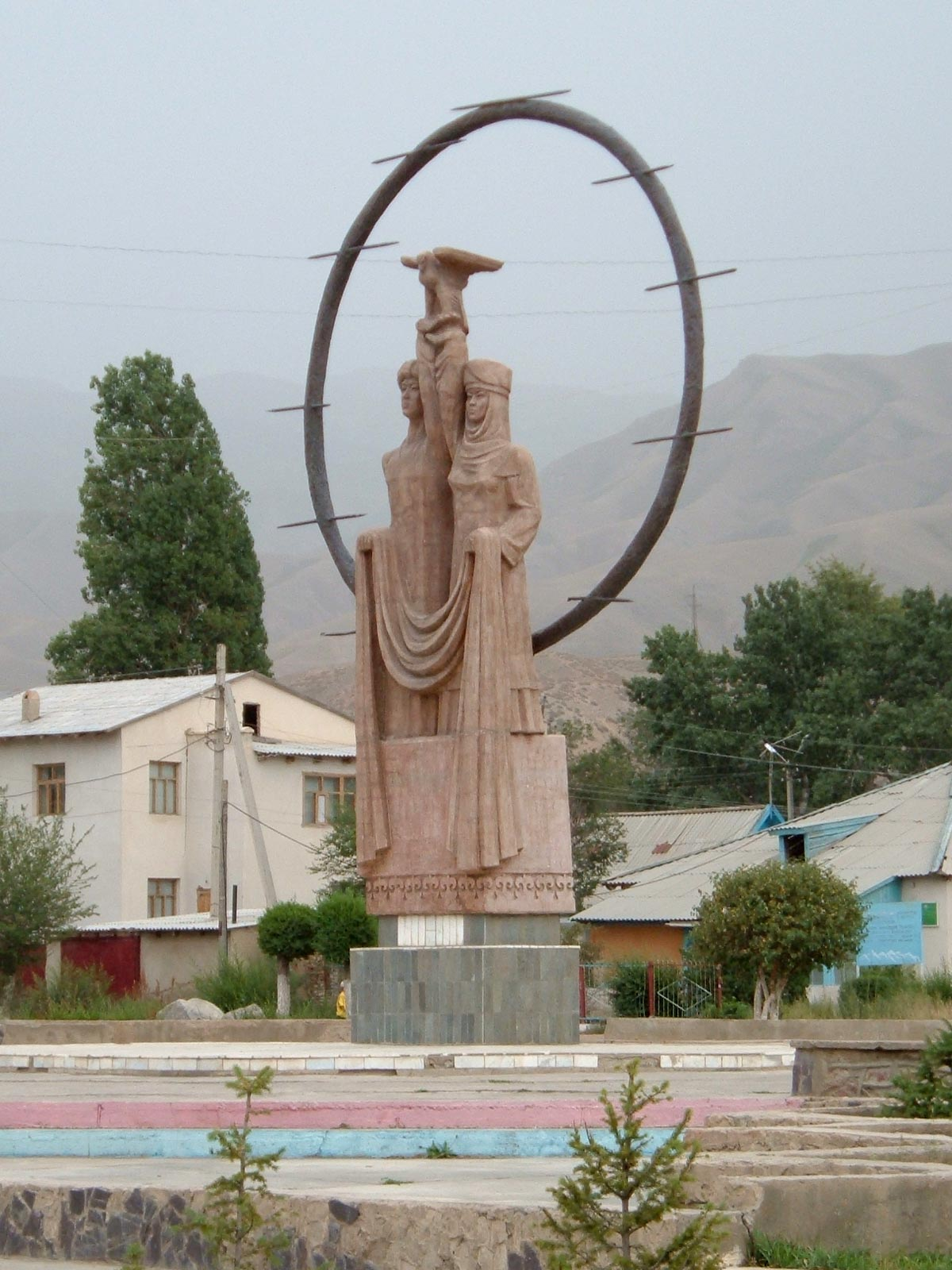
Statue in the main square of Naryn

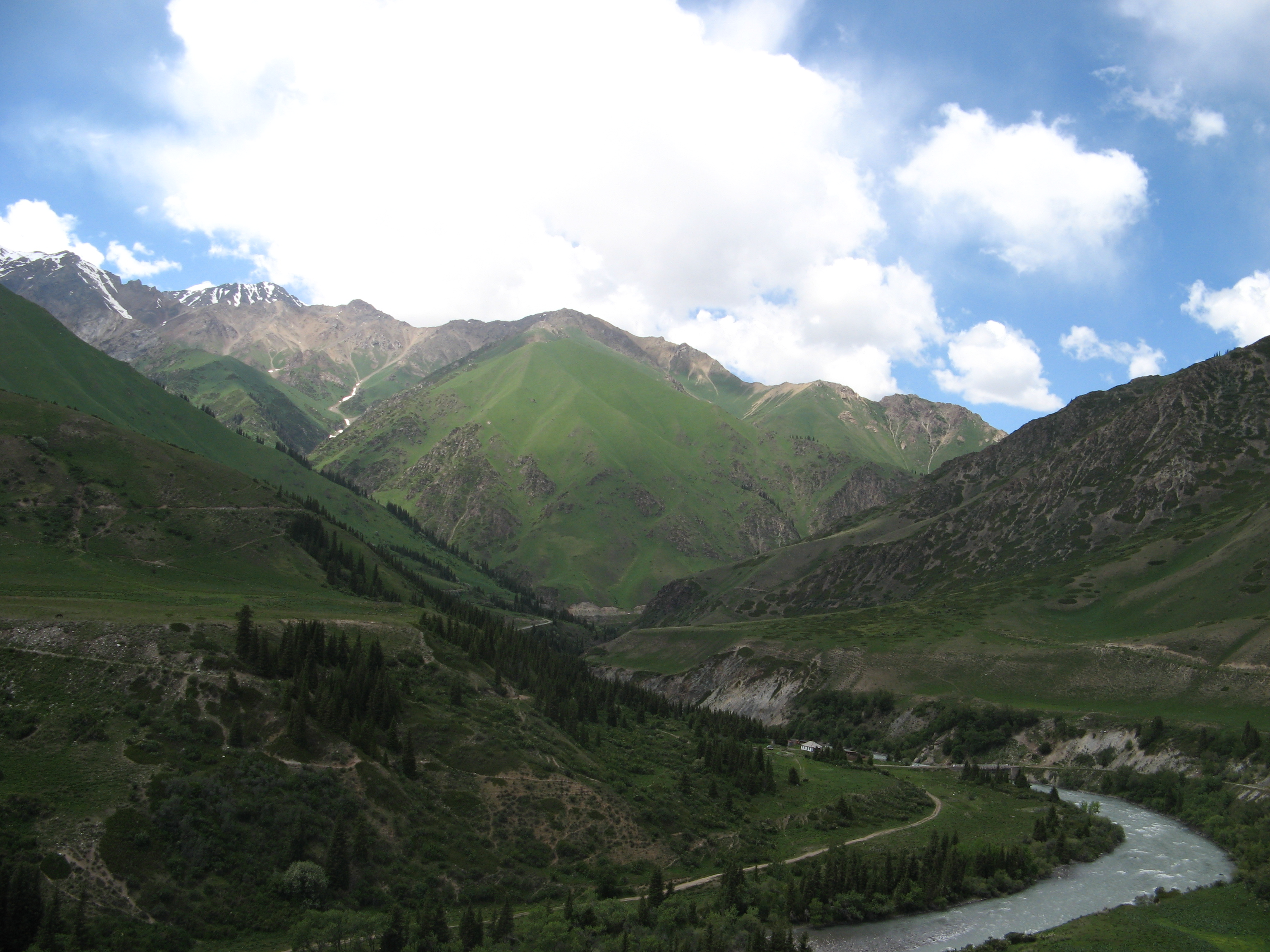
Countryside around Naryn.

Historical populations in Naryn
Year	Pop.	±% p.a.
1926	1,632	—
1959	6,033	+4.04%
1970	20,836	+11.93%
1979	29,833	+4.07%
1989	42,210	+3.53%
1999	40,050	−0.52%
2009	34,822	−1.39%
2021	41,178	+1.41%
2023	41,988	+0.98%

== Demographics ==
Naryn is the tenth largest city by population in Kyrgyzstan. Its resident population, according to the Population and Housing Census of 2009, was 34,822. According to the National Statistical Committee the population of Naryn amounted to 41,178 as of January 2021.

== Economics ==
The economy of the Province is dominated by animal husbandry such as horse, sheep and yak, and wool and meat being the main products. Today, the district is the poorest region in the country. The mineral mines developed during the Soviet period were largely abandoned after the fall of communism as they were not profitable.

== Climate ==
Naryn has a cold semi-arid climate (Köppen climate classification BSk) with strong continental tendencies.

Climate data for Naryn (1991–2020, extremes 1913–present)
Month	Jan	Feb	Mar	Apr	May	Jun	Jul	Aug	Sep	Oct	Nov	Dec	Year
Record high °C (°F)	5.3 (41.5)	9.1 (48.4)	20.5 (68.9)	29.5 (85.1)	29.6 (85.3)	33.1 (91.6)	36.9 (98.4)	36.0 (96.8)	31.4 (88.5)	26.6 (79.9)	19.0 (66.2)	9.0 (48.2)	36.9 (98.4)
Mean daily maximum °C (°F)	−8.7 (16.3)	−5.0 (23.0)	4.4 (39.9)	14.4 (57.9)	18.7 (65.7)	22.0 (71.6)	25.3 (77.5)	25.4 (77.7)	21.5 (70.7)	13.6 (56.5)	4.8 (40.6)	−5.7 (21.7)	10.9 (51.6)
Daily mean °C (°F)	−14.8 (5.4)	−11.0 (12.2)	−1.1 (30.0)	8.1 (46.6)	12.1 (53.8)	15.2 (59.4)	17.8 (64.0)	17.7 (63.9)	13.8 (56.8)	6.4 (43.5)	−1.5 (29.3)	−11.4 (11.5)	4.3 (39.7)
Mean daily minimum °C (°F)	−19.4 (−2.9)	−15.9 (3.4)	−5.9 (21.4)	2.3 (36.1)	6.1 (43.0)	8.8 (47.8)	10.6 (51.1)	10.3 (50.5)	6.5 (43.7)	0.8 (33.4)	−5.9 (21.4)	−15.7 (3.7)	−1.4 (29.4)
Record low °C (°F)	−37.9 (−36.2)	−38.0 (−36.4)	−27.6 (−17.7)	−15.5 (4.1)	−5.7 (21.7)	−1.0 (30.2)	0.6 (33.1)	0.6 (33.1)	−7.4 (18.7)	−14.9 (5.2)	−29.2 (−20.6)	−35.4 (−31.7)	−38.0 (−36.4)
Average precipitation mm (inches)	9 (0.4)	11 (0.4)	21 (0.8)	33 (1.3)	54 (2.1)	51 (2.0)	38 (1.5)	22 (0.9)	14 (0.6)	17 (0.7)	16 (0.6)	12 (0.5)	339 (13.3)
Average precipitation days (≥ 1.0 mm)	3.1	5.8	5.6	6.8	9.4	10.0	7.2	4.4	3.3	3.3	3.3	2.7	62.9
Average relative humidity (%)	76	74	71	60	54	57	55	50	45	52	63	74	61
Mean monthly sunshine hours	135	145	178	210	246	292	320	316	274	218	156	122	2,612
Source 1: Pogoda.ru.net
Source 2: Deutscher Wetterdienst (humidity 1961–1990) NOAA (precipitation days and sun 1961–1990)
