= Klymivka, Poltava Oblast =

Village in Poltava Raion of Ukraine

Klymivka Климівка
- Village
- Location within Poltava Oblast Location within Ukraine
- Coordinates: 49°19′16″N 35°7′41″E
- Country: Ukraine
- Oblast: Poltava
- Raion: Poltava Raion
- Postal code: 39532
- ISO 3166 code: UA-53

Klymivka is a village in Poltava Raion of Poltava Oblast of Ukraine. It belongs to Lanna rural hromada, one of the hromadas of Ukraine. Their local government body is called the Klymivka Village Council.

== Geography ==
The village of Klymivka is located on the left bank of the Orchyk river. Three kilometers upstream is the village of Fedorivka (Fedorivka, Lanna rural hromada, Poltava Raion, Poltava Oblast) and downstream is the village of Novoselivka (Novoselivka, Zachepylivka settlement hromada, Poltava Raion, Poltava Oblast). A drying stream with a dam flows through the village.

== History ==
The village was founded in the mid-18th century. The earliest recorded mention of the village was in 1775, when it was referred to as the "Klimovka suburb at the Bronyevskaya mill" (Original: "слободка Климовка при мельницѣ Бронѣевской"). In the 18th century, the settlement belonged to the Protovchanska Palanka territory.

It later became part of the Konstantinogradsky Uyezd of the Poltava Governorate in the Russian Empire. In 1885, the village's population was 1827 people and there were 364 farmsteads, an Orthodox church, school, chapel, 27 windmills, and 2 fairs a year.

According to the 1897 census, the population grew to 2,722 (1,351 males and 1,371 females), of whom 2,715 were Orthodox.

Until 18 July 2020, Pirky belonged to Karlivka Raion. The raion was abolished in July 2020 as part of the administrative reform of Ukraine, which reduced the number of raions of Poltava Oblast to four. The area of Karlivka Raion was merged into Poltava Raion.

== Notable people ==
- Tamara Hundorova - Ukrainian literary critic and culturologist
