= Tekeli, Kazakhstan =

Tekeli Текелі
- Town
- Seal

- Location in Kazakhstan
- Coordinates: 44°49′48″N 78°49′26″E
- Country: Kazakhstan
- Region: Jetisu Region
- Established: 1930s

Government
  - Akim: Almas Gabdulovich Adil

Area
  - Total: 39 sq mi (100 km^{2})

Population (2019)
  - Total: 31,958
- Time zone: UTC+6 (ALMT)
- Postal code: 041700
- Area code: 72835
- Website: http://tekeli.zhetysu.gov.kz

The Tekeli (Kazakh: Текелі, Tekelı) is a city in the Jetisu Region of Kazakhstan, located 310 km from Almaty and 40 km from Taldykorgan. At the beginning of 2019, the population of the city was 31,958.

== History ==
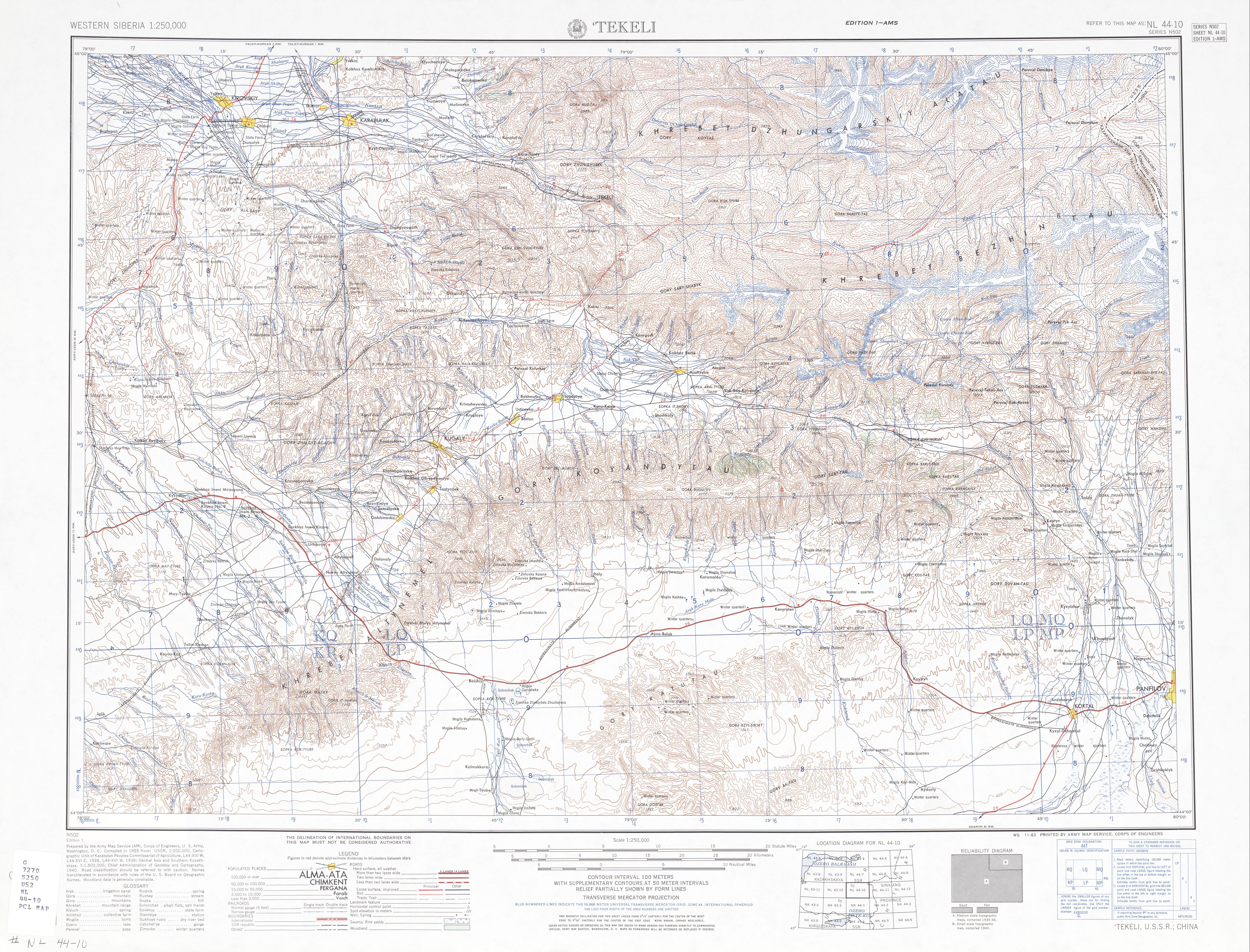
'Tekeli (1955)

Determination and further development of Tekeli started in the 1920s when Dzhungar Survey Expedition revealed rich mineral deposits near the future town location.

In 1927, there began a more structured search for deposits of minerals in the Dzungarian Alatau Mountains. In 1933 a deposit of polimetals such as lead, zinc, silver, cadmium and germanium was discovered. In 1939, construction of the Tekeli Lead-Zinc Factory began. Concurrently, development of a settlement was started for the miners which would become the future town of Tekeli. The development and life of the city depended on the "Lead-Zinc industrial complex", which was one of the largest in the USSR. During the Second World War, this deposit gave the country lead for every eighth bullet. Later, in the post-war period, Tekeli began to grow, the construction of residential buildings was declared a shock construction site, and a stream of volunteers arrived from all over the Soviet Union. Homes and industrial facilities were built not only by visiting builders, but also by Japanese prisoners of the Second World War. In 1952, Tekeli was granted city status and was incorporated on January 29, 1952, by the decree of the Kazakh Soviet Republic Presidium.

The name of the city comes from the species of animals that once lived in abundance in the gorges of these rivers: Teke - mountain goat, skiff - a small antelope. Hunting scenes of the Uisun tribes depicted on rock paintings near the city. The city of the Tekeli is located in the upper reaches of the Karatal River in the foothills of the Dzungar Alatau, at the confluence of the Kora (Karoy, karinka), Chazhi (Chizhi, Chizhinka) and Tekelinka rivers. The city also had the only electrified narrow-gauge railway in Kazakhstan, which was dismantled in the early 2000s.

Tekeli has been subject to conflicts between the government and Krishna believers in recent years.

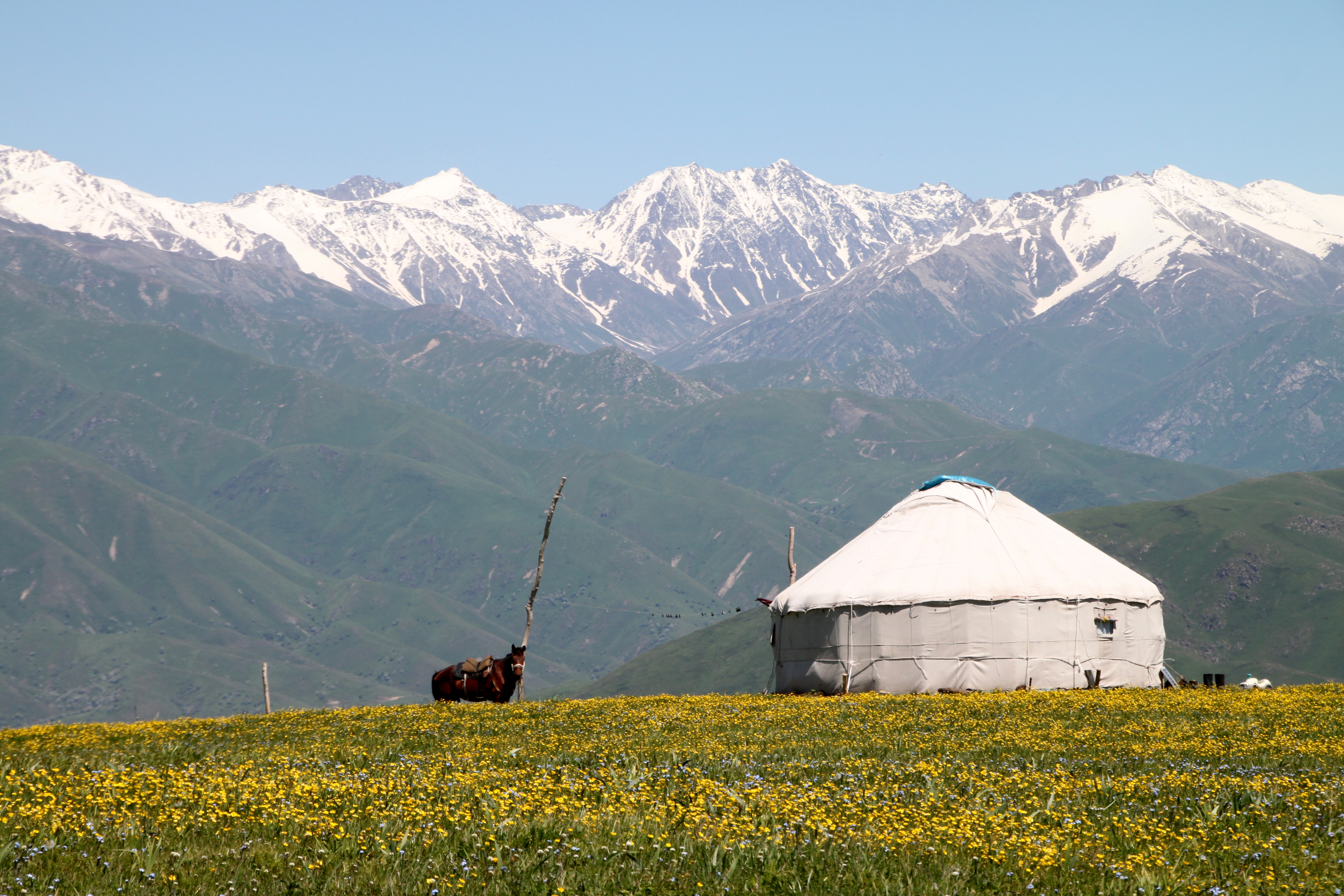
Yurt in Tekeli

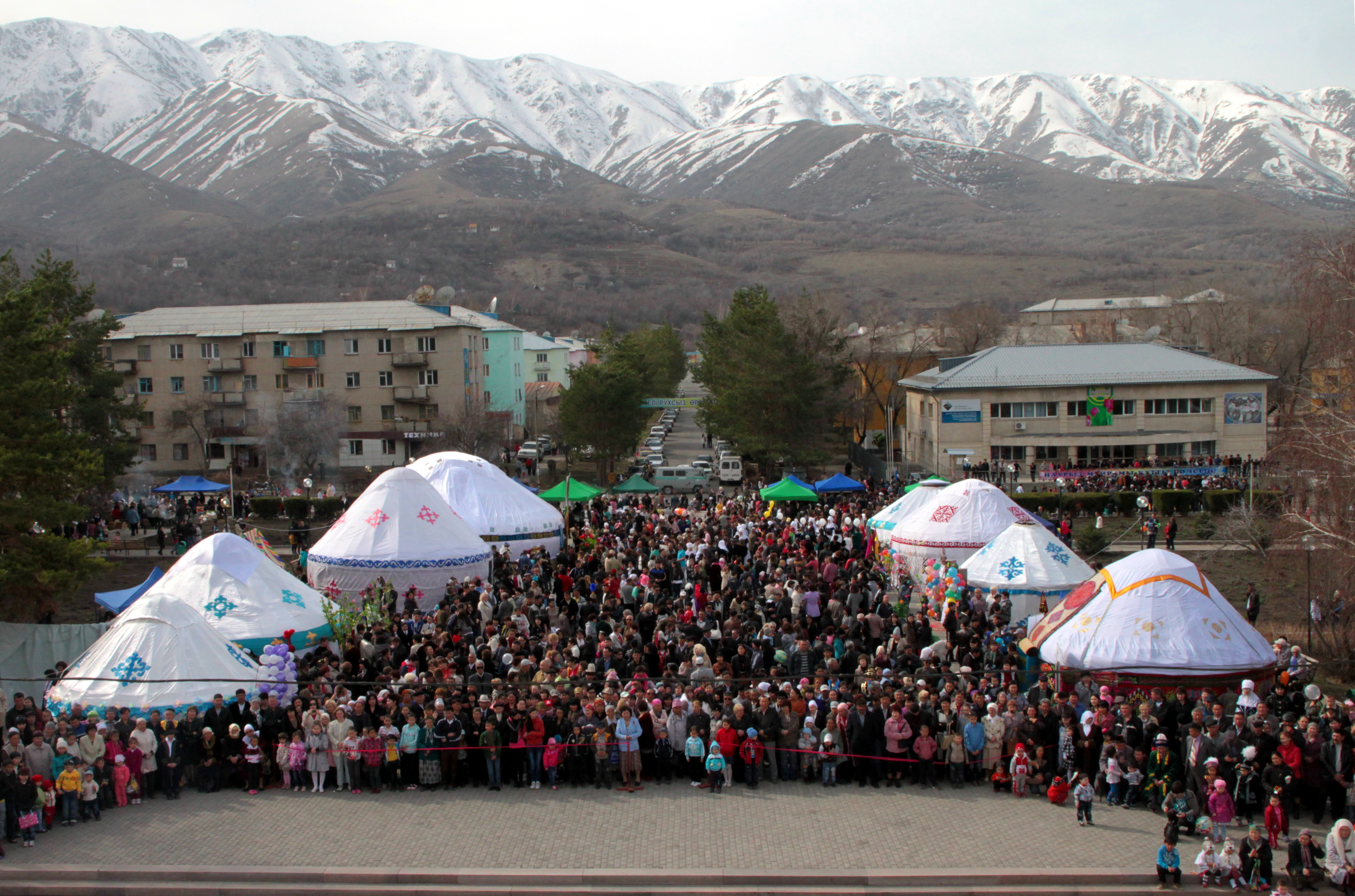
Nowruz in 2013

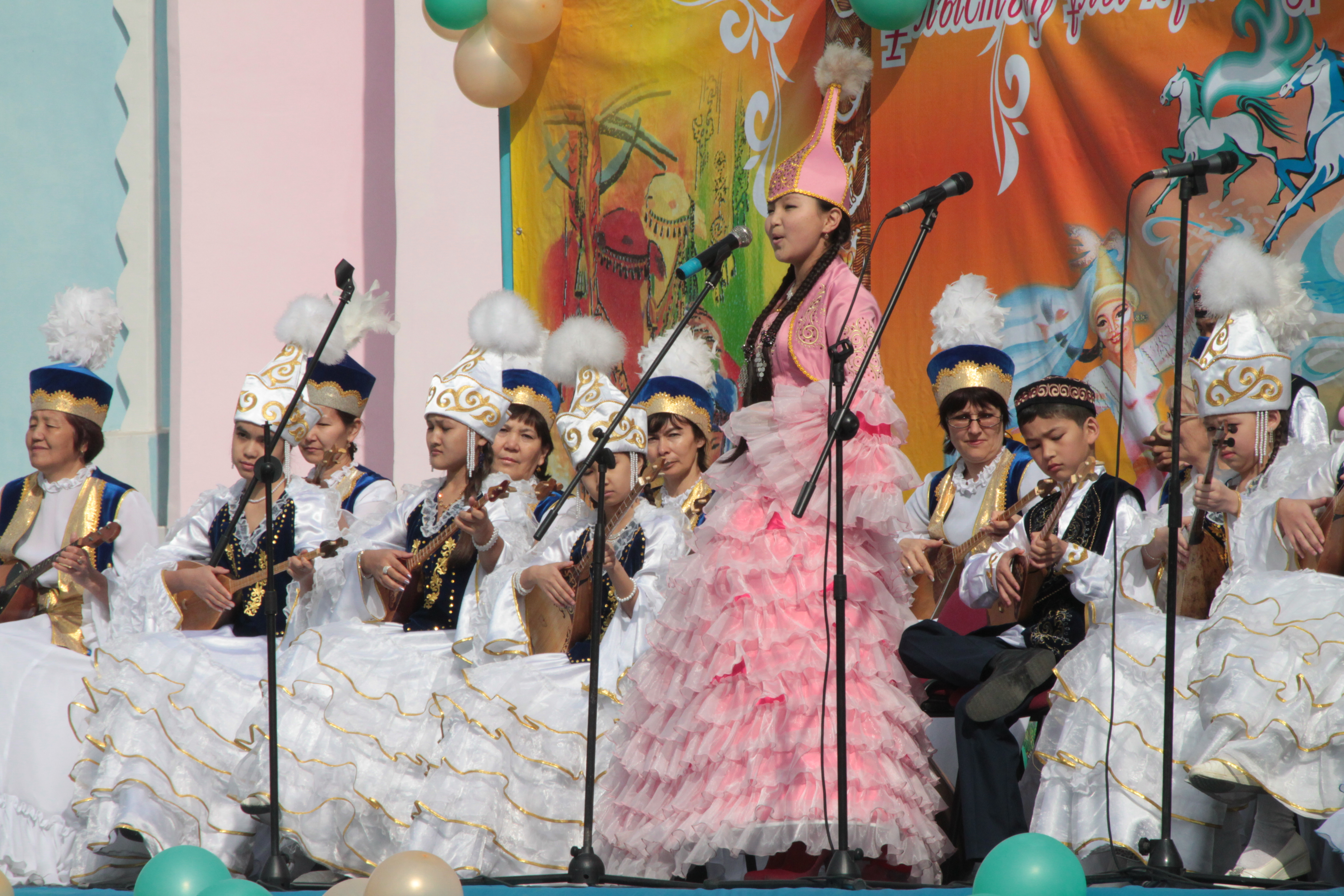
Nowruz in 2013

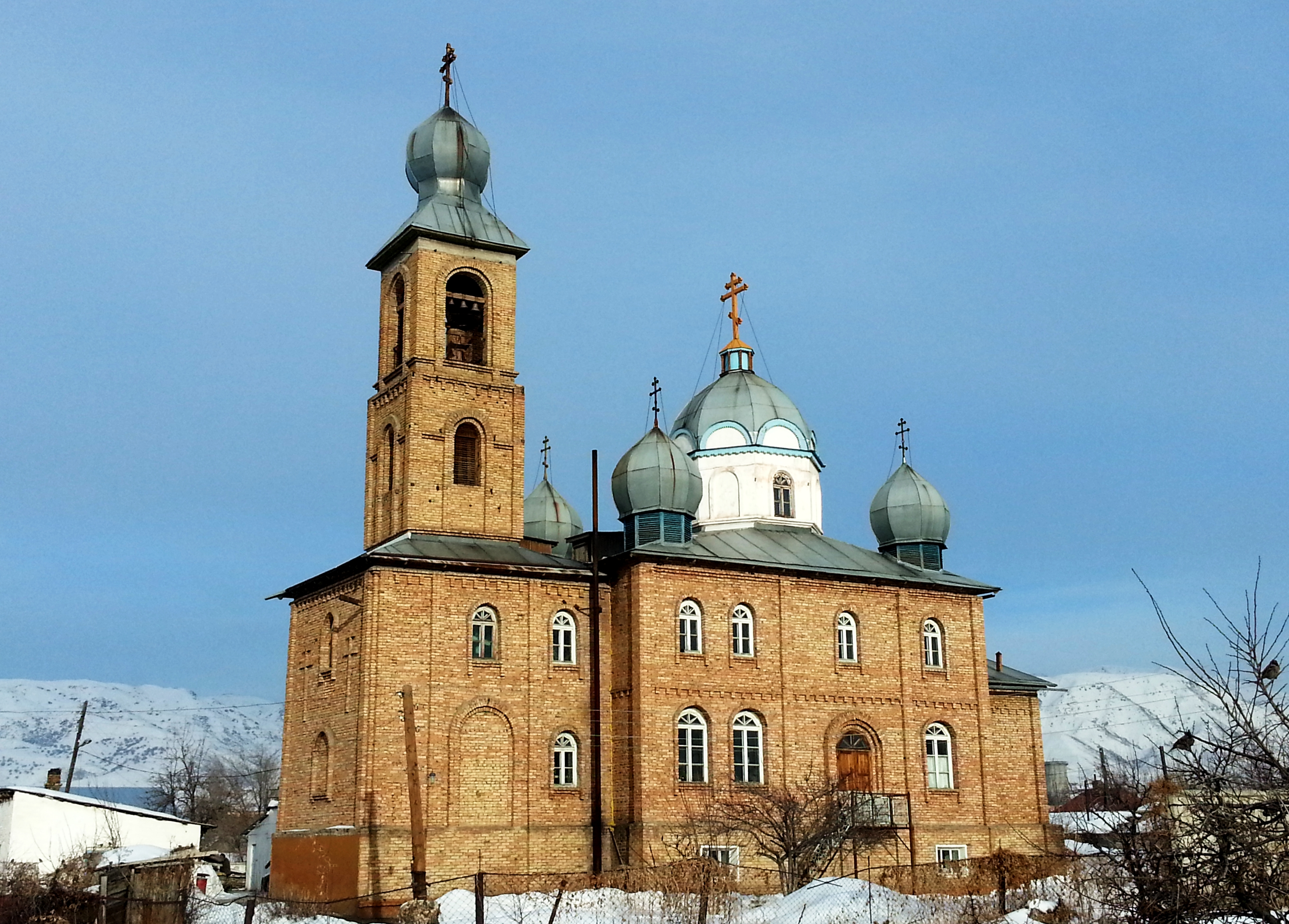
Orthodox church

== Education ==
Tekeli will host one of the three campuses of the University of Central Asia (UCA) founded in 2000 by the governments of Kazakhstan, the Kyrgyz Republic and Tajikistan, and His Highness the Aga Khan. It is the world's first internationally chartered institution of higher education. UCA currently operates a School of Professional and Continuing Education (SPCE) in Tekeli which is a leading provider of post-secondary, short-cycle education as well as an academic publisher in the region. The Tekeli campus will offer Bachelor of Science and Bachelor of Arts degrees in Engineering Sciences and Business and Management and is anticipated to open in 2022.

== Climate ==
Tekeli has a humid continental climate (Köppen: Dfb), characterized by cold winters and warm summers. Precipitation peaks in spring. Tekeli has a wetter and milder climate than Taldykorgan 40 kilometers to the northwest.

Climate data for Tekeli (1991–2020)
Month	Jan	Feb	Mar	Apr	May	Jun	Jul	Aug	Sep	Oct	Nov	Dec	Year
Mean daily maximum °C (°F)	−1.0 (30.2)	1.7 (35.1)	7.6 (45.7)	14.8 (58.6)	19.7 (67.5)	24.0 (75.2)	26.2 (79.2)	25.8 (78.4)	21.0 (69.8)	14.3 (57.7)	5.7 (42.3)	0.9 (33.6)	13.4 (56.1)
Daily mean °C (°F)	−5.9 (21.4)	−4.0 (24.8)	1.8 (35.2)	8.7 (47.7)	13.2 (55.8)	17.5 (63.5)	19.4 (66.9)	18.7 (65.7)	14.0 (57.2)	7.7 (45.9)	0.6 (33.1)	−4.0 (24.8)	7.3 (45.1)
Mean daily minimum °C (°F)	−10.1 (13.8)	−8.4 (16.9)	−3.0 (26.6)	3.5 (38.3)	7.6 (45.7)	12.0 (53.6)	13.9 (57.0)	12.9 (55.2)	8.3 (46.9)	2.9 (37.2)	−3.4 (25.9)	−8.0 (17.6)	2.4 (36.3)
Average precipitation mm (inches)	43.1 (1.70)	43.5 (1.71)	60.2 (2.37)	91.0 (3.58)	94.8 (3.73)	83.1 (3.27)	79.8 (3.14)	45.1 (1.78)	34.2 (1.35)	61.0 (2.40)	71.4 (2.81)	54.4 (2.14)	761.6 (29.98)
Average precipitation days (≥ 1.0 mm)	7.3	7.2	8.4	9.4	9.4	8.9	8.8	5.9	4.5	6.3	8.3	8.3	92.7
Source: NOAA

== Famous natives ==
Yuri Zaypulayev was an ex-champion among juniors in the Kazakh SSR. Akyn and zhyrshy Baktybay Zholbarysuly were born in this region in 1842.

== Attractions ==
There are several attractions in the city of Tekeli, namely: 1. A street named after Dinmukhamed Kunaev with a length of about 38 km and is officially recognized as the longest street in Kazakhstan. 2. "The Tekeli Stela", "The Kelinshektas" - the oldest Buddhist monument in Kazakhstan. 3. "The Burhan Bulak" is the largest waterfall in Kazakhstan, located in the upper part of the Kora River, near Tekeli. 4. The Monument-Stele of the great Patriotic war (1941-1945), located in the center of the city at the confluence of three rivers.

In October 2021, Tekeli held AlmaFest: Tekeli Apple Festival. The purpose of the event was to honor the significance of apples for the people of Kazakhstan.
