= East/West: Journal of Ukrainian Studies =

Canadian academic journal

- Discipline: Ukrainian studies
- Language: English

Publication details
- Former name(s): Journal of Ukrainian Graduate Studies, Journal of Ukrainian Studies
- History: 1976–present
- Publisher: Canadian Institute of Ukrainian Studies (University of Alberta) (Canada)
- Frequency: Biannual

Standard abbreviations
- ISO 4: East/West: J. Ukr. Stud.

Indexing
- ISSN: 2292-7956
- Journal of Ukrainian Studies
- ISSN: 0228-1635

Links
- Journal homepage

East/West: Journal of Ukrainian Studies is a peer-reviewed academic journal covering Ukrainian studies published by the Canadian Institute of Ukrainian Studies (University of Alberta). The journal was established by George S. N. Luckyj. Originally titled Journal of Ukrainian Graduate Studies, the name was changed in 1976 to Journal of Ukrainian Studies, finally obtaining its current name in 2014.
