= University of Central Asia =

Private, not-for-profit, university

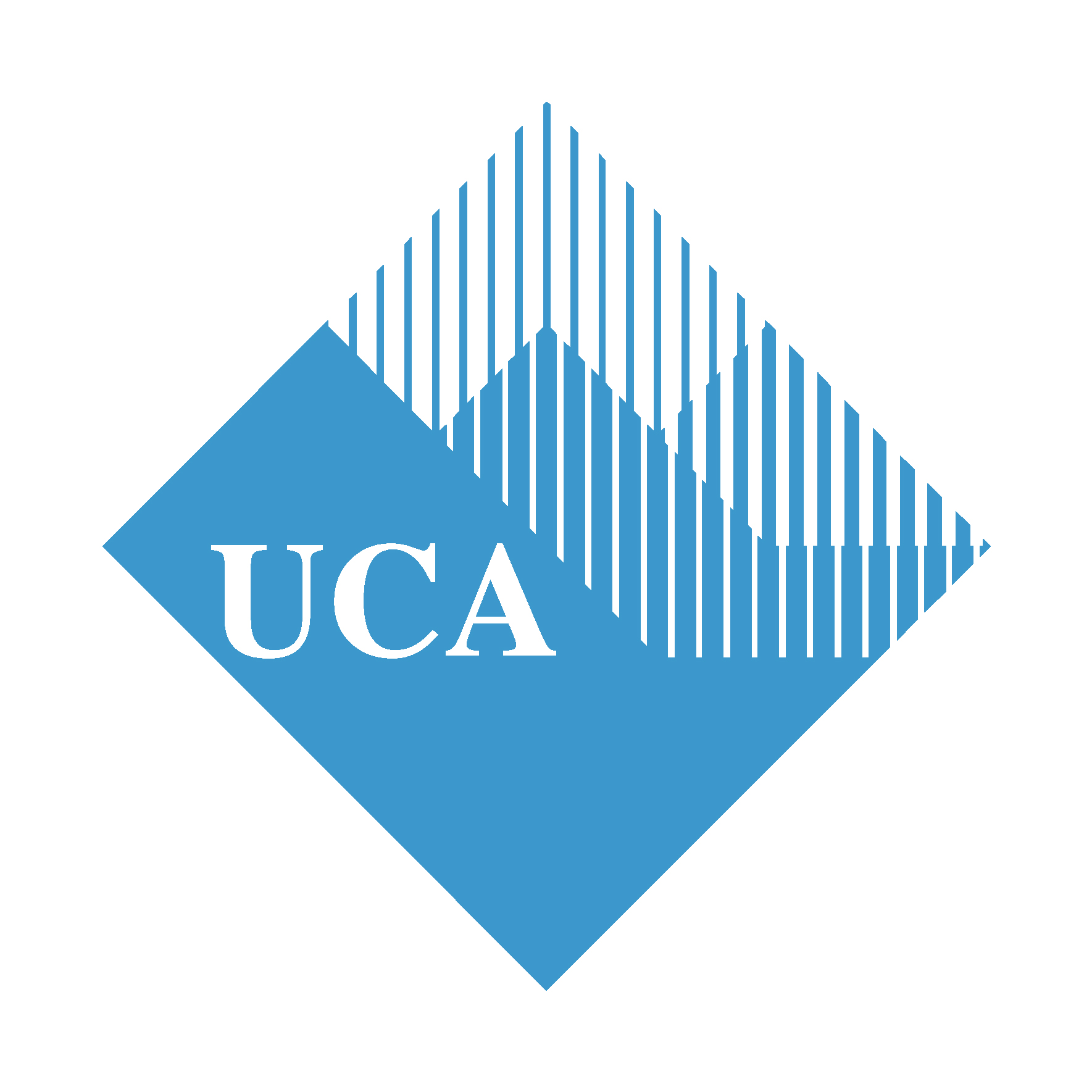
- Motto in English: Journey Begins Here
- Type: Private, non-profit, research university
- Established: 2000
- Accreditation: "№ VU200000554 (Kyrgyzstan)" (PDF).
- Affiliations: Secular
- Chairman: Shamsh Kassim-Lakha
- Chancellor: His Highness the Aga Khan
- Rector: Christopher J. Gerry
- Dean: Diana Pauna (School of Arts and Sciences); Christopher Gerry (Graduate School of Development)
- Total staff: 656 (2021)
- Undergraduates: 346 (2021)
- Location: 125/1 Toktogul Street, Bishkek, Kyrgyzstan; 42°52′29″N 74°36′44″E
- Campus: Multiple rural sites: Naryn, Khorog, Tekeli
- Language: English
- SPCE Learning Centres: Bishkek; Naryn; Tekeli; Khorog; Dushanbe; Bokhtar; Darwaz; Ishkashim; Shugnan; Fayzabad
Colours
- Website: www.ucentralasia.org
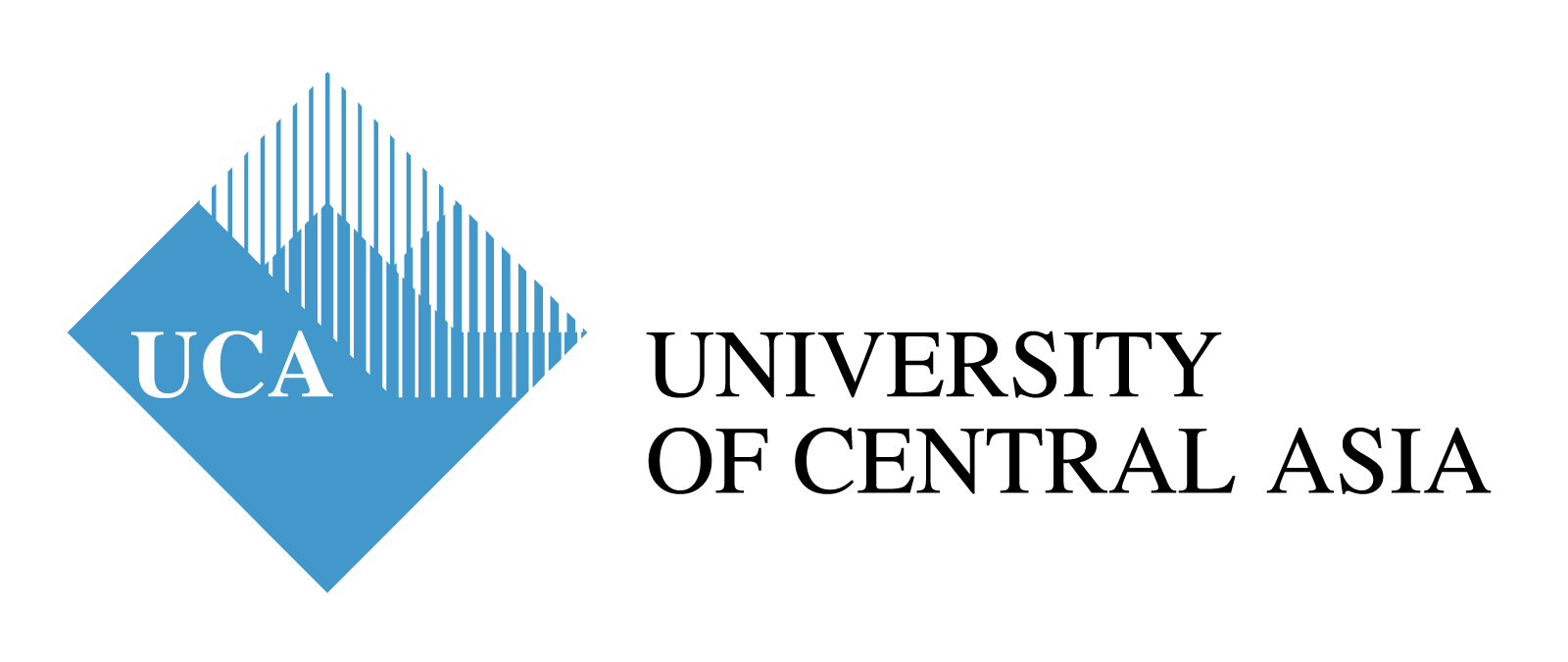

The University of Central Asia (UCA; Kyrgyz: Борбордук Азия университети, romanized: Borborduk Aziya universiteti, Russian: Университет Центральной Азии, romanized: Universitet Tsentralnoy Azii) is a private secular university in Bishkek, Chüy Region, Kyrgyzstan.

It was founded by an international charter between the governments of Tajikistan, Kyrgyzstan and Kazakhstan in partnership with the Aga Khan Development Network (AKDN) in 2000. UCA's first undergraduate campus opened in 2016 in Naryn, Kyrgyzstan, and was followed by a second campus in Khorog, Tajikistan (2017). The University has three schools: School of Arts and Sciences (SAS), Graduate School of Development (GSD) and School of Professional and Continuing Education (SPCE). The School of Arts and Sciences offers four undergraduate programmes on its two campuses. A third campus in Tekeli, Kazakhstan is currently in the planning phase.

== Undergraduate School of Arts and Sciences (SAS) ==
UCA has a five-year undergraduate programme, including a one-year preparatory programme including cross-disciplinary, liberal arts and prerequisite courses, followed by a choice of six specialisations or majors. The programme also includes a mandatory Co-operative Education programme, where students receive paid internships. Students attend the campus based on what major they choose and will graduate with a Bachelor of Arts or Bachelor of Science degree.

UCA has signed academic partnerships/memorandum of understandings with international institutions:

- Seneca College, Canada (Preparatory Programme),
- University of Technology Sydney, Australia (Communications and Media, BA),
- University of Toronto, Canada (Computer Science, BSc),
- University of British Columbia, Canada (Earth and Environmental Sciences, BSc),
- Stockholm School of Economics/Riga, Latvia (Economics, BA),
- National Research University – Higher School of Economics, Moscow, Russia (Economics, BA),
- University of Victoria, Canada (Cooperative Education Programme)
- University of Alberta, Canada: Central Asian Faculty Development Programme
- University of Cambridge, United Kingdom: Central Asian Faculty Development Programme

=== Undergraduate programmes ===
| Naryn Campus | Computer Science (BSc) | Communications and Media (BA) |
| Khorog Campus | Earth & Environmental Sciences (BSc) | Global Economics (BA) |
| Tekeli Campus | Engineering Sciences (BSc) | Business & Management (BA) |

== The Graduate School of Development (GSD) ==
The Graduate School of Development has five divisions:

1. Institute of Public Policy and Administration
2. Mountain Societies Research Institute
3. Cultural Heritage and Humanities Unit
4. Civil Society Initiative, and
5. The Aga Khan Humanities Project

== School of Professional and Continuing Education (SPCE) ==
The School of Professional and Continuing Education was launched in 2006.

On 15 February 2020, the SPCE held its first graduation ceremony for 160 students at its learning center in Bokhtar, Tajikistan. SPCE has 17 learning centers with 172,000 alumni across Afghanistan, Kazakhstan, Kyrgyzstan and Tajikistan. SPCE offers vocational and professional development programmes to various age groups.

== Campuses ==
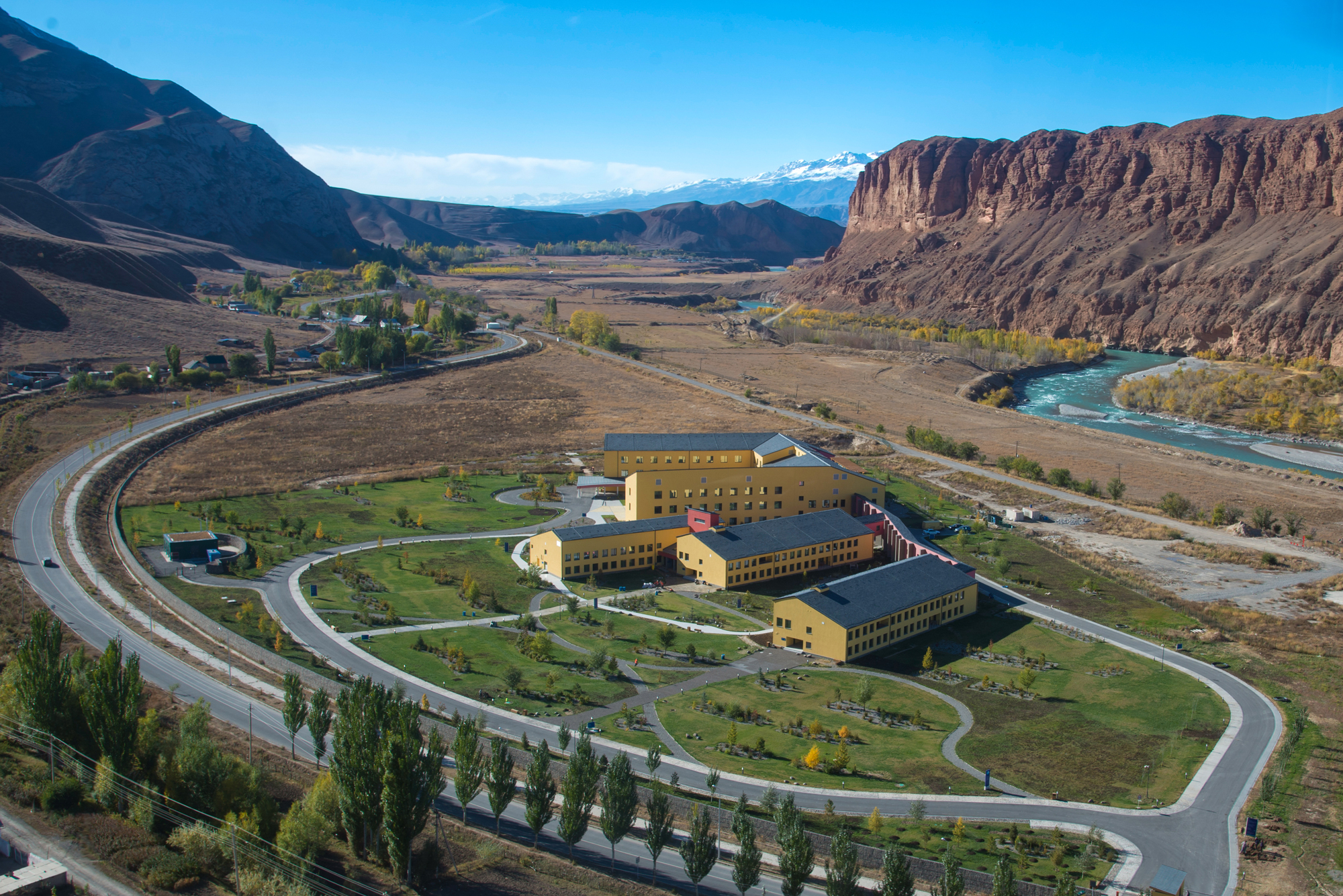
UCA Naryn Campus academic block and dormitories.

UCA's undergraduate programs are located at its residential campuses in Naryn, Kyrgyzstan and Khorog, Tajikistan. The Tekeli campus in Kazakhstan is currently in the planning phase. The campuses are of equal size and stature with modern classrooms, libraries, laboratories, secure, modular dormitories and athletic facilities open to the public, including football pitches and tennis courts.

The campus in Kyrgyzstan is situated in Naryn Town 314 km (195 miles) from Bishkek and is spread over 9 hectares for Phase 1. The campus in Naryn is the first phase of a larger vision for the 252-hectare site. Phase one includes a 13,927-square-metre space for 150 students When the final phase is complete, it will accommodate 1,200 students and span 125,000 square metres.

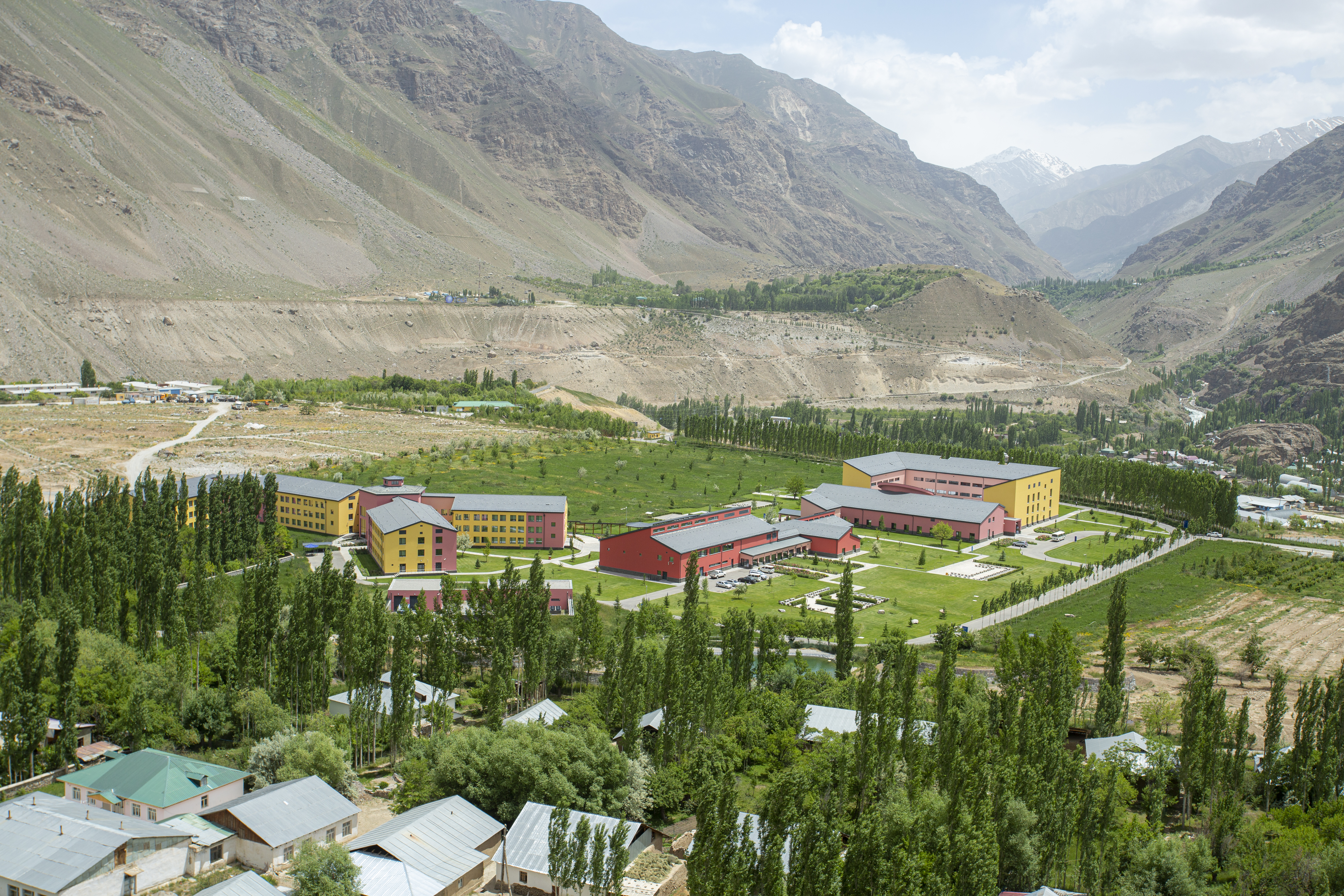
UCA Khorog Campus

The campus in Tajikistan is located in Khorog, GBAO near the border with Afghanistan in the southwestern Pamirs range at an elevation of 2,200 m (7,200 feet) and on the Gunt River where it flows into the Pyandzh.

The campus in Kazakhstan will be built in Tekeli, and is in planning stage.

All three campuses were designed by Arata Isozaki, Aoki & Associates (IAA)

== Board of trustees ==
- Shamsh Kassim-Lakha (Chairman)
- Princess Zahra Aga Khan
- Prince Rahim Aga Khan
- Professor Andrew Petter, CM, QC
- Senator Byrganym Aitimova
- Professor Hans Hurni
- Mr Naguib Kheraj
- Dr Almazbek Akmataliev
- Dr Sharofat Mamadambarova
- Dr Shenggen Fan
