= Slovo i Chas =

Ukrainian literary studies journal

- Language: Ukrainian, English

Publication details
- History: 1957–present
- Publisher: Taras Shevchenko Institute of Literature of the National Academy of Sciences of Ukraine
- Frequency: bimonthly

Standard abbreviations
- ISO 4: Slovo Chas

Indexing
- Slovo i Chas
- ISSN: 0236-1477 (print); 2707-0557 (web)

Links
- Journal homepage

Slovo i Chas (Ukrainian: Слово і Час; translated to Word and Time) is a literary studies journal founded in 1957 and published in Kyiv, Ukraine.

The journal is published by the Shevchenko Institute of Literature of the National Academy of Sciences of Ukraine and originally was co-published with the National Union of Writers of Ukraine.

Between 1957 and 1990, it was called Soviet Literary Studies (Radyanske Literaturoznavstvo), before changing its name to Word and Time. The journal started out as a bimonthly periodical; from their January 1965 issue until 2020, they published issues monthly, before again returning to a bimonthly publishing schedule.

The journal focuses on topics within literature, including Ukrainian literature, literary history and theory, and contemporary literature.

== Editors-in-chief ==
- 1957–1961 — Oleksander Biletsky
- 1961–1972 — Igor Dzeverin
- 1973–1979 — Victor Grigoryevich Belyaev
- 1980–1989 — Igor Dzeverin
- July 1989–January 2000 — Vitaliy Donchik
- February 2000–2019 — Lukash Skupeiko
- 2020–June 2024 — Igor Nabytovych.
- June 2024 — Mykola Zhulynskyi.
