= Corinne (name) =

- Gender: Female

Origin
- Origin: French/English/Greek
- Meaning: from Greek kore (maiden)

Other names
- Nickname: Cora
- Related names: Corinna, Korinna

Corinne is a female name, the French and English variant of Corina, of ancient Greek origin, derived from κόρη (korē) meaning "beautiful maiden". It became popular following the publication of Corinne, or Italy, an 1808 novel by Madame de Staël.

Various spellings of the name exist, although some attest that "Corinne" is the most appropriate and age-old spelling. Other spellings include: Corrine, Corin, Corine, Corinn, Coryn, Corryn, Koryn, Korryn, Korin, Corinna, Korinna, Corrin, and Korinne.

== Notable people with the given name ==
=== Film, stage and television ===
- Corinne Alphen (born 1954), American model and actress
- Corinne Barker (1890–1928), American actress and costume designer
- Corinne Bohrer (born 1958), American actress
- Corinne Brinkerhoff (born 1979), American television producer and writer
- Corinne Calvet (1925–2001), French actress
- Corynne Charby (born 1960), born Corinne Charbit, French actress, singer, and model
- Corinne Cléry (born 1950), French actress
- Corinne Cole (born 1937), American model and actress
- Corinne Conley (born 1929), American actress
- Corinne Foxx (born 1994), American model, actress, and television producer
- Corinne Grant (born 1973), Australian comedian and television presenter
- Corinne Griffith (1894–1979), American film actress, producer, author, and businesswoman
- Corinne Hollingworth (born 1952), British television producer and executive
- Corinne Jacker (1933–2013), American playwright and screenwriter
- Corinne Jorry (born 1943), French costume designer
- Corinne Kimball (1873–1937), American stage performer
- Corinne Lahaye (1947–2020), French actress
- Corinne Le Poulain (1948–2015), French actress
- Corinne Luchaire (1921–1950), French actress
- Corinne Marchand (born 1937), French actress
- Corinne Marrinan (born 1974), Irish-American producer and screenwriter
- Corinne Marshall (born 1980), American television writer
- Corinne Masiero (born 1964), French actress
- Corinne Maury (born 1968), French lecturer and film director
- Corinne Orr (born 1936), Canadian actress
- Corinne Skinner-Carter (born 1931), Trinidadian actress
- Corinne Touzet (born 1959), French actress and producer
- Corrinne Wicks (born 1968), British actress

=== Literature ===
- Corinne Chaponnière (born 1954), Swiss-Canadian writer and journalist
- Corinne Chevallier (born 1935), Algerian historian and novelist
- Corinne Demas, American writer and professor
- Corinne De Vailly (born 1959), French-born Canadian writer
- Corinne Hofmann (born 1960), German-Swiss writer
- Corinne Stocker Horton (1871–1947), American elocutionist, journalist, newspaper editor
- Corinne Lee, American author, writer, and poet
- Corinne McLaughlin (1947–2018), American author and educator
- Corinne Roche (born 1957), French writer
- Corinne Roosevelt Robinson (1861–1933), American writer
- Corinne Trang (born 1967), French writer

=== Music ===
- Corinne Allal (1955–2024), Israeli rock musician and music producer
- Corinne Bailey Rae (born 1979), British singer-songwriter and guitarist
- Corinne Chapelle (1976–2021), French-American violinist
- Corinne Drewery (born 1959), English singer-songwriter and fashion designer
- Corinne Gibbons, Australian singer-songwriter
- Corinne Hermès (born 1961), French singer
- Corrinne May (born 1973), Singaporean singer-songwriter
- Corinne Morgan (1876–1942/1945), American singer and pioneer recording artist
- Corinne West (born 1970), American singer-songwriter and acoustic guitarist

=== Politics ===
- Corinne Alsop Cole (1886–1971), American politician
- Corinne Bertani (born 1959), Monegasque politician
- Corinne Boyd Riley (1893–1979), American politician and teacher
- Corrine Brown (born 1946), American politician and convicted felon
- Corinne Amori Brunet, Franco-Beninese diplomat and politician
- Corinne Cahen (born 1973), Luxembourgish politician
- Corinne Ellemeet (born 1976), Dutch politician
- Corinne Erhel (1967–2017), French politician
- Corinne Féret (born 1961), French politician
- Corinne Freeman (1926–2014), American politician
- Corinne Lepage (born 1951), French politician
- Corinne Narassiguin (born 1975), French politician
- Corinne Philpott (1954–2016), Northern Irish judge
- Corinne Stubbs Brown (1849–1914), American Marxist social activist
- Corinne Vignon (born 1963), French politician
- Corinne Wood (1954–2021), American government executive

=== Sports ===
- Corinne Bodmer (born 1970), Swiss freestyle skier
- Corinne Bourquin, Swiss curler and curling coach
- Corinne Buie (born 1992), American ice hockey player
- Corinne Callahan (born 1985 as Corinne Alexander), American soccer goalkeeper and artistic photographer known as Cori Alexander
- Corinne Clark (1923–2006), American baseball player
- Corinne Diacre (born 1974), French association football player and manager
- Corinne Dibnah (born 1962), Australian professional golfer
- Corinne Favre (born 1970), French professional ski instructor, ski mountaineer, and mountain runner
- Corinne Hall (born 1987), Australian cricketer
- Corinne Hérigault (born 1970), French long jumper
- Corinne Humphreys (born 1991), English sprinter
- Corinne Imlig (born 1979), Swiss alpine skier
- Corinne Lagache (born 1975), French footballer
- Corinne Leclair (born 1970), Mauritian swimmer
- Corinne Le Moal (born 1954), French rower
- Corinne Maîtrejean (born 1979), French foil fencer
- Corinne Maier (born 1963), Swiss-born French psychoanalyst, economist, and writer
- Corinne Migneco, American international table tennis player
- Corinne Molesworth (born 1949), English tennis player
- Corinne Morris (born 1971), Canadian Olympic curler known as Cori Morris
- Corinne Niogret (born 1972), French biathlete
- Corinne Nugter (born 1992), Dutch discus thrower
- Corinne Paliard (born 1970), French ice dancer
- Corinne Peters (born 1960), Canadian curler
- Corinne Ragazzacci (born 1969), French gymnast
- Corinne Raux (born 1976), French duathlete
- Corinne Rey-Bellet (1972–2006), Swiss alpine skier
- Corinne Schmidhauser (born 1964), Swiss alpine skier
- Corinne Schneider (born 1962), Swiss and Italian athlete
- Corinne Schroeder (born 1999), Canadian ice hockey player
- Corinne Serra Tosio (born 1965), French sports shooter
- Corinne Simasotchi (born 1971), Swiss sprinter
- Corinne Suter (born 1994), Swiss alpine ski racer
- Corinne Vanier (born 1963), French tennis player
- Corinne Yorston (born 1983), English association football player
- Corinne Zanolli (born 1998), American field hockey player

=== Visual arts ===
- Corinne Cuéllar-Nathan (born 1958), Swiss painter
- Corinne Day (1962–2010), British fashion photographer
- Corrine Hunt (born 1959), Indigenous Tlingit artist, carver, jeweller and designer
- Corinne Malvern (1901–1956), American actress, commercial artist, and illustrator
- Corinne Melchers (1880–1955), American painter, humanitarian, and gardener
- Corinne Michelle West (1908–1991), American painter
- Corinne Mucha, American cartoonist, illustrator, and teaching artist
- Corinne Rey (cartoonist) better known as Coco, cartoonist with Charlie Hebdo
- Corinne Silva (born 1976), English artist
- Corinne Wasmuht (born 1964), German visual artist
- Corinne Whitaker (born 1934), American digital artist

=== Others ===
- Corinne A. Beckwith (born 1963), American judge
- Corinne Bennett (1935–2010), English conservation architect
- Corinne Bonnet, French professor and historian
- Corrine Grad Coleman (1927–2004), American writer and women's rights activist
- Corinne Debaine-Francfort (birth date unknown), French archaeologist and Sinologist
- Corinne Dettmeijer (born 1949), Dutch lawyer
- Corinne Dufka (born 1958), American photojournalist, human rights researcher, criminal investigator, and social worker
- Corinne Faut (born 1960), Belgian general
- Corinne Gallant (1922–2018), Canadian professor emeritus and feminist
- Corinne Gendron (born 1968), Canadian scholar, researcher, lawyer, and sociologist
- Corinne Grant (born 1973), Australian lawyer, comedian, and television presenter
- Corinne Heline (1882–1975) American author, Christian mystic and occultist
- Corinne Heraud (born 1963), French official
- Corinne Hofman (born 1959), Dutch archaeologist
- Corinne Le Quéré (born 1966), French-Canadian scientist
- Corinne Manogue (born 1955), American physicist
- Corinne Mentzelopoulos (born 1953), French-Greek businesswoman
- Corinne Russell (born 1963), English model and dancer
- Corinne Schädler (born 1992), Swiss beauty pageant titleholder
- Corinne Trang, French teacher, yoga instructor, chef, and author
- Corinne Vezzoni (born 1964), French architect
- Corinne Vigreux (born 1964), French business executive and entrepreneur
- Corinne Watanabe (born 1950), American judge
- Corinne Watts, New Zealand entomologist and ecologist

== Fictional characters ==
- Corinne, in the 1993 family comedy film Mr. Nanny
- Corinne, in the 2009 animated fantasy film Barbie and the Three Musketeers
- Corrine Baxter, from Strange Days at Blake Holsey High
- Corinne Maloney, Leslie Mann's character in the movie Big Daddy
- Corinne Tate, a character in the TV sitcom Soap
- "Corrine, Corrina", 1928 blues song
- Corrine, Christina Applegate's character in the 2010 film Going the Distance
- Corinne Jeffries, in the 1989 romantic comedy Chances Are
- Corinne Dollanganger, in the 1979 gothic novel "Flowers in the Attic" by V.C. Andrews
- Corinne Tan, American Girl character
- Corinne, in the 1807 novel Corinne, or Italy by Germaine de Staël
- Corinne, in the 2024 game Zenless Zone Zero by HoYoverse

== See also ==
- Corina
- Corinna (given name)
- Corinne (disambiguation)
