= Corin =

Corin is a given name in English deriving from the Latin Quirinus, a Roman god. The meaning is unclear but is probably associated with "spear".

It is used as a masculine or feminine given name, and also as a surname.

== Given name ==
- Corin Akl Jáuregui (born 1966), Venezuelan composer, pianist, and educator
- Corin Braga (born 1961), Romanian writer and academic
- Corin Hewitt (born 1971), American sculptor and photographer
- Corin Mellor (born 1966), British designer
- Corin Nemec (born 1971), American actor
- Corin Raymond, Canadian folk rock and alternative country singer-songwriter
- Corin Redgrave (1939–2010), British actor and political activist
- Corin Tucker (born 1972), American singer and guitarist

== Surname ==
- Jaclyn Corin (born 2000), American activist and advocate for gun control
- Joel P. Corin, American composer
- Lucy Corin, American writer
- William Corin (1867–1929), Australian electrical engineer

== Fictional characters ==
- Corin, a character in William Shakespeare's play As You Like It
- Corin Thunderfist, fictional character and twin of Cor in The Chronicles of Narnia
- Corin Wickes, a playable character from the video game Zenless Zone Zero

== Related names ==
- Corina, including Corine and Coreen
- Korin (disambiguation)
- Coryn (name)
- Corran (disambiguation)
- Chorin (surname)
