= Corryn =

Corryn is both a surname and a feminine given name. The given name is a variation of the name Corina or Corinne, which mean 'girl, maiden'. Notable people with the name include:

== Surname ==
- Alexander Corryn (born 1994), Belgian footballer
- Milan Corryn (born 1999), Belgian professional footballer

== Given ==
- Corryn Brown (born 1995), Canadian curler
- Corryn Rayney (1963–2007), Indian murder victim

== See also ==
- Coryn (name)
- Corrin (disambiguation)
