= Corinne Whitaker =

American artist (born 1934)

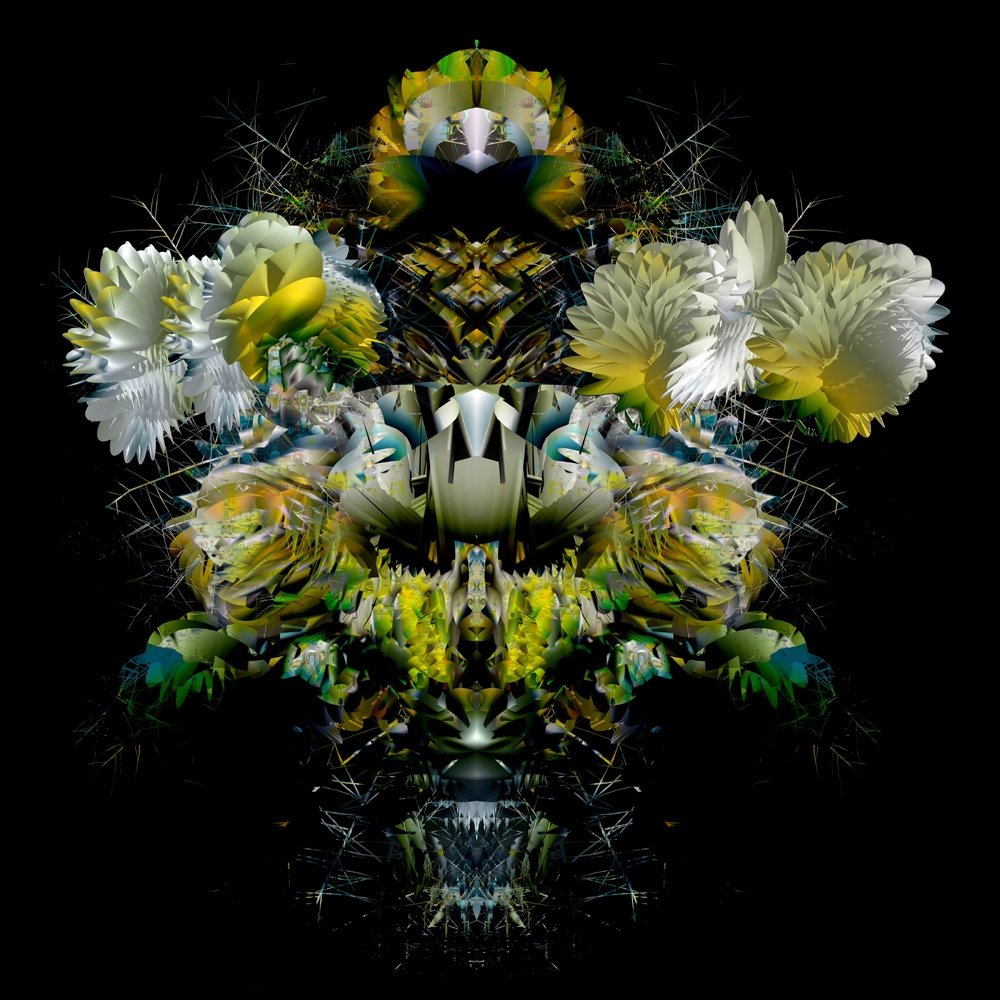
- UrnEst (imaste) by Corinne Whitaker
- Born: August 31, 1934 (age 92); Stamford, Connecticut, U.S.
- Education: Wellesley College
- Known for: Digital Imaging
- Awards: 2 Golden Web Awards (2000 and 2001); Artist’s Fellowship Award from the City of Pasadena
- Website: www.giraffe.com

Corinne Whitaker (born August 31, 1934) is an American artist who works in digital imaging and digital sculpture. She founded the Digital Giraffe in 1994, an online monthly art journal. Her works have been exhibited in about 300 group and solo shows.

== Early life ==
Whitaker was born in Stamford, Connecticut, United States. In 1956, she received her B. A. degree in Liberal Arts from Wellesley College in Wellesley, Massachusetts.

== Career ==
Before becoming a digital artist, Whitaker worked in black and white art photography. By the early 1980s she was exploring the use of early personal computers to create designs and eventually art. In 1994, Whitaker set up the Digital Giraffe, a monthly online art journal which she edits, publishes, programs, and designs. She opened a studio-gallery in Carmel, California under the same name that year as well. In 1994, Whitaker also gave the first lecture on digital art, called “Look Ma, No Paintbrush!”, at the Los Angeles County Museum of Art in California. Over the 1990s, Whitaker began to help develop the fields of digital painting and digital sculpture, as the technology evolved.

Over her career, Whitaker's work has been published more than 100 books, magazines, catalogs, and newspapers. Whitaker has also published 26 books of digital painting and poetry.

== Exhibitions ==
Whitaker's art has been exhibited in more than 200 group shows and 100 solo shows, including in the Biennale International Art Exhibition in Florence, Italy, Austin Museum of Digital Art, and the Museum of Computer Art. She has pieces of digital sculpture in DAAP, the world's first international virtual online sculpture park, and exhibited in the show Masters of Digital Art at the Ansel Adams Center in San Francisco. In 2015 her solo show of digital paintings, sculptures and 3D printed sculptures, "No Rules", was held at the Peninsula Museum of Art in Burlingame, California. Another solo show, Cybersphere took place at Stanford Art Spaces at Stanford University.

== Techniques ==
Whitaker was one of the first to print original digital images on canvas, mirrors, aluminum, Plexiglas, copper, and brass, and is among the pioneering artists working in rapid prototyping. She was invited to participate as a "distintguished artist" in the International Digital Sculpture Exhibition entitled "3D Printing and the Arts: What Things May Come" at Southwestern University in Georgetown, Texas, as well as the International Solid FreeForm Fabrication Symposium at the University of Texas at Austin.

== Paintings ==
Corinne Whitaker's Digital Paintings
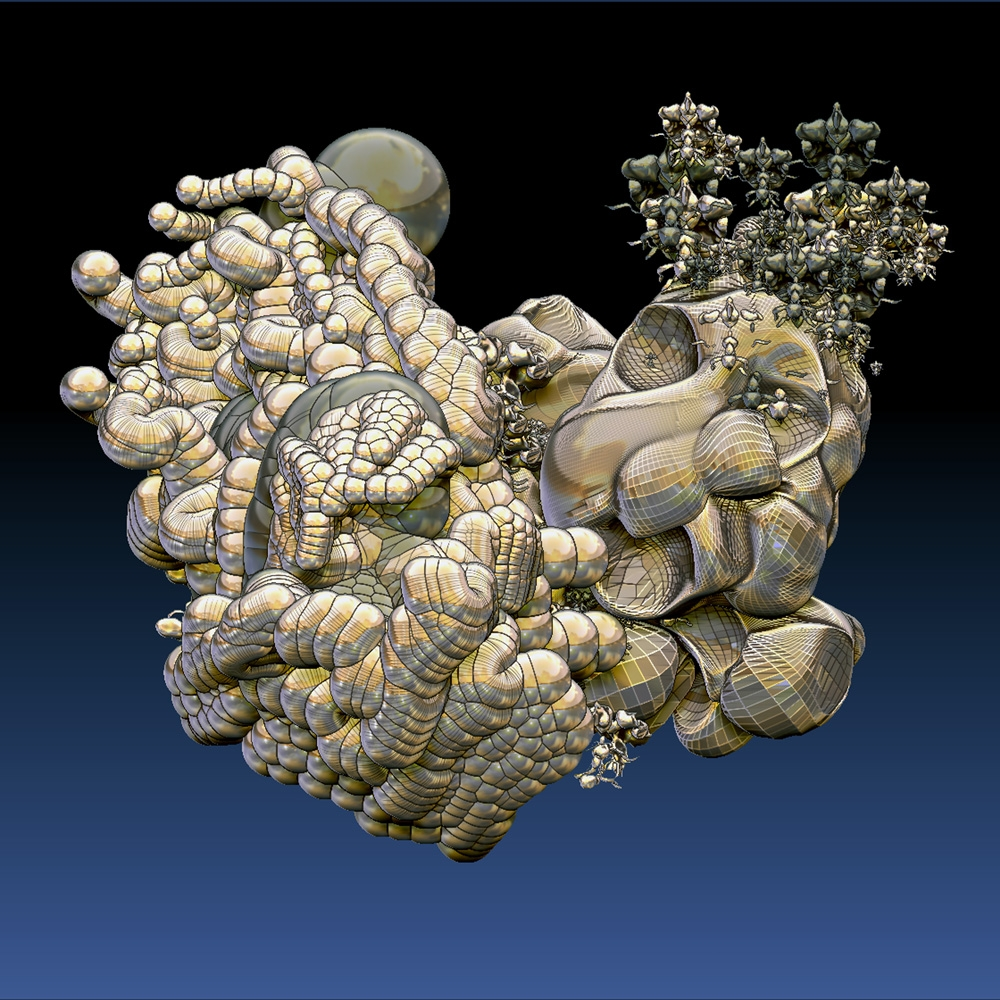
Lady of the Flies

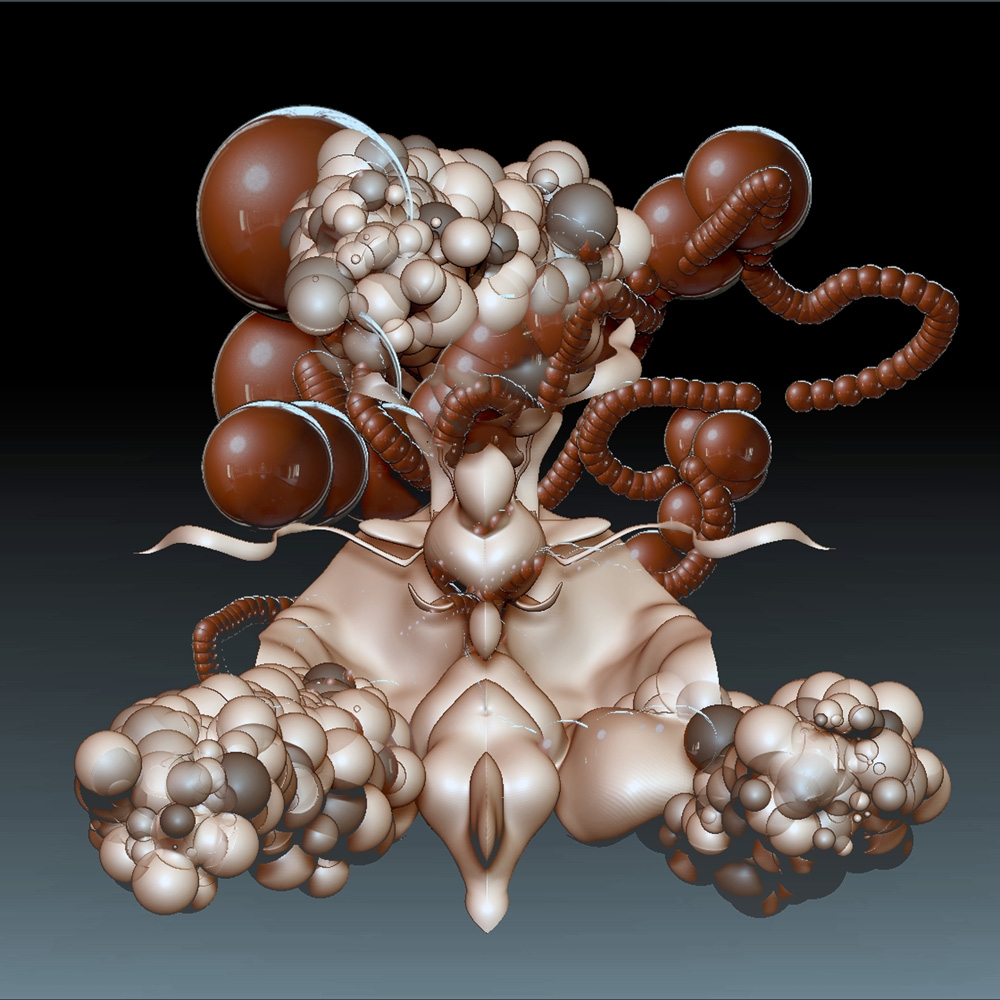
Metastasis

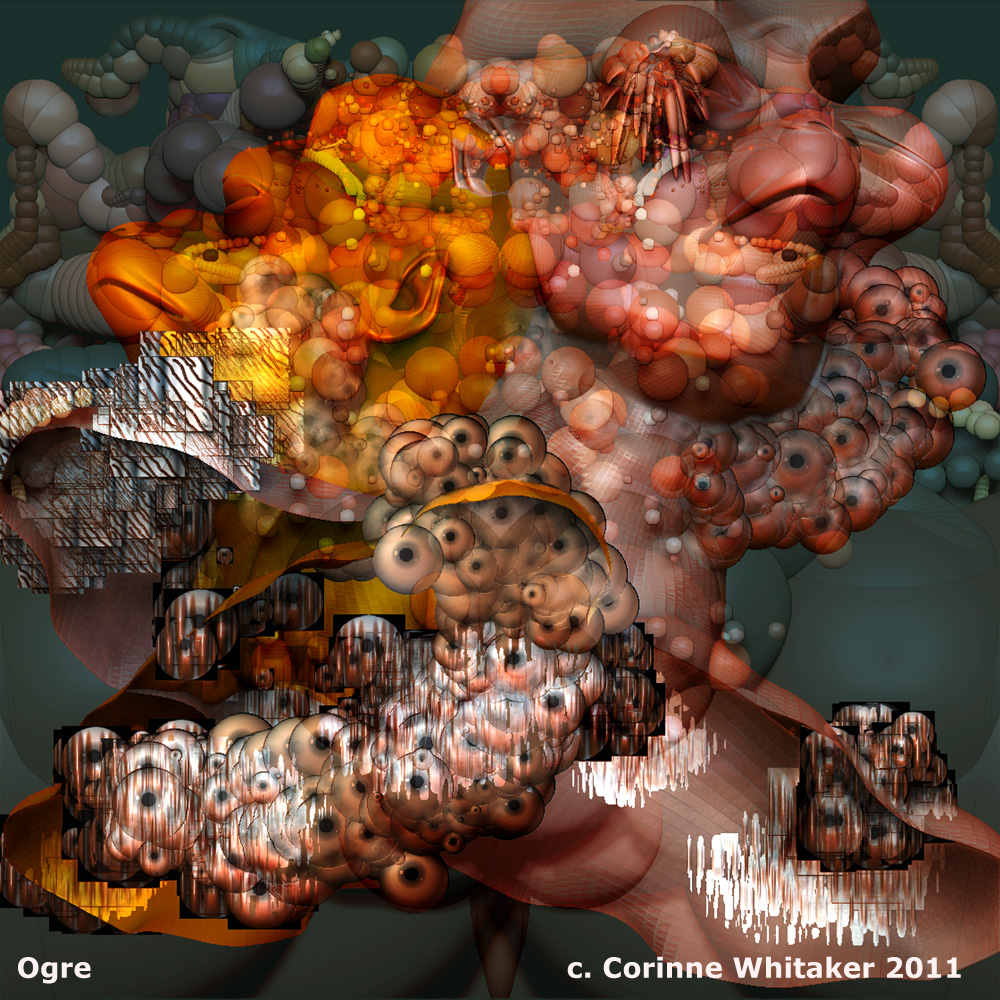
Ogre

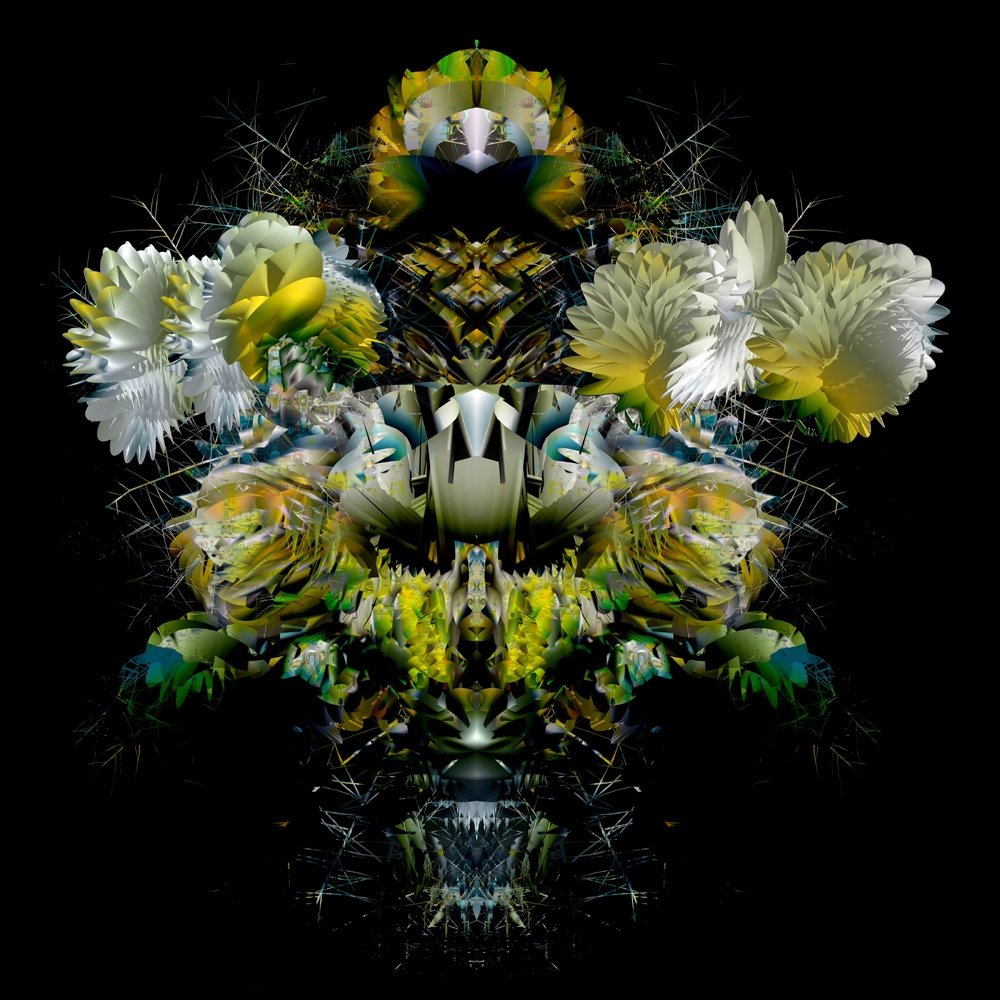
UrnEst (imaste)

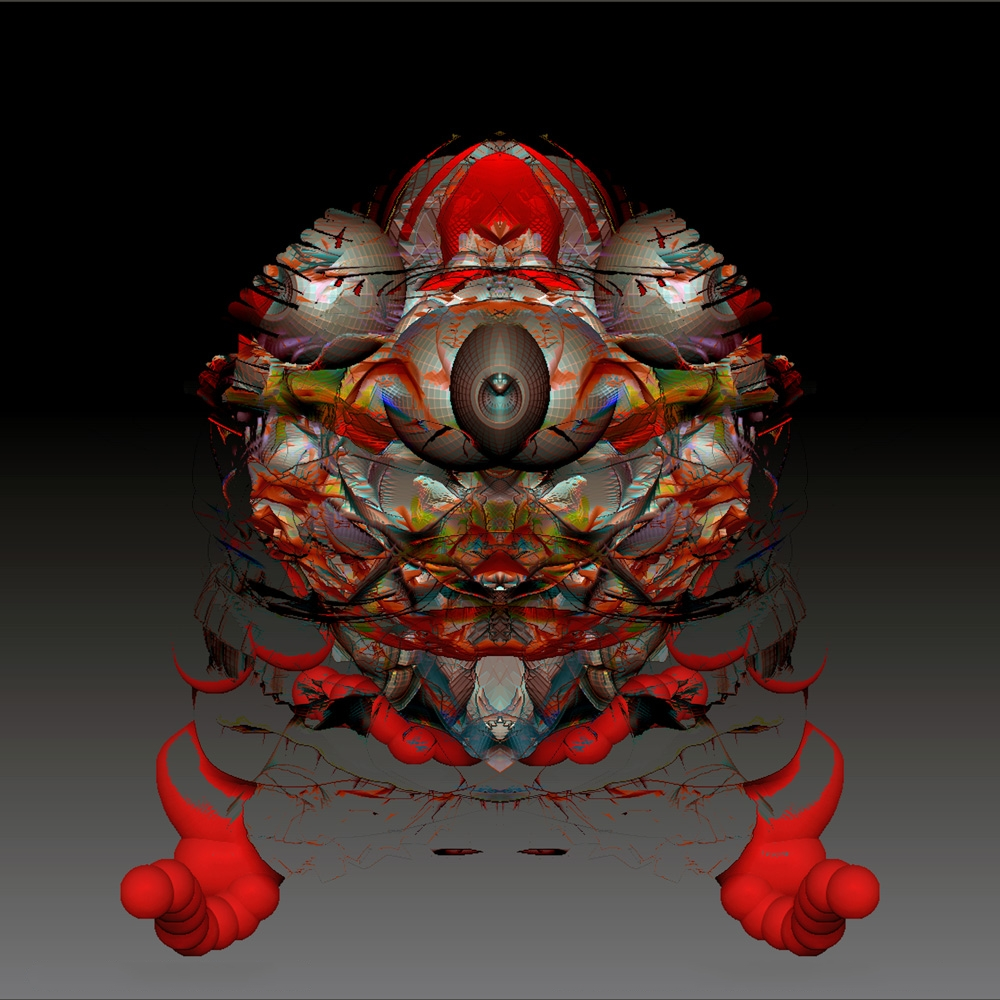
Caught Flatfooted
