= Killaclohane Portal Tomb =

Irish Stone Age burial monument

- Chill an Chlocháin (Irish)
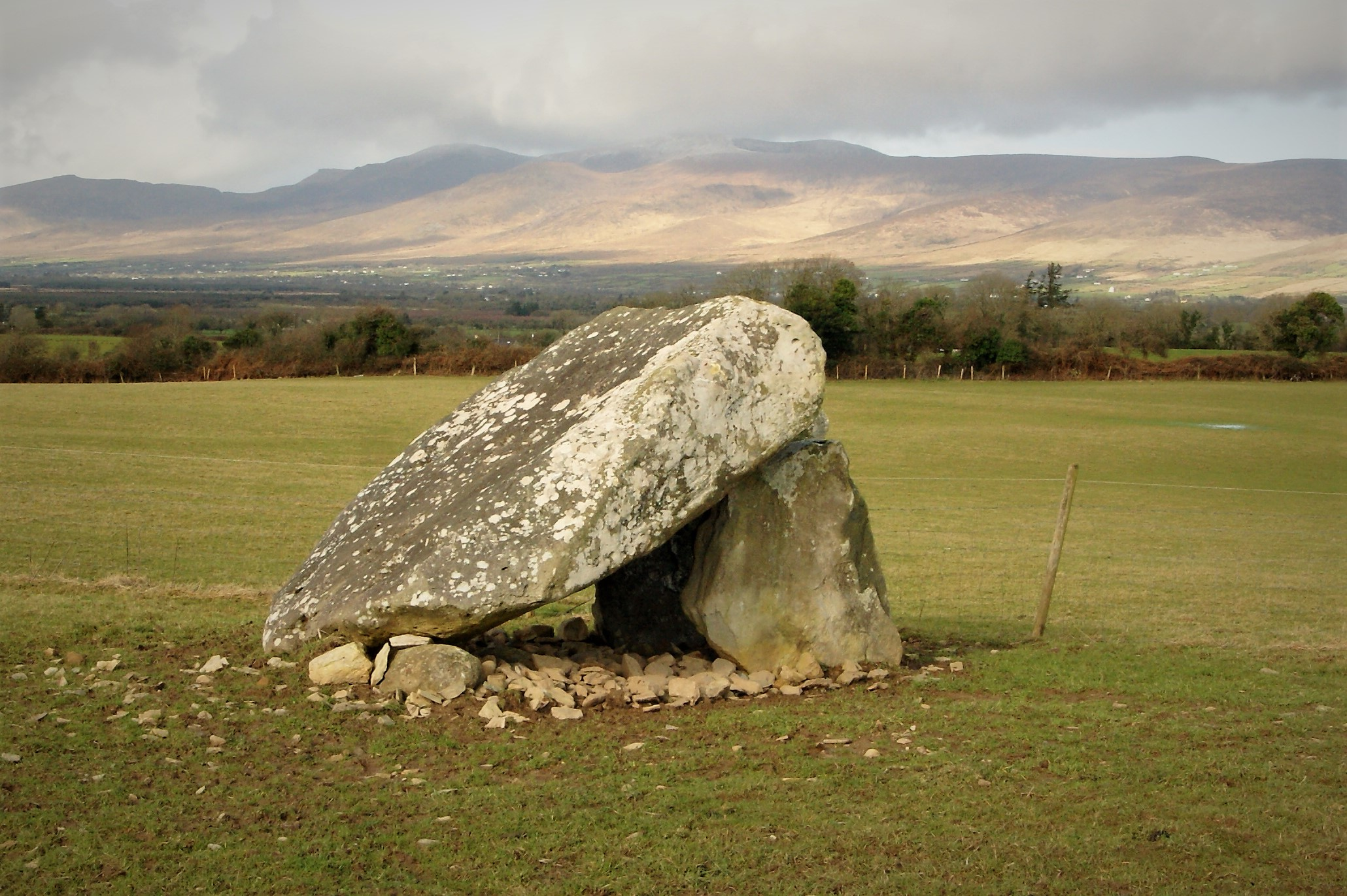
- The tomb in 2016

- Location in Ireland
- 52.149230°N 9.693490°W
- Type: Portal tomb
- Periods: Megalithic
- Location: County Kerry, Ireland

History
- Built: c. 3800 BC

Site notes
- Material: Sandstone

Killaclohane Portal Tomb is a megalithic tomb located in the townland of Killaclohane, about 2 km east of Milltown, County Kerry, Ireland. This Neolithic tomb dates to 3800 BC and is Kerry’s oldest man-made structure and earliest identified burial monument. In 2015, the portal tomb or dolmen was in imminent danger of collapse and was excavated and restored by a team led by Kerry County Archaeologist, Dr Michael Connolly. Prior to the excavation of Killaclohane Portal Tomb, very little was known about Neolithic settlement in Kerry and the beginning of agriculture.

== Name ==
Killaclohane is an English phonetic transcription of Cill an Chlocháin, from coill meaning wood and clochán meaning stepping-stones, causeway or old stone structure. Alternatively, it has also been translated to mean ‘Church of the strong ford’.

== Design ==
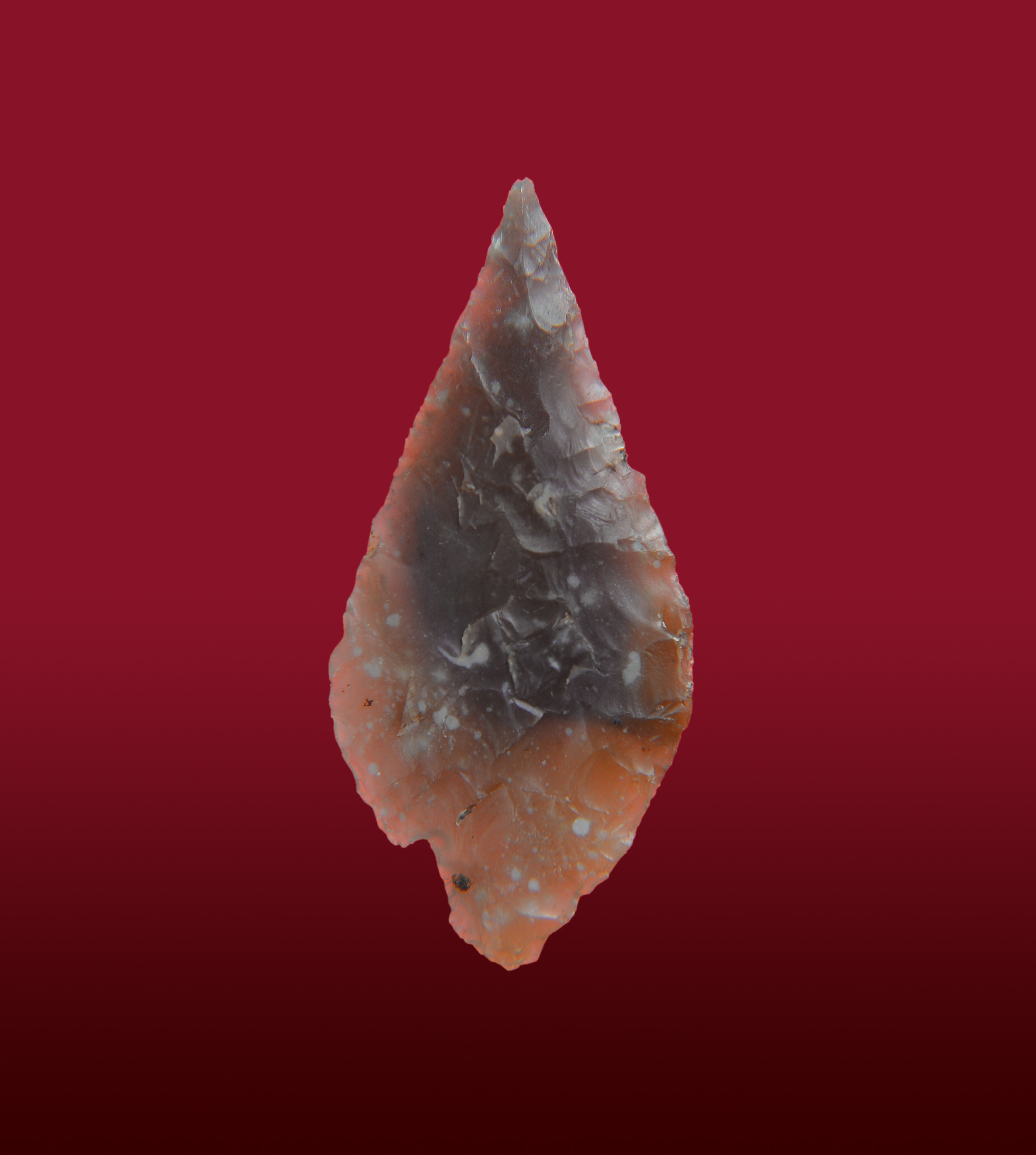
Large arrow head, c. 3500 BC

The portal tomb is constructed with a very large capstone weighing 13.5 tonnes and two tall portal stones at the front facing North. All three stones are green sandstone and are glacial erratics. The two capstones support the weight of the capstone and form the entrance into the burial chamber. The burial chamber is orientated to the North and faces the entrance to Scotia's Glen at the Sliabh Mish Mountains. The excavation of the burial chamber in 2015 produced evidence of cremation burial in the tomb as well as a range of artefacts dating to the early and middle Neolithic period.

== Artefacts and burial phases ==
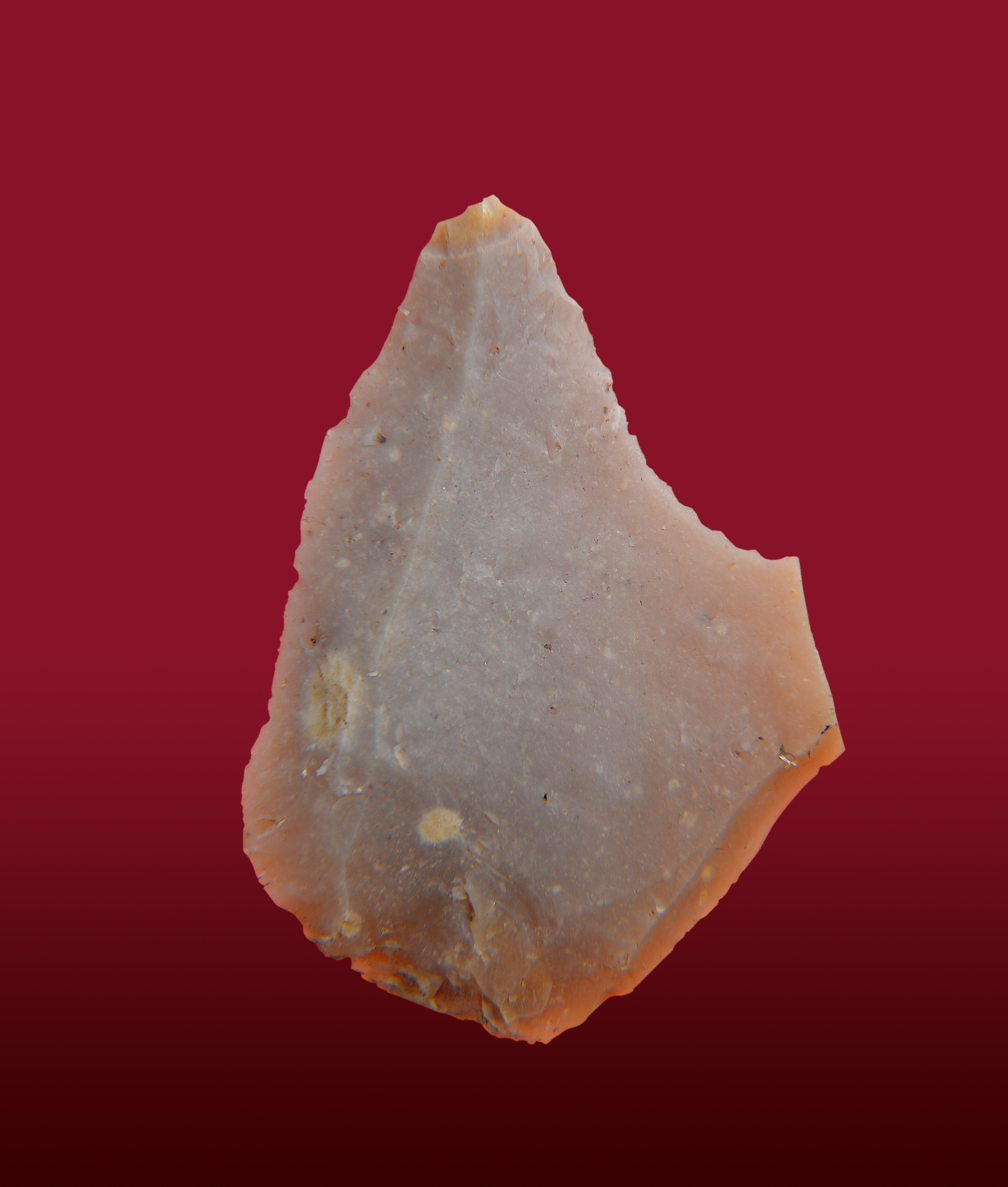
A large flint scraper, possibly used for the making of arrow shafts

The earliest material found in the tomb was early Neolithic carinated bowl pottery, which is the earliest pottery type found in Ireland. It dates to around 3700 BC and signifies the first phase of burial around the time the tomb was constructed. A range of flint artefacts, including a knife, three arrowheads and a hollow scraper are associated with a second phase of burial around 3500 BC. Pottery sherds dating to around 3400 BC indicate a third phase of burial. Furthermore, the tomb was used again in the Bronze Age with at least two cremation burials being put into the tomb around 2400 BC. Radiocarbon dates from bone samples and from charcoal indicate a long history of use for burial and subsequently as a focal point or important site in the landscape.

== Importance ==
The excavation and conservation of Killaclohane prompted a reassessment of two other megalithic structures in the vicinity. The new assessment suggested that both structures are also portal tombs. The second tomb is located in the same townland in Killaclohane Wood, a public recreational area and it was excavated in 2017 and 2018. A third tomb in the adjacent townland of Brackhill has not been excavated yet. These three tombs comprise a small cluster of portal tombs, a monument type which is predominantly found in the northern half of Ireland and it is the only cluster of portal tombs found in Munster.
