= Anna Korvinus =

Anna Gerardina (Dien) Korvinus (Java, 1939) was appointed in 2000 as the first (Dutch) National Rapporteur on Human trafficking.

In 1997, Treaty of Amsterdam/Declarations Adopted by the Conference, such as"Declaration on the Overseas Countries and Territories"and"Declaration relating to Western European Union"and also the Hague Ministerial Declaration on European Guidelines for Effective Measures, adopted to Prevent and Combat Trafficking in Women for the Purpose of Sexual Exploitation (or the Hague Declaration) established by the European Union that European member states were expected to conduct structural and independent research. For Human trafficking. The statement stated, among other things, that each Member State should have an independent rapporteur on Human trafficking. In the Netherlands, Anna Korvinus, LL.M., was appointed rapporteur in this area at the Ministry of Justice in 2000. Before working as a Dutch National Rapporteur on Trafficking in Human Beings and Sexual Violence against Children, Korvinus first worked for three decades at the Public Prosecution Service: first from 1969 as a public prosecutor at the Rotterdam court and from 1980 as an attorney general at the Amsterdam Court of Justice.

Korvinus was succeeded as National Rapporteur on Trafficking in Human Beings in 2006 by Corinne Dettmeijer.
