= Gendron =

Gendron is a French surname. Notable people with the surname include:

- Annick Gendron (1939–2008), a French abstract painter
- Corinne Gendron (born 1968), Canadian academic and sociologist
- Dennis Gendron (1957–2021), an American ice hockey coach
- Ferdinand-Ambroise Gendron (1856–1917), Canadian lumber merchant and politician
- François Gendron (born 1944), a Canadian politician
- François-Eric Gendron (born 1954), French actor
- Jean-Denis Gendron (1925–2025), Canadian linguist and academic
- Jean-Guy Gendron (1934–2022), Canadian ice hockey player
- Lucien Henri Gendron (1899–1959), Canadian politician
- Marie-Belle Gendron, Canadian politician
- Martin Gendron (born 1974), Canadian ice hockey player
- Maurice Gendron (1920–1990), French cellist and teacher
- Monique Gendron, Canadian organist
- Myriam Gendron, Canadian musician and songwriter
- Odore Joseph Gendron (1921–2020), American Roman Catholic Church bishop
- Payton Gendron (born 2003), American neo-Nazi mass murderer committed a mass shooting at a Tops Friendly Markets in Buffalo, New York
- Pierre Gendron (1916–1984), Canadian academic
- Pierre Gendron (born 1952), Canadian film producer from Quebec
- Pierre-Samuel Gendron (1828–1889), Canadian politician
- Romuald Montézuma Gendron (1865–1946), Canadian politician
- Rosaire Gendron (1920–1986), Canadian politician
- Sophie Gendron, Canadian actress
- Stéphane Gendron (born 1967), Canadian politician and political analyst

== See also ==
- Gendron Commission, 1968 Commission of Inquiry on the Situation of the French Language and Linguistic Rights in Quebec, Canada
