= Coryn (name) =

Coryn is both a surname and a primarily feminine given name. The given name is a variation of the name Corina or Corinne, which mean 'girl, maiden'. Notable people with the surname or given name include:

== Surname ==
- Jana Coryn (born 1992), Belgian football striker
- Laetitia Coryn (born 1984), French comic artist, illustrator, and voice actor

== Given ==
- Quirijn Boel (1620–1668), also referred to as Coryn Boel, Flemish engraver
- Coryn Labecki (born 1992), American racing cyclist

== Fictional ==
- Coryn, also known as Nyroc, a barn owl in the book series Guardians of Ga'Hoole

== See also ==
- Corryn
- Corin
