= Vezzoni =

Vezzoni is a surname. Notable people with the surname include:

- Corinne Vezzoni (born 1964), French architect
- Franco Vezzoni (born 2001), Argentine professional footballer
