= Bláthnat =

Irish mythological princess

- Ulster Cycle character

In-universe information
- Alias: Bláthíne
- Title: Princess
- Family: Mend or Midir (father)
- Spouse: Cú Roí
- Significant other: Cú Chulainn
- Nationality: Irish

Bláthnat ("Little flower"), sometimes Bláthíne, is a character in early Irish literature, a king's daughter, wife of the warrior Cú Roí and the lover of his rival Cú Chulainn.

== Love triangle ==
Her father is either Mend of Inis Fer Falga (identified as the Isle of Man), Iuchna, Conchobar mac Nessa, or Midir, the fairy king of Brí Léith (from Westmeath).

Her father's kingdom was invaded by warriors of the Red Branch of Ulster, led by Cú Roí and Cú Chulainn. The raid led to her capture, along with several cattle and a magic cauldron. Despite being in love with Cú Chulainn, she was chosen by Cú Roí as his spoil and married him, leading to a dispute between the two warriors. This ended with Cú Chulainn being shaved and humiliated by Cú Roí.

Later, she betrayed her husband to his enemies, pouring milk into the River Finglas (Finnglas), supposedly at the Caherconree Fort, as a signal he was at home. Subsequent to this action, Cú Roí was slain by Cú Chulainn. In revenge for this, Cú Roí's poet Ferchertne, threw both himself and Blathnát from a cliff.

Bláthnat's floral name and the story of her conspiracy have been compared to those of Blodeuwedd in the Fourth Branch of the Mabinogi, Math fab Mathonwy.

== Fled Bricrenn ==
Blathnat makes an appearance in the Fled Bricrenn (Feast of Bricriu) as the wife of the absent Cú Roí. She tells each of the three heroes to guard the fort on different nights, however only Cú Chulainn is able to defeat the force. Because of this, Cú Roí gives Cú Chulainn the Champion's Portion that he had been quarreling with the other heroes for, however the other two demand a rematch.
