= Chorin (surname) =

Chorin is a surname. Notable people with the surname include:

- Aaron Chorin (1766–1844), Hungarian rabbi and religious reformer
- Alexandre Chorin (born 1938), American mathematician
- Ethan Chorin (born 1968), American Middle East and Africa-focused scholar and entrepreneur
- Ferenc Chorin (1842–1925), Hungarian politician
