= Corrin (disambiguation) =

Corrin is a heterocyclic macromolecule, it forms the "core" of vitamin B_{12} and is also related to the porphyrin ring in hemoglobin.

Corrin may also refer to:

- Corrin (surname)
- Corrin (Dune), a place in the Dune universe
- Corrin (Fire Emblem), the main character of the video game Fire Emblem Fates
- Corrin (Kerry), a 332m peak in the Slieve Mish Mountains
- Corrin Brooks-Meade (1988–2025), English-born Montserratian footballer
