= Caherconree =

Mountain in County Kerry, Ireland

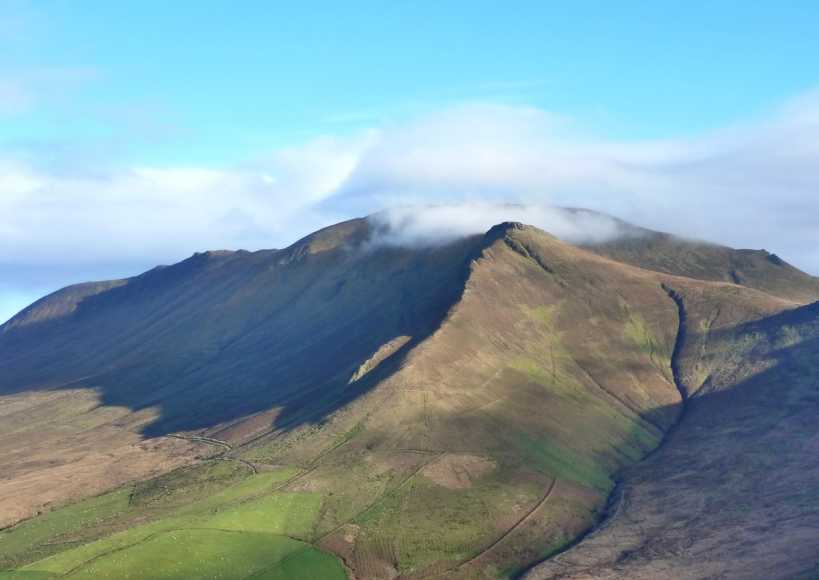
- Summit of Caherconree (in cloud), and pyramidal summit of the promontory fort (near), from south

Highest point
- Elevation: 835 m (2,740 ft)
- Prominence: 129 m (423 ft)
- Listing: 100 Highest Irish Mountains, Hewitt, Arderin, Simm, Vandeleur-Lynam
- Coordinates: 52°12′10.904″N 9°51′13.409″W

Naming
- Native name: Cathair Conraoi
- English translation: stone fort of Cú Roí

Geography
- Location within island of Ireland
- Location: Dingle Peninsula, County Kerry, Ireland
- Parent range: Slieve Mish Mountains
- OSI/OSNI grid: Q7331707260
- Topo map: OSi Discovery 71

Geology
- Mountain type: Aeolian sandstone

Climbing
- Easiest route: Caherconree Fort Trail

National monument of Ireland
- Official name: Caherconree Promontory Fort
- Reference no.: 184

Caherconree (Irish: Cathair Conraoi, meaning ''Cú Roí’s stone fort') at 835 metres (2,740 ft), is the 20th–highest peak in Ireland on the Arderin scale, and the 27th–highest peak on the Vandeleur-Lynam scale. Caherconree is the 2nd-highest mountain in the Slieve Mish Mountains in the Dingle Peninsula in County Kerry, Ireland, and one of its southerly spurs is the site of an ancient stone promontory fort, which is a protected National Monument.

== Naming ==
In Irish academic Paul Tempan's Irish Hills and Mountain Names, the name derives from Cú Roí mac Daire, the legendary king of Munster who features in many Irish folklore tales including those concerning Cú Chulainn and Bláthnat.

== Geography ==
Caherconree is the 2nd-highest mountain of the Slieve Mish range, which is situated at the eastern-end of the Dingle Peninsula, in County Kerry. Caherconree is part of a "horseshoe" of the largest peaks in the Slieve Mish range that bound the deep glaciated valley of the Derrymore Glen, that include the mountains of Gerahane 792 metres (2,598 ft) (Irish: An Géarán, meaning 'the fang'), and Baurtregaum 851 metres (2,792 ft), the highest peak in the range.

Caherconree's prominence of 129 metres (423 ft) does not qualify it as a Marilyn, however, it ranks it as the 11th-highest mountain in Ireland on the MountainViews Online Database, 100 Highest Irish Mountains, where the minimum prominence threshold is 100 metres.

== Hill walking ==
The easiest route is the 4-kilometre 2-hour return trip from the Bóthar na gCloch road (a north-south road between the N86 and the R561 roads); from where an easterly Caherconree Fort Trail goes from the car-park to the ancient promontory fort, from which the summit of Caherconree can be easily accessed.

A popular method of climbing Caherconree is via is the Derrymore Glen Horseshoe, a 11-kilometre 5-hour loop that starts from the base of the Derrymore Glen and ascends to the first summit of Gearhane, and then around the "horseshoe" to Caherconree and the summit of Baurtregaum. Options for the descent use either the Baurtregaum NW Top spur or the Baurtregaum NE Top Spur (and the Scragg) to get back to the base of the Glen. The route is recommended for its views of the Glen as well as incorporating most of the main peaks of the Slieve Mish range, and is also called The Slieve Mish Circuit in some guidebooks.

== Caherconree Promontory Fort ==
Caherconree is named after an Iron Age stone promontory fort, Caherconree Promontory Fort at 683 metres (2,241 ft), that sits two-thirds of the way up its southwestern shoulder, overlooking the north-south running mountain road called Bóthar na gCloch ("road of the stones"). The fort is surrounded on three sides by steep cliffs. In Irish mythology this is the fort of Cú Roí mac Dáire, who was able to make it spin around at night to stop attackers finding the entrance.

In the story of Aided Con Roí, a king's daughter called Bláthnat is taken against her will to the fort by Cú Roí. She is rescued by her lover, Cú Chulainn, to whom she signals that the time will be right to attack when she pours milk into a nearby stream; Bláthnat created the opportunity by taunting Cú Roí that his fort was too small for such a magnificent chieftain thus compelling him to take down the walls to build a bigger fort. This stream is now called the Finglas (from an Fhionnghlaise meaning "the white stream") and its source is close to the remains of the ringfort.

Between the summits of Caherconree and Gearhane, is a rock feature called Fin MacCool's Chair, named after the mythical figure Fionn mac Cumhaill.

== Gallery ==
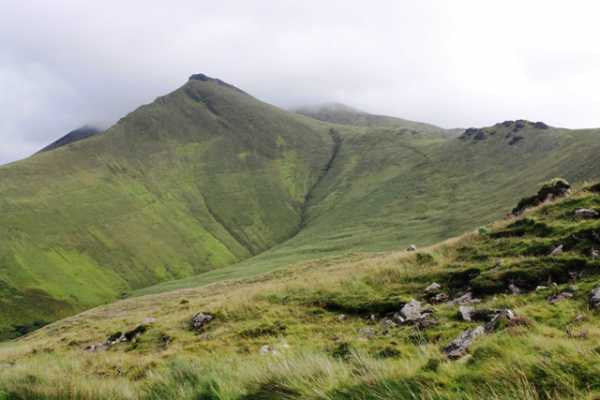
Peak of the hill fort

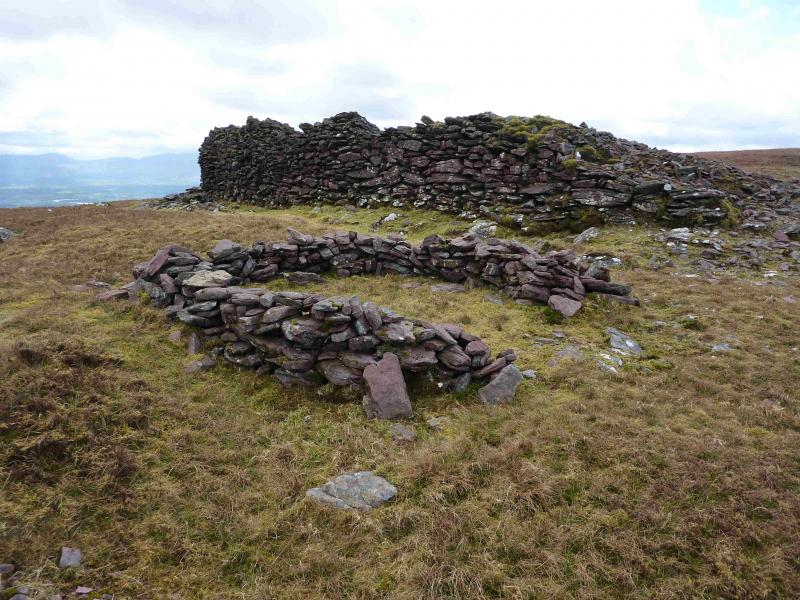
Hill fort ruins

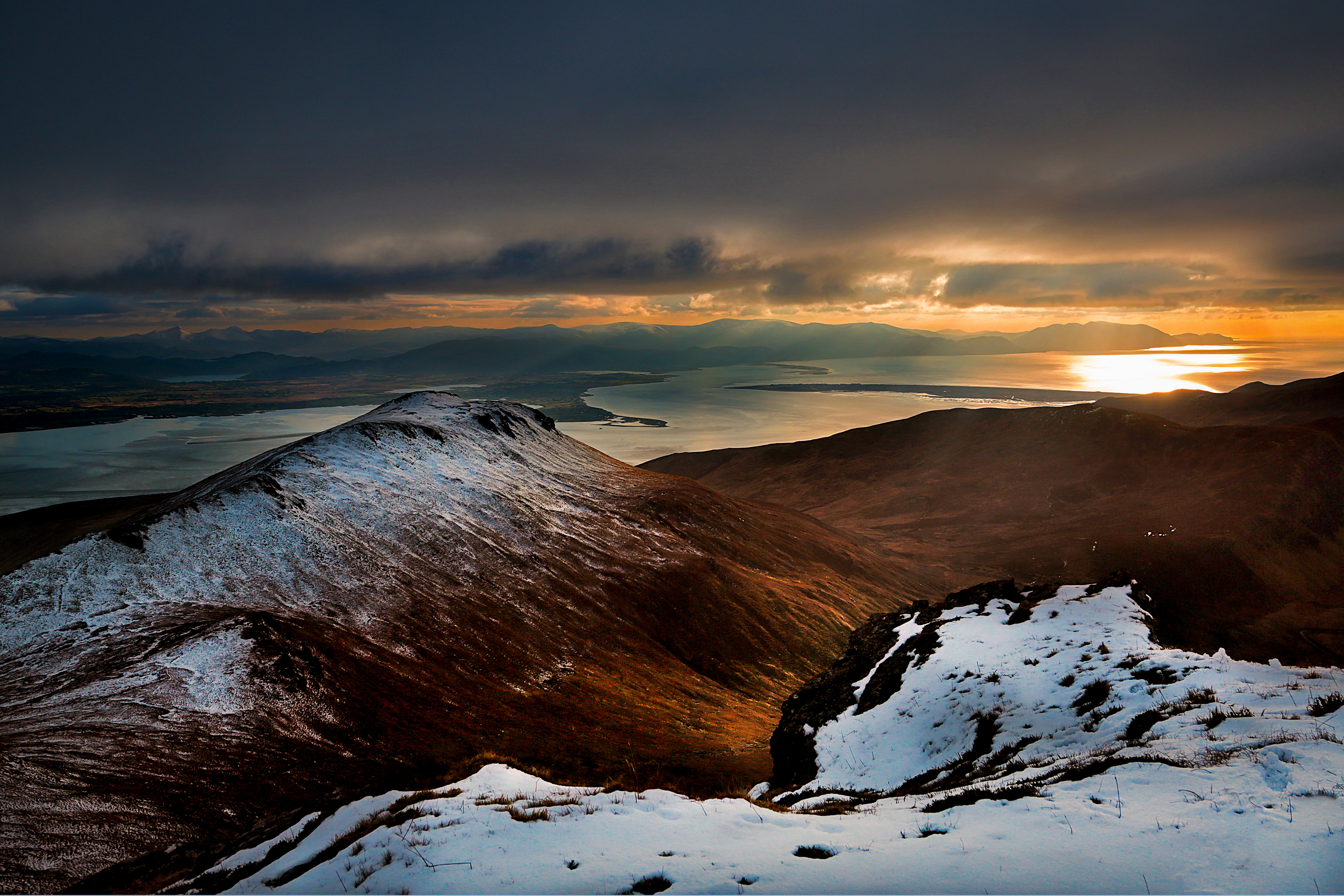
View south from summit

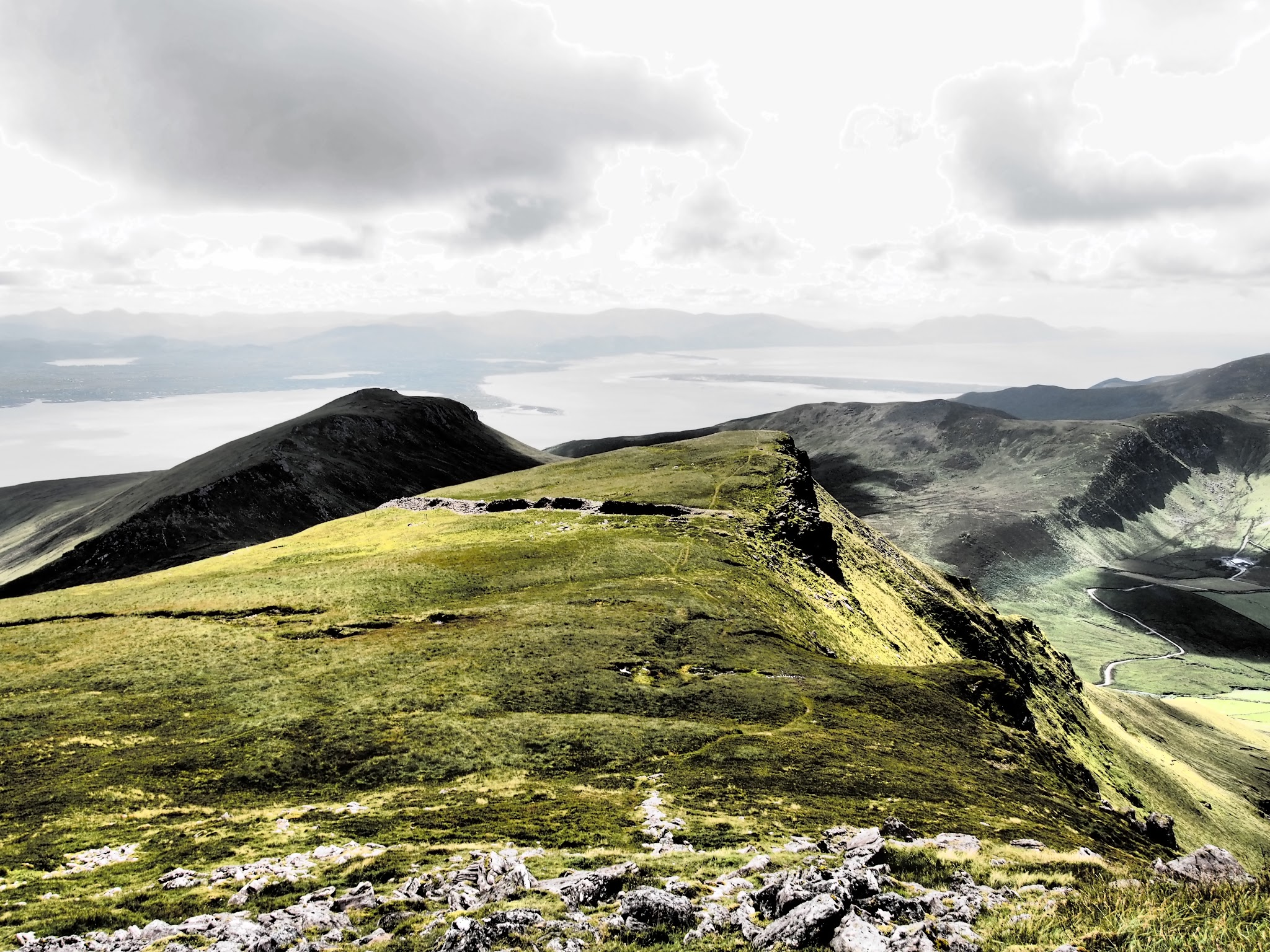
Hill fort from summit

== See also ==
- List of mountains in Ireland
- Lists of mountains and hills in the British Isles
- List of Hewitt mountains in England, Wales and Ireland
