= Herman Bolhaar =

Dutch journalist

H.J. (Herman) Bolhaar (born in Epe in 1955) has been a National Rapporteur on trafficking in persons, especially in women and children, in Netherlands since 1 February 2018. Bolhaar succeeded Corinne Dettmeijer, who was retired as a National Rapporteur on Human trafficking in 15 November 2017.

== Career ==
Bolhaar was Chief Public Prosecutor in Amsterdam, He became Director of Public Prosecutions from 2008 to 2011, He was subsequently a senior fellow of the Ash Center for Democratic Governance and Innovation from 1 June 2011 to 1 June 2017 which is part of the Kennedy School of Government at Harvard University in Cambridge, Massachusetts, in the United States.

As a Director of Public Prosecutions, Bolhaar was involved in tackling human trafficking. For example, he chaired the Human Trafficking Task Force in which the police, the Public Prosecution Service, municipalities, the Royal Marechaussee, the Social Affairs and Employment Inspectorate, the Immigration and Naturalization Service collaborate with the Chamber of Commerce, Non-governmental organization and private parties such as the hotel and catering industry.

In June 2018, a Report produced by Bolhaar, as National Rapporteur of Human trafficking and Sexual Violence against Children in Netherland about the Victim Monitor on sexual violence against children. Current evidence strongly suggests that those who are trafficked into the sex industry and as domestic servants are more likely to be women and children. in Europe on trafficked women found that the women were subjected to serious forms of abuse, such as physical or sexual violence, that affected their physical and mental health. This report showed, among other things, that 85% of girls who stay in closed youth care receive help for sexual violence.
