= Baurtregaum =

Mountain in County Kerry, Ireland

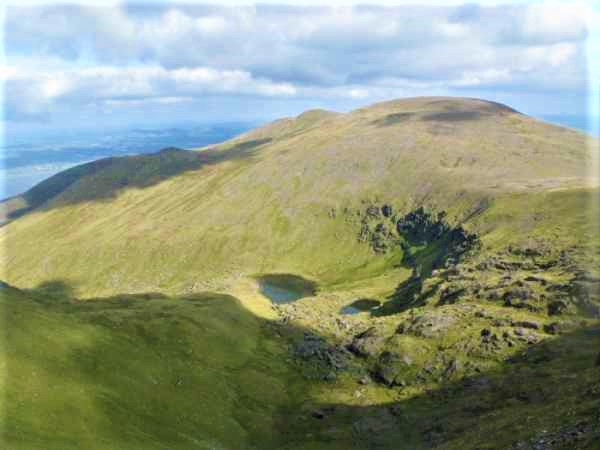
- Baurtregaum and the lakes in Derrymore Glen

Highest point
- Elevation: 851 m (2,792 ft)
- Prominence: 643 m (2,110 ft)
- Listing: P600, 100 Highest Irish Mountains, Marilyn, Hewitt, Arderin, Simm, Vandeleur-Lynam
- Coordinates: 52°12′25.371″N 9°49′46.112″W

Naming
- Native name: Barr Trí gCom
- English translation: top of the three hollows

Geography
- Location within island of Ireland
- Location: Dingle Peninsula, County Kerry, Ireland
- Parent range: Slieve Mish Mountains
- OSI/OSNI grid: Q7498607665
- Topo map: OSi Discovery 71

Geology
- Mountain type: Quartz-pebble conglomerate

Climbing
- Easiest route: Via the Derrymore Glen

Baurtregaum (Irish: Barr Trí gCom, meaning 'top of the three hollows') at 851 metres (2,792 ft), is the 13th–highest peak in Ireland on the Arderin scale, and the 18th–highest peak on the Vandeleur-Lynam scale. Baurtregaum is situated at the centre of the massif of the Slieve Mish Mountains on the Dingle Peninsula in County Kerry, Ireland. It is the tallest mountain of the Slieve Mish range, with a number of major subsidiary summits.

== Naming ==
According to Irish academic Paul Tempan, the "three hollows" in the Irish name are probably the valleys of Derrymore (north), Derryquay (north-east) and Curraheen (east), which cut into the sides of the mountain.

== Geography ==
Baurtregaum is the highest mountain of the Slieve Mish range, which is situated on the eastern end of the Dingle Peninsula, in County Kerry. It is connected by a western ridge to the 2nd-highest peak in the range, Caherconree 835 metres (2,740 ft). Baurtregaum has several subsidiary peaks including, Baurtregaum NW Top 723 metres (2,372 ft), Baurtregaum NE Top 819 metres (2,687 ft) (with northern spur Scragg), and Baurtregaum Far NE Top 603 metres (1,978 ft).

The most notable of Baurtgreaum's "three hollows" is the northerly Derrymore Glen, through which the Derrymore River runs, and which contains three scenic lakes, bounded by the steep valley walls of Baurtregaum and Caherconree and the peak of Gerhane 792 metres (2,598 ft). Also notable is the easterly Curraheen Glen, through which the Curraheen River runs, is bounded by the long easterly ridge from Baurtregaum to Baurtregaum Far NE Top.

Baurtregaum's prominence of 643 metres (2,110 ft) qualifies it as a Marilyn, and it also ranks it as the 6th-highest mountain in Ireland on the MountainViews Online Database, 100 Highest Irish Mountains, where the minimum prominence threshold is 100 metres.

== Hill walking ==
The popular route is the Derrymore Glen Horseshoe, a 11-kilometre 5-hour loop that starts from the base of the Derrymore Glen and ascends to the first summit of Gearhane 792 metres (2,598 ft), and then around the "horseshoe" to Caherconree and the summit of Baurtregaum. Options for the descent use either the Baurtregaum NW Top spur or the Baurtregaum NE Top Spur (and the Scragg) to get back to the base of the Glen. The route is recommended for its views of the Glen as well as incorporating most of the main peaks of the Slieve Mish range, and thus is also called The Slieve Mish Circuit in some guidebooks.

== Gallery ==
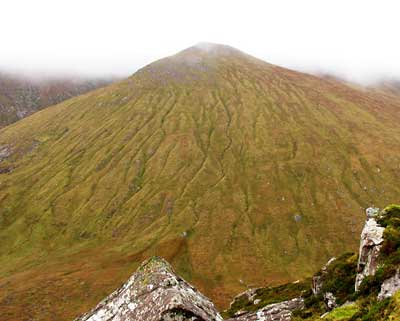
Baurtregaum NW Top

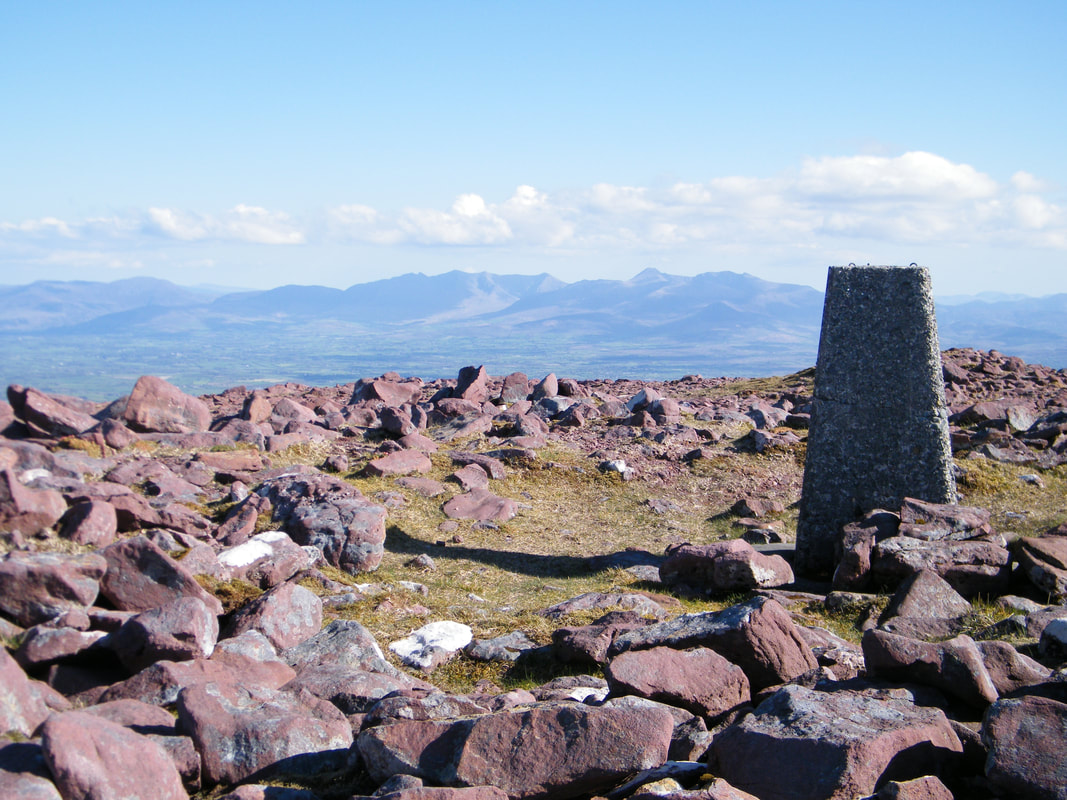
Baurtregaum summit

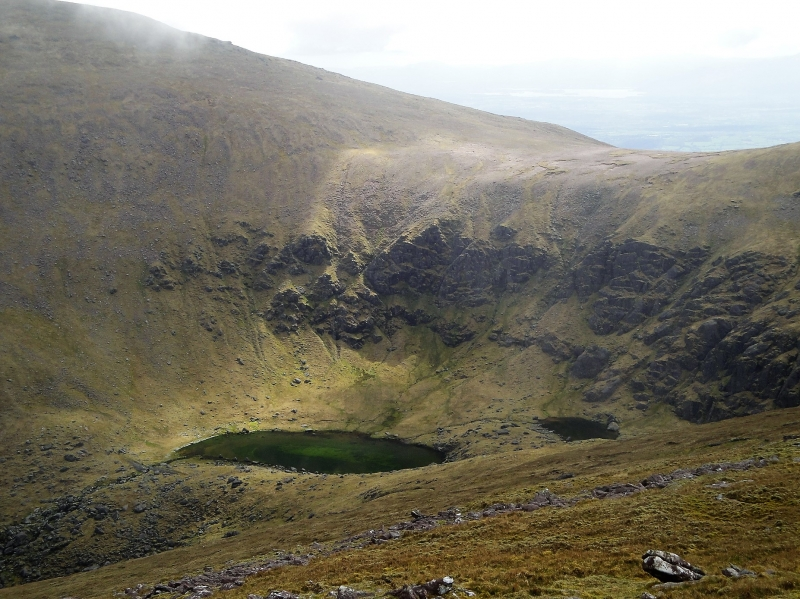
Lakes of Derrymore Glen

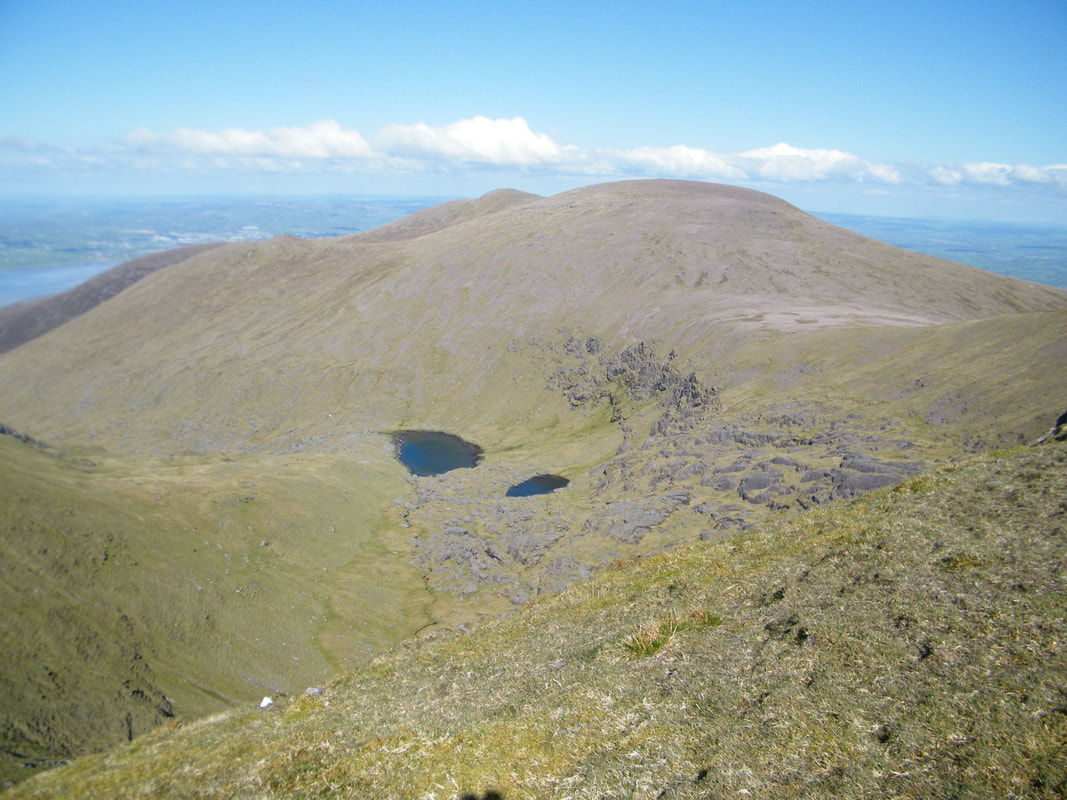
Baurtregaum from Caherconree

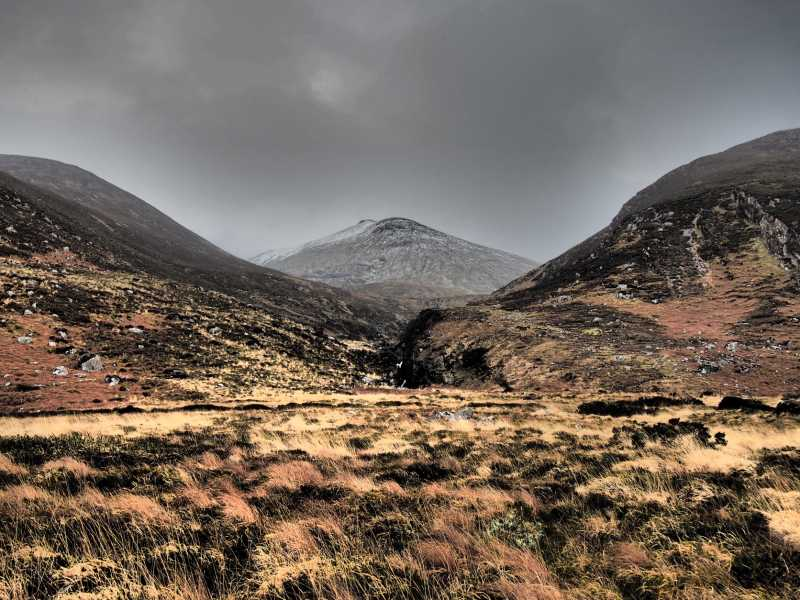
Baurtregaum NW Top

== Bibliography ==
- Fairbairn, Helen (2014). Ireland's Best Walks: A Walking Guide. Collins Press. ISBN 978-1848892118.
- MountainViews Online Database (Simon Stewart) (2013). A Guide to Ireland's Mountain Summits: The Vandeleur-Lynams & the Arderins. Collins Books. ISBN 978-1-84889-164-7.
- Dillion, Paddy (1993). The Mountains of Ireland: A Guide to Walking the Summits. Cicerone. ISBN 978-1852841102.

== See also ==
- Lists of mountains in Ireland
- List of mountains of the British Isles by height
- List of P600 mountains in the British Isles
- List of Marilyns in the British Isles
- List of Hewitt mountains in England, Wales and Ireland
