= Corin Akl Jáuregui =

Venezuelan composer, pianist, and educator

Corin Akl Jáuregui (born July 26, 1966) is a Venezuelan composer, pianist, and educator.

== Biography ==
A native of Caracas, Akl Jauregui began her studies at the Conservatorio Nacional de Música Juan José Landaeta in 1975. There she took music theory and solfeggio under Esther Calatrava, Carmen Defendini, and Rubén Alfonzo; she studied counterpoint, composition, and analysis with Juan Francisco Sans, and harmony with Violeta Lárez. At the Escuela de Música José Ángel Lamas she studied music history and aesthetics under Walter Guido, taking lessons in chamber music with Marisela González and Jaime Martinez. She has taught music at the Escuela de Música Ars Nova and Escuela de Música Pablo Castellanos in her native city. Her output consists largely of chamber music, including numerous works for piano. She has also worked at the National Library of Venezuela during her career.
