= Corinne Faut =

Belgian military personnel

Corinne Faut (born 10 May 1960) is a Belgian general. From 2009 to 2014, she was Director General of the Royal Higher Institute for Defence (Koninklijk Hoger Instituut voor Defensie), the highest military academy of the Belgian Army. She was promoted to Brigadier general in 2014. She was also appointed Director General of the Defense Communications Directorate.

She graduated in 1982 with a master's degree in aeronautical and military sciences from the Royal Military Academy. She worked in the staff of the Air Force on Human resources and on the long-term vision for the armed forces. She was appointed Lieutenant Colonel of the Air Force in December 2000. During her career, Faut worked at the Military Household of the King (Belgisch hof) under Albert II from 2002 to 2008.
