= Corinne Roche =

French writer (born 1957)

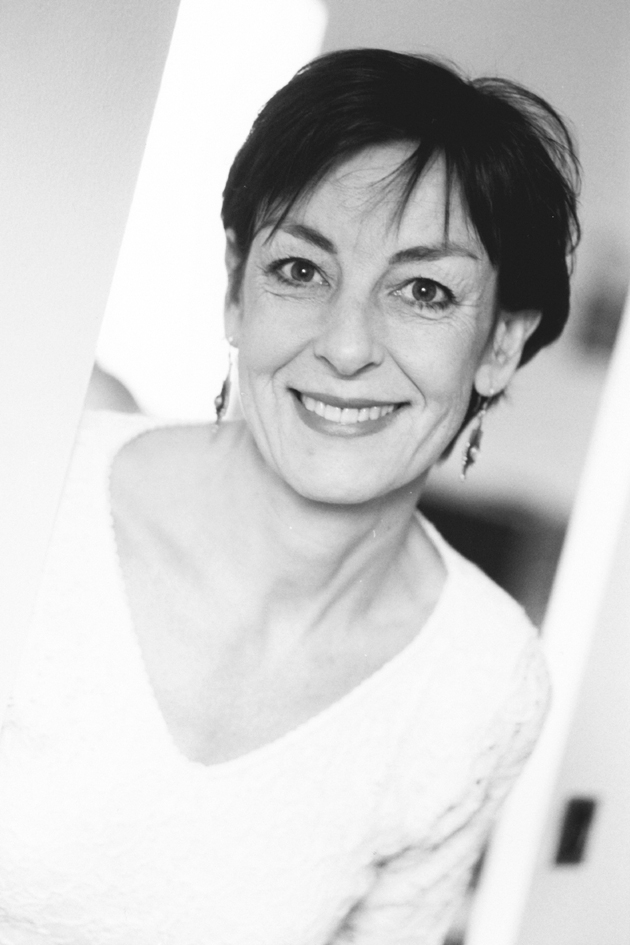
Corinne Roche

Corinne Roche is a French writer. She was born in Paris in 1957. She is the author of novels such as Une petite fête sur la planet (2003), Fred and Mathilde (2006), and Mazel tov, mister Poullaouec! (2008).

She lives on the island of Oléron.
