= Corin Hewitt =

American artist

Corin Hewitt (born 1971) is an American artist. His work has been shown widely in the U.S. as well as Europe. He has had several U.S. solo museum exhibitions including at the Whitney Museum of American Art, Museum of Contemporary Art Cleveland and Seattle Art Museum. Hewitt's work is held in the collections of the Whitney and Seattle Art Museum. He has been awarded a Joan Mitchell Foundation Grant, a 2011 Guggenheim Fellowship, and a 2014/15 Rome Prize. He is an Associate Professor of Sculpture and Extended Media at Virginia Commonwealth University.

== Education ==
Hewitt received a BA from Oberlin College and an MFA from Milton Avery School of Art at Bard College.

== Solo exhibitions ==
- Seed Stage, Whitney Museum of American Art, New York, 2008/2009
- SAM Next: Corin Hewitt, Seattle Art Museum, Seattle, 2009
- The Hedge, Museum of Contemporary Art Cleveland, 2013

== Awards ==
- 2010: Joan Mitchell Foundation Grant
- 2011/12: Guggenheim Fellowship
- 2014/15: Rome Prize

== Collections ==
Hewitt's work is held in the following permanent collection:

- Seattle Art Museum, Seattle: 22 prints (as of April 2021)
- Whitney Museum of American Art, New York: 75 prints and one installation (as of April 2021)
