= Austin Museum of Digital Art =

Digital Art museum in Austin, Texas

Austin Museum of Digital Art (AMODA)
- Established: 1997
- Location: Austin, Texas, United States
- Type: Digital Art Museum
- Website: Official website

The Austin Museum of Digital Art (AMODA) is a digital art museum located in Austin, Texas. AMODA was founded in 1997 by Harold Chaput, Samantha Krukowski and Chris Rankin. The project is funded and supported in part by a grant from the Texas Commission on the Arts and in part by the City of Austin Economic Development Department/Cultural Arts Division.

== History ==
The Austin Museum of Digital Art was founded by Harold Chaput, then a Computer Sciences doctoral student at the University of Texas at Austin (UT), and Christopher Rankin, an art history graduate of Trinity University and experienced museum worker. Rankin was dissatisfied with the state of the contemporary art scene in Austin. Chaput was connected to many artists and musicians employed in high tech positions who were looking for a creative outlet. By establishing an organization with the goals of supporting the production and exhibition of new work and encouraging discussion about the role of technology in current contemporary art, Chaput and Rankin hoped that they could encourage a community of artists, musicians, and technologists to create cutting-edge digital-based contemporary art.

They joined up with Samantha Krukowski, a member of UT's communications department. The three of them settled on a subsection of contemporary art that used computers in some form. They also agreed that the new organization should be a museum rather than a collective or a gallery, placing the emphasis on artistry and aesthetics rather than fashion and popularity. The Austin Museum of Digital Art was founded in November 1997.

Shortly after its founding, Rankin left AMODA because his new job working for the Texas Commission on the Arts posed a conflict of interest. Krukowski also left to become a Professor of Communications at UT. Rankin and Krukowski were replaced by Kyle Anderson, Jennifer Potter, Joel Stearns, Robert Turknett and Samuel Trim. Together with Chaput, this board moved AMODA from a museum on paper, to an art institution. They created AMODA's programs, including an educational program (2000), the Digital Showcase (2001), an exhibition series (2002), and a performance series (2003).
