= Corinne Cuéllar-Nathan =

Swiss painter

Corinne Cuéllar-Nathan (born 1958 in Zurich) is a Swiss painter.

== Life ==
Cuéllar-Nathan was born in Zurich into a family immersed in the world of art. Both her parents, Dr. Peter Nathan and Barbara Nathan-Neher, were art dealers and art collectors. In the mid 1980s she attended the City & Guilds of London Art School. Subsequently, she studied and completed her training at the Akademie für bildende Künste in Vienna, Austria. Her studies led her to become a paper restorer after further training in Italy. After 1997, however, painting became the central facet of her work.

== Art ==
Cuéllar-Nathan is famous for her landscape and cityscape paintings. She has travelled around the world with her easels and canvases, sometimes accompanied by sherpas, sometimes by family members and sometimes by mountaineers, but most of the time alone to places such as, Nepal, Spain, New York, Colombia, and Italy to find the right location and the right light. Always painted en plain air, her art is rooted in her search for perfection as well as her search for outstanding quality. The result is an effortless, atmospheric work that differs from one painting to the next. In her work, the perceiver and the perceived are over greater length of time an intertwined entity, constantly in communication in which traditional and moral values fade in and out of focus and ultimately marking the perceiver with a sense of serenity and sincerity, first captured with the eye and brush of the artist.

== Exhibitions ==
Corinne Cuéllar-Nathan has had solo exhibitions around the world.

- 2025 Zürich J & P Fine Art, Talstrasse 66, 8001 Zürich
- 2024 Zürich J & P Fine Art, Talstrasse 66, 8001 Zürich
- 2023 Zürich J & P Fine Art, Talstrasse 66, 8001 Zürich
- 2018 Zürich Salomon Cuéllar AG, Zähringerplatz 11, Zürich
- 2016 New York Michael Michael Altman Art Gallery, New York
- 2015 Zurich The Power of Landscapes: Horizons of the Eye an Mind, Art Cuéllar Nathan
- 2014 Basel Contemporary & Contemporary, Galerie Jean-Francois Heim
- 2013 Südtirol Art and Tradition, Schloss Churburg
- 2012 Paris La Mer, Galerie Didier Aaron
- 2012 Zurich Landscapes, Fine Art Zürich, Kongresshaus Zürich
- 2004 London Colour and Light, Colnaghi
- 2003 Austria The Alps, Schlosskammer in Maishofen
- 2003 Switzerland In Erinnerung an J. Neumayer, Unterengadin
- 2002 New York Vanitas, Jill Newhouse Gallery
- 2001 Zurich Industry and Nature: A Juxtraposition, Galerie Zäune
- 2000 Paris Lumière, Antione Béchet
- 1999 New York Land an Cityscapes, Jill Newhouse Gallery

== Catalogues ==
- Corinne Cuellar, The Power of Landscapes: Horizons of the Eye and Mind, Exhibition Catalogue
- Corinne Cuellar, Reflet d'Eau, Didier Aaron & Cie.
- Corinne Cuellar, Colour and Light, Colnaghi
- Corinne Cuellar, Lumière, Isabelle Renaud, Atelier Antoine Béchet, Exhibition Catalogue
