= Dutch National Rapporteur on Trafficking in Human Beings and Sexual Violence against Children =

The English language logo of the Dutch National Rapporteur on Trafficking in Human Beings and Sexual Violence against Children.

Dutch National Rapporteur on Trafficking in Human Beings and Sexual Violence against Children (established in 2000) reports the progress of combating human trafficking to the Dutch government.

== History ==
The Dutch Rapporteur was established in 2000 to report on the progress of the Dutch Government in combating human trafficking, producing its first report in 2002. The National Rapporteur, Mrs. Corinne Dettmeijer, reports to and is independent from the Dutch government. The National Rapporteur has published multiple reports on human trafficking, child pornography and sexual violence against children.

== Trafficking in Human Beings ==
Trafficking in human beings is punishable under Dutch Law. Trafficking in human beings does not only occur inside the sex industry, but can also be found in other economic sectors in which people are forced to work under such bad conditions and circumstances that human rights are infringed upon. Trafficking in human beings also includes the removal of organs and forced surrogacy.

== Sexual Violence against Children ==
Besides reporting on human trafficking, the National Rapporteur also reports on sexual violence against children in the Netherlands. Her latest report on this matter is entitled On Solid Ground and was published in 2014.

In April 2016, the Rapporteur wrote that "child marriages occur in the Netherlands" and indicated that "between September 2015 and January 2016 around 60 child brides entered the Netherlands."
