= Ethan Chorin =

American entrepreneur

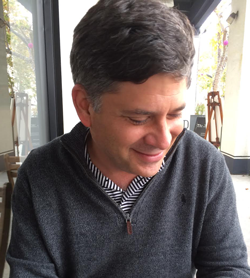
- Born: New York, New York
- Education: UC Berkeley; Stanford University; Yale University
- Known for: political analysis
- Website: ethanchorinauthor.com

Ethan Chorin is a Middle East and Africa-focused scholar and entrepreneur. He is known as a leading analyst of Libyan affairs, and for his applied development work in the Middle East and Africa in the area of environmental science and healthcare.

== Career ==
Chorin began his career as a business developer with Shell Oil. In 2004 he joined the U.S. Foreign Service, and was one of a small number of U.S. diplomats posted to Libya (2004–2006) immediately following the U.S. rapprochement with Gaddafi c. 2004. He served in Libya as the economic and commercial attaché from 2004 to 2006, and was subsequently posted to Washington, D.C. and the United Arab Emirates. From 2008 to 2011 he was senior manager for communications, and then government relations, at Dubai Ports World (DP World), and was head of the company's corporate social responsibility (CSR) program from 2009 to 2011.

Chorin returned to Libya in July, 2011 as co-founder of the 501c(3) non-profit Avicenna Group, to assist with post-revolutionary medical capacity-building. As part of this effort, he recruited Massachusetts General Hospital (MGH) to work with Benghazi Medical Center on a program to build trauma capacity in Benghazi. The MOU for this project was signed a day before the September 11, 2012 attack on the U.S. consulate in Benghazi. Ambassador Christopher Stevens, was to visit BMC to express support for the project the following day. Chorin has written several pieces on the impact of that attack on U.S. foreign policy in the region.

Chorin was a director at Berkeley Research Group (BRG) from 2012 to 2013, before founding Perim Associates, which advises international law firms and governments. As CEO of Perim Associates, Chorin created the 2015 ministerial East Africa Environmental Risk & Opportunity “ERO” Summit, held in Djibouti, and hosted by the President of the Republic of Djibouti. Yale University Climate and Energy Center played a prominent role in the conference, which was highlighted by Secretary of State John Kerry in a Djibouti press conference. He served as Sr. Advisor to the Ministry of Foreign Affairs of the United Arab Emirates, 2020–2021.

Chorin has spoken and testified on Libya before bodies such as the NATO Parliamentary Assembly and the U.S. Congress. He has been a frequent commentator on Libya for the BBC.

== Books ==
Chorin has written three books. Translating Libya is known as one of the most significant English language sources on Libyan short fiction. It is a collection of translations of 16 short stories set in various locations in Libya, interspersed with Chorin's travelogue and social commentary. Darf Publishers published an expanded edition in 2015 with a foreword by Libyan novelist Ahmed Ibrahim Fagih.”

Chorin’s second book, Exit the Colonel: The Hidden History of the Libyan Revolution, traces the origins of the 2011 Libyan Revolution. Libya historian Dirk Vandewalle called Exit The Colonel “undoubtedly . . . the best analytical work on Libya and its revolution for a very long time. Middle East constitutional lawyer and ex-Lebanese presidential candidate Chibli Mallat noted that Chorin had “reconstructed the murky events (of the first few days of the Revolution) in remarkable detail."

His most recent book is Benghazi! A New History of the Fiasco that Pushed America and Its World to the Brink, which provides the broader context for and details the larger causes and long-term consequences of the 2012 attack on the US diplomatic mission in Benghazi, Libya.

== Education and awards ==
Chorin holds a PhD from UC Berkeley in agricultural and resource economics (2000). Chorin received a master's degree from Stanford University in international policy studies (1993) and a bachelor's degree from Yale University in Near Eastern literature and civilizations (1991), cum laude, with distinction in the major.

Chorin was a Fulbright Fellow in Amman, Jordan (1994–1995), an IIE Fulbright Hays Doctoral Research Fellow in Aden, Yemen (1998–1999), and a Jean Monnet Fellow at the Ecole Polytechnique, France (1993–1994)

Chorin has been a social enterprise fellow at the Yale School of Management (SOM) (2012), a non-resident fellow at the Dubai School of Government (2009–2011), He was a member of the 2008 Obama campaign's Foreign Policy Advisory Group. He was recipient of a U.S. Department of State Meritorious Honor Award for his work in Libya, and a Sinclaire Award for language achievement in Persian

Chorin was born New York City, and grew up in Berkeley, California. He is the son of mathematician Alexander Joel Chorin and Alice Jones Chorin.

== Books authored ==
- Chorin, Ethan (2008). Translating Libya. PublicAffairs. p. 238. ISBN 978-0863566479.
- Chorin, Ethan (2012). Exit the Colonel. Saqi Books-SOAS. pp. 384. ISBN 978-1610391719.
- Chorin, Ethan (2022). Benghazi! A New History of the Fiasco that Pushed America and its World to the Brink. Hachette Books. ISBN 978-0306829727.

== Articles ==
- Chorin, Ethan, Benghazi's Karmic Revenge - FORBES Nov 20, 2016
- Chorin, Ethan, “Articulating a Dubai Model of Development: The Case of Djibouti, Dubai School of Government, 2010 (monograph)
- Chorin, Ethan, NATO’s Libya Intervention and the continued case for a Responsibility to Rebuild, in In Boston University International Law Journal, Summer, 2013.
- Chorin, Ethan, The Future of the U.S.-Libya Commercial Relationship, in Vandewalle, Dirk, Libya since 1969: Qadhafi’s Revolution Revisited, Palgrave-MacMillan, 2008: New York
- Chorin, Ethan, “What Libya Lost”, in the New York Times, September 13, 2012.
- Chorin, Ethan, "The Deeper Blame for Benghazi.” In the New York Times, May 14, 2013.
- Chorin, Ethan “The New Danger in Benghazi”, in the New York Times, May 28, 2014.
- Chorin, Ethan, “The New Pirates of Libya” in Foreign Policy, March 2, 2015.
- Chorin, Ethan, The U.S. Commercial Guide to Libya, U.S. Department of State, U.S. Department of Commerce, 2006
- Chorin, Ethan, "The Graffiti of Benghazi", in Words Without Borders, July, 2011.
- Chorin, Ethan, “New Government May Cause Splits”, in Prospect Magazine, August 14, 2015.
- Chorin, Ethan, “Setting the Record Straight on Benghazi”, in Foreign Affairs, February 10, 2010.
- Chorin, Ethan, “A Curious Twist of Fate for Libya and its Rogue General.” Forbes, December 22, 2015.
- Homeless rats: A parable for postrevolution Libya | wordswithoutborders.org
