= Corinne Philpott =

Northern Irish judge

Her Honour Corinne Philpott

Recorder of Derry
- In office 2002–2008

Personal details
- Born: 1954
- Died: 17 June 2016 (aged 62)
- Education: Queen's University Belfast

Corinne Philpott (1954 – 17 June 2016) was a Northern Irish judge. She practised law in Northern Ireland upon her appointment as the first female County Court Judge in 1998.

== Biography ==
Philpott graduated from Queen's University Belfast, Judge Philpott was called to the Bar in December 1977 and took silk in December 1993. She was one of the first women Queen’s Counsel. Philpott was Northern Ireland's first female County Court judge. From 1993 to 1998 she was a Deputy County Court judge. She was Recorder of Derry from 2002 until 2008 and was made Deputy Recorder of Belfast in 2012. As a judge she dealt with various cases in Northern Ireland. Some high profile cases include that of Liam Adams and Colin Howell.

Philpott died in 2016 following a long illness. She was 62. She was described as a "trailblazer" in the legal profession. Her funeral was held on 22 June 2016. In 2017, the Institute of Professional Legal Studies was asked to create a graduate prize in her name.

== See also ==
- List of first women lawyers and judges in Europe
