= Corinne Dettmeijer =

Dutch lawyer

C.E. (Corinne) Dettmeijer-Vermeulen (The Hague, 1949) is a Dutch lawyer. She was Dutch National Rapporteur on Trafficking in Human Beings and Sexual Violence against Children, in Netherlands from 1 January 2006 to 15 November 2017 . Dettmeijer succeeded Anna Korvinus, who was appointed as the first National Rapporteur on 1 April 2000, and was succeeded by Herman Bolhaar herself in 2017.

In 2024, Dettmeijer was re-elected to serve on the Committee on the Elimination of All Forms of Discrimination Against Women (CEDAW) for the term 2025-2028. She currently serves as the Vice Chair of the Committee on the Elimination of All Forms of Discrimination Against Women that is based in Geneva, Switzerland.

== Education ==
In 1973 Dettmeijer obtained her master's degree in law at Leiden University.

== Career ==
From 1980 to 1985, Dettmeijer was a Director of Public Prosecutions at the district prosecutor's office in Rotterdam. After 1985 she worked as a juvenile judge from 1985 to 1995. she also served as the vice president of the court in The Hague from 1995 to 2014. Dettmeijer was decorated as an Officer in the Order of Orange-Nassau on November 13, 2017.
