= Corinne Trang =

- Born: Blois, France
- Occupations: teacher, author, chef, yoga instructor
- Known for: Culinary Arts and cook book author
- Website: corinnetrang.com

Corinne Trang is an author of Asian-themed cookbooks.

== Early life and career ==
Born in the Loire Valley of France to a French mother and Cambodian-Chinese father, Trang was raised in Phnom Penh, Cambodia, Paris, France, and New York City.

Trang wrote for publications as Food & Wine, Health, Cooking Light, and Saveur, where she held the positions of test kitchen director and producing editor from 1996 to 1998.

Her first cookbook, Authentic Vietnamese Cooking: Food from a Family Table (1999), won awards such as "Best Book on Asian Cuisine in English" and "Best Asian Cuisine Book in the World" from the Gourmand World Cookbook Awards and Food & Wine's "Best of the Best of 1999". It was also awarded Best of the Best of 1999 by Food & Wine magazine.

Trang's subsequent cookbooks included Essentials of Asian Cuisine (Simon & Schuster, Feb. 2003), The Asian Grill (Chronicle Books, 2006), A Food Lover’s Companion: Vietnamese (Mark & Spencer, 2007), and Noodles Every Day (Chronicle Books, 2009).

In addition to writing her own cookbooks, Trang has contributed to others including Curry Cuisine (Dorling Kindersley, 2007), Saveur Cooks Authentic American (Chronicle Books, 1998), Saveur Cooks Authentic French (Chronicle Books, 1999), and The Encyclopedia of Food & Culture (Scribners & Sons, 2003).

== Media appearances ==
She is chief East Coast USA correspondent for America’s Dining and Travel Guide (Business Talk Radio). She has also appeared on many other radio and television shows.

== Teaching ==
From 2000 to 2004, Trang served as an adjunct associate professor in the Hospitality Management Department of her alma mater, Drexel University in Philadelphia. She also made appearances as a guest critic and lecturer at the Casa Malaparte Foundation in Florence and Capri, Italy; Massachusetts Museum of Contemporary Art in North Adams, MA; California College of Arts & Crafts in San Francisco, CA; University of the Arts in Philadelphia, PA; Rhode Island School of Design in Providence, RI; University of Applied Sciences in Cologne, Germany; New York University in New York, NY; and the Center for Health and The Global Environment at Harvard Medical School.

Since 2005, she teaches food writing at New York University and University of Texas at Austin, and culinary workshops at Syracuse University. She also serves on the Board of Directors of Cook for Your Life, a non-profit organization dedicated to teaching cancer survivors' proper nutrition through fun hands-on cooking programs.

== Health and wellness ==
Trang is a wellness coach focusing on mindful eating, incorporating yoga to help clients engage in healthy eating habits in order to maintain a healthy lifestyle. She is a certified yoga instructor.

== Other activities ==
In addition to writing and teaching, Trang is a food and beverage consultant, spokesperson, and brand and commodity consultant who has styled, photographed, and produced food and travel stories for lifestyle publications and books. She is also the founder of a hybrid wellness program incorporating yoga and meditation to help individuals connect to the Self by exploring food and the art of eating mindfully.

== Selected publications ==
=== Books ===
- Authentic Vietnamese Cooking: Food from a Family Table, 1999 ISBN 978-0-684-86444-0
- Essentials of Asian Cuisine: Fundamentals and Favorite Recipes, 2003 ISBN 978-0-7432-0312-8
- Curry Cuisine (co-authored with David Thompson, Sri Owen, and Vivek Singh), 2006 ISBN 978-0-7566-2078-3
- The Asian Grill: Great Recipes, Bold Flavors, 2006 ISBN 978-0-8118-4631-8
- Vietnamese : A Culinary Journey of Discovery, 2007 ISBN 978-1-4054-9564-6
- Noodles every day : delicious Asian recipes from Ramen to rice sticks, 2009 ISBN 978-0-8118-6143-4
- Asian Flavors Diabetes Cookbook, 2012, Alexandria : American Diabetes Association. ISBN 978-1-58040-450-1
