= Stanford Art Spaces =

Stanford Art Spaces was an art exhibition program at Stanford University in Stanford, California, United States. It ran from 1985 - 2016. Stanford Art Spaces was sponsored by Stanford University's Center for Integrated Systems. Art was exhibited in the Paul G. Allen Building, the David W. Packard Electrical Engineering Building, and smaller venues located throughout the Stanford campus. New exhibitions were installed every few months.

The curator of Stanford Art Spaces was DeWitt Cheng. Cheng is a Contributing Editor for Art Ltd. magazine and his reviews have appeared in numerous other publications such as Artillery, East Bay Express, and Visual Art Source.

Following the closure of the Stanford Art Spaces program, SLAC National Accelerator Laboratory and a few other Stanford University venues have continued with rotating art exhibitions curated by DeWitt Cheng.
