= Corinne Heline =

Christian occultist

- Born: August 18, 1882; Atlanta, Georgia
- Died: July 26, 1975 (aged 92); Santa Monica, California
- Occupation: Christian occultist

Corinne Heline (née Smith) (aka Corinne Dunklee, Corinne S. Dunklee, and Corinne S. Dunklee Heline) (August 18, 1882 in Atlanta, Georgia – July 26, 1975) was an American author, Christian mystic, and occultist who published 28 books.

== Biography ==
Born to the well-to-do Duke family, part of the aristocracy of the Old South, she received a large inheritance at age 16 that allowed her to self-publish her works.

Heline received a classical and religious education. She was a lifelong student of the ancient mysteries. Her first husband was Carl M. Dunklee (died before 1920), whom she married in Denver, Colorado on July 19, 1911. Her second husband was New Age pioneer Theodore Heline (John Theodore Heline) (August 14, 1883 - February 15, 1971), whom she met at Mount Ecclesia (headquarters of The Rosicrucian Fellowship in Oceanside, California), and whom she married sometime in the period 1940–1942. Rosicrucian initiate Max Heindel (pen-name of Carl Louis von Grasshoff) (1865–1919), founder of The Rosicrucian Fellowship, became her teacher at Mount Ecclesia. Theodore undertook the publication of her mystical and occult writings.

Her magnum opus, titled New Age Bible Interpretation (7 vols.) (1935–1961), was accompanied by many other works interpreting the ancient wisdom. She is known worldwide among students of esotericism and occultism, and also in New Age circles as a pioneer. She is credited as being one of the first occult writers to use the term "New Age" in the context used by the movement. In 1940, Heline founded a quarterly magazine the New Age Interpreter. It was one of the earliest new age magazines to be published. Heline was an advocate of chromotherapy (colour healing) and authored two books on the topic, Healing and Regeneration Through Color (1943) and Color and Music in the New Age (1964).

In 1948, Heline authored Esoteric Music Based on the Musical Seership of Richard Wagner. The book gives a mystical interpretation of Richard Wagner's music dramas. Heline joined the New Age Bible and Philosophy Center at Santa Monica, California, which took the motto "Devoted to studies designed to aid the modern seeker to a spiritual reorientation in the Light of the Ancient Wisdom." Heline lectured on occult topics. In 1949, she lectured on angels and fairies in Los Angeles.

== Vegetarianism ==
Heline was a vegetarian for ethical and spiritual reasons. In 1947, she was a speaker at the Calgary Unit of the Canadian Vegetarian Association. She argued that it was not God's plan for humans to eat the flesh of animals and that this was the cause of many diseases. She argued for animal protectionism and urged vegetarians to convince others that it is "harmful to serve the broken and mutilated bodies of animals as food on our tables".

== Writings ==
- Magnum opus
  - New Age Bible Interpretation (1954)
    - Old Testament: Vol I Five Books of Moses and Joshua; Vol II Part I. Solomon and the Temple Builders – Part II. Books of Initiation; Vol III Part I. The Promise – Part II. The Preparation
    - New Testament: Vol IV Preparation for Coming of the Light of the World; Vol V The Christ and His Mission; Vol VI The Work of the Apostles and Paul and Book of Revelation (The Three Degrees of Discipleship); Vol VII Mystery of the Christos (The Harp of David, The Twelve Holy Days)
- Other books on Bible interpretation
  - Tarot and the Bible
  - Mythology and the Bible
  - Mystic Masonry and the Bible
  - Occult Anatomy and the Bible (New Birth Through Regeneration])
  - The Bible and the Stars
  - Sacred Science of Numbers
  - Questions and Answers on Bible Enigmas
  - Supreme Initiation of the Blessed Virgin
  - Blessed Virgin Mary, her Life & Mission
- Other Books
  - Magic Gardens
  - Star Gates
  - Color & Music in the New Age
  - Music: The Keynote of Human Evolution
  - The Cosmic Harp; Healing; Regeneration through Color & Music
  - Esoteric Music of Richard Wagner
  - Beethoven's Nine Symphonies: Correlated with the Nine Spiritual Mysteries
  - The Twelve Labors of Hercules
  - Mysteries of the Holy Grail
  - Lenten Pearls
  - The Moon in Occult Lore
  - The Bible: Wonder Books of the Ages
- Essays
  - The Language of Flowers – Peace: A Legend of the Golden Rod
  - Songs of Initiation
  - The Knights Templar
  - The Symbolism of The Androgynous Man
  - The White Rose – A Legend of Holy Night
  - Zodiacal Signatures in the Ten Commandments
  - Discipleship – The Five Followers: The Fellowship Degree
  - Solomon – Revelations of Truth
  - The Autumn Equinox – Its Spiritual Significance

== See also ==
- Esoteric Christianity
