= Slieve Mish Mountains =

Mountain range in County Kerry, Ireland

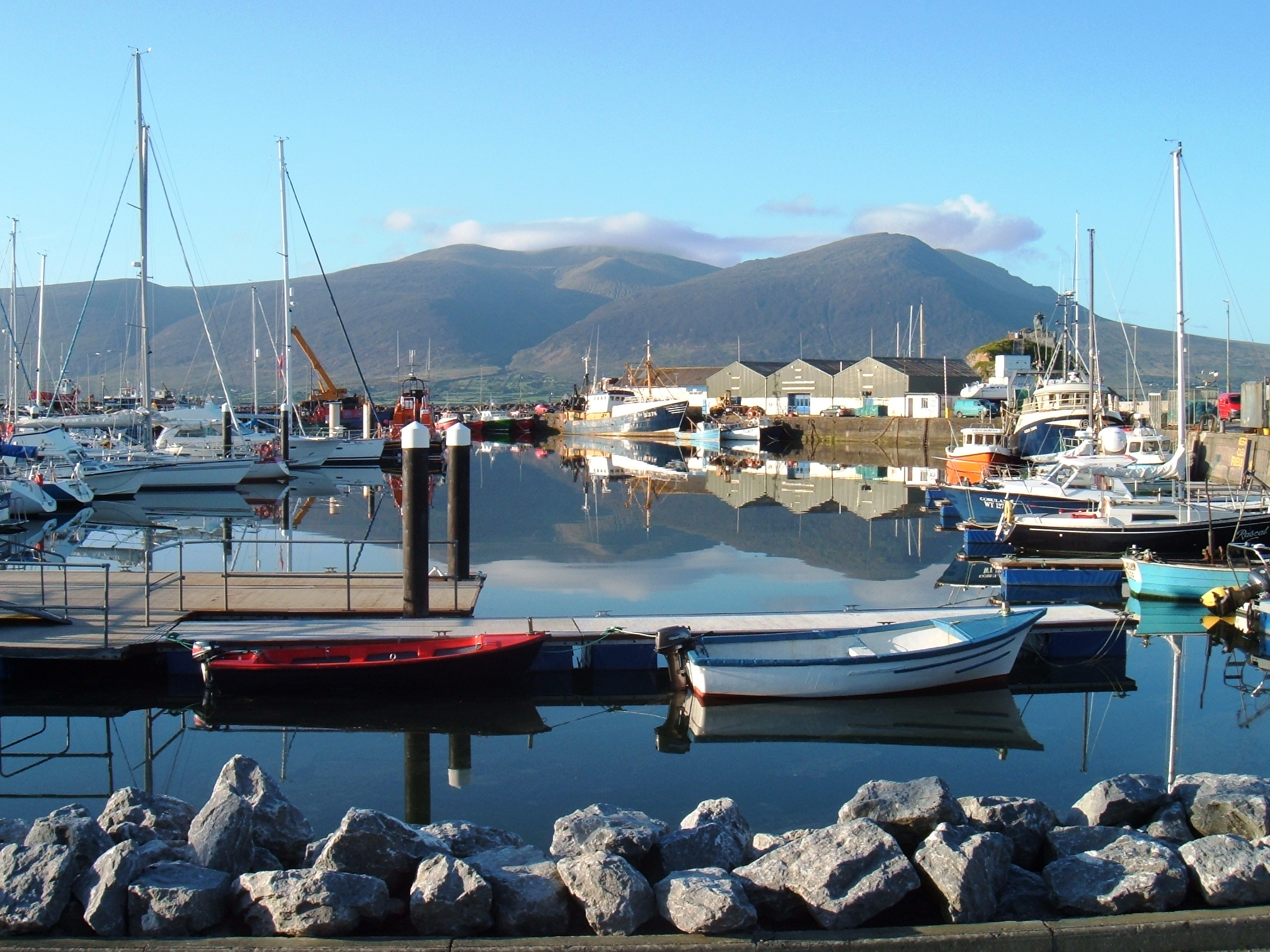
- Slieve Mish Mountains from across the Tralee Bay in the village of Fenit

Highest point
- Peak: Baurtregaum
- Elevation: 851 m (2,792 ft)
- Coordinates: 52°12′N 9°46′W

Dimensions
- Length: 19 km (12 mi) East–West
- Width: 6 km (3.7 mi)
- Area: 97.9 km^{2} (37.8 mi^{2})

Naming
- Native name: Sliabh Mis
- English translation: [possibly] mountains of Mis

Geography
- Location within island of Ireland
- Location: County Kerry
- Country: Ireland
- Provinces of Ireland: Munster
- Topo map: OSI Discovery 71

Geology
- Rock age: Ordovician to Late Carboniferous
- Rock type: Purple cross-bedded sandstone

Slieve Mish Mountains (Irish: Sliabh Mis, meaning '[possibly] mountains of Mis'), is a predominantly sandstone mountain range at the eastern end of the Dingle Peninsula in County Kerry, Ireland. Stretching 19 kilometres (12 miles), from the first major peak of Barnanageehy outside of Tralee in the east, to Cnoc na Stuaice near Central Dingle in the west, the range has over 17 material peaks (e.g. height above 100 m), with the core of the mountain range based around the massif of its highest peak, Baurtregaum, and its deep glacial valleys of Derrymore Glen and Curraheen Glen.

== Naming ==
The Irish language term "Sliabh" denotes a mountain, however, the precise meaning of "Mis" has not been validated. Irish academic Paul Tempan notes that it could be related to Slemish mountain in County Antrim, where the term "Mis" is from a female name, and thus translates as "the mountains of Mis".

== Geology ==
Like many of the mountain ranges in County Kerry, such as the MacGillycuddy Reeks in the Iveragh Peninsula, the Slieve Mish Mountains are composed predominantly of Devonian period Old Red Sandstone, with a band of Ordovician period metasediments on the western slopes of the range.

The rocks of the Slieve Mish Mountains and the Brandon Group in the Dingle Peninsula are Ordovician to Late Carboniferous in age, 485 to 330 millions years ago (Ma).

At the time Ireland was in a hot equatorial setting. During a 60 million year period, Ireland was the site of a major basin, known as the Munster basin, and Cork and Kerry were effectively a large alluvial floodplain.

The rocks in the Dinge Peninsula have an earlier, Silurian, shallow marine facies and a later, Devonian, continental red-bed facies. The transition between the two is unconformable or faulted. The island of Inishnabro just off the peninsula is an exception in the area in that the contact between the two facies is conformable.

The rocks are purple–red due to the oxidation of iron-rich sediments which accumulated in semi-arid climate. In places they are green from chlorination. These colours are still visible today. There are virtually no fossils in Old Red Sandstone. The composition of Old Red Sandstone is variable. Largely fluvial sandstones and conglomerates dominate and there are mudstones, siltstones. Boulders containing quartz pebbles are visible throughout the range.

The Palaeozoic rocks of the Dinge Peninsula have been affected by deformations caused by three orogenies (mountain building events) the Early Caledonian (c. 470 Ma) Acadian (c. 400 Ma) and Variscan (c. 318–297 Ma) orogenies. The Variscan orogeny uplifted and deformed the Devonian and Early Carboniferous rocks, tightened the folds of the Caledonian and Acadian orogenies and reactivated many of the older major faults. Very large NE-SE trending (in the west) and E-W trending (in the east) open upright folds were created in the Dinge Peninsula. The Slieve Mish Anticline in the east provides evidence of this. The erosional products of this were deposited in the Munster Basin.

The Slieve Mish range was also subject to significant glaciation with corries (e.g. the upper lakes of the Derrymore Glen), U-shaped valleys (e.g. the Derrymore Glen and the Curraheen Glen), however the range does not have the sharp rocky arêtes and ridges of the MacGillycuddy Reeks range.

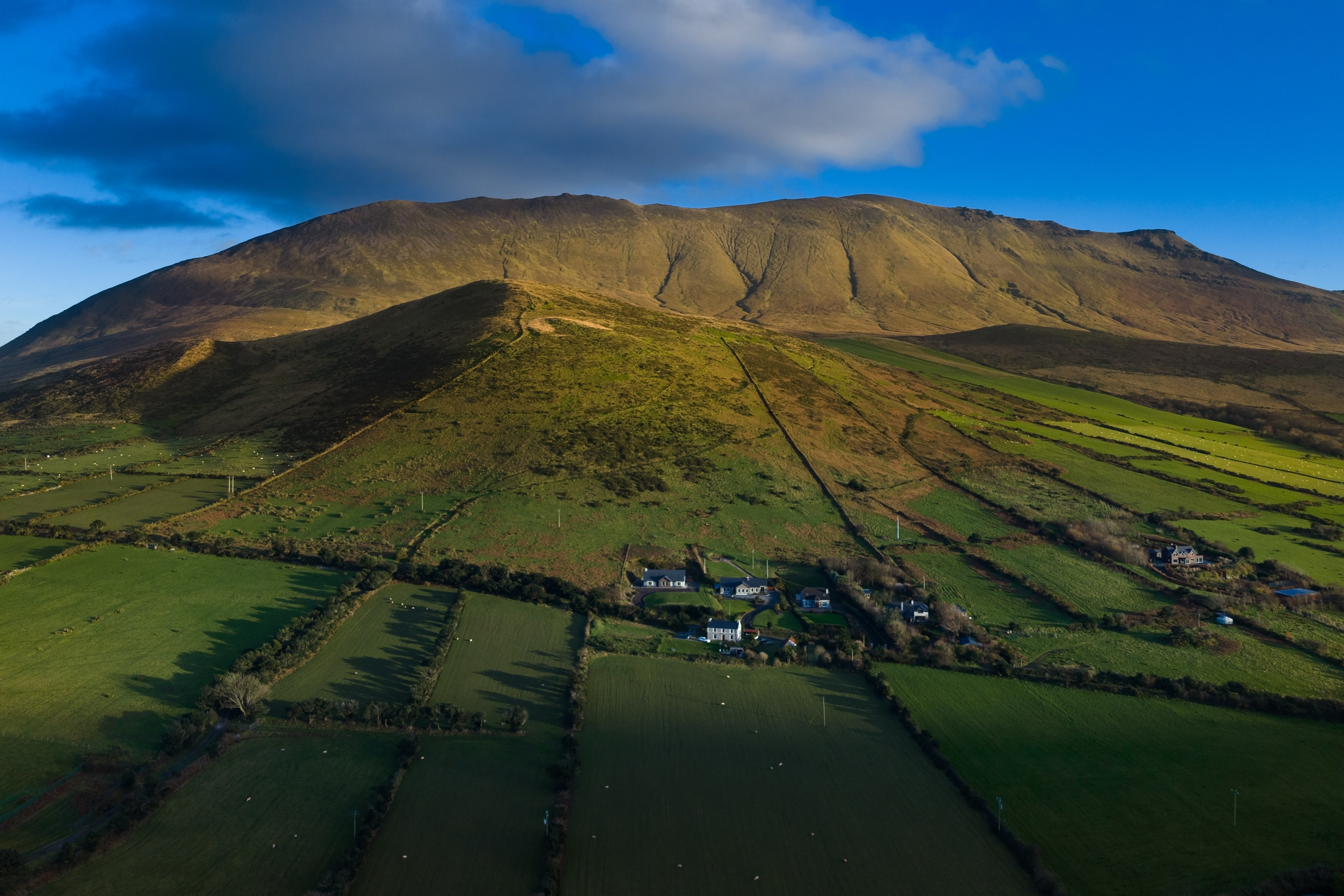
Western view of the Slieve ranges. Gearhane (Géarán) to the left, and Caherconree (Cathair Con Raoi) to the right. Also, Cruckglass (the smaller hill closer to foreground) visible

== Geography ==
Overlooking Tralee Bay on the northern side and Dingle Bay on the south, the range extends for 19 kilometres from just outside Tralee in the east to the centre of the Dingle Peninsula in the west. The range is often described as the "backbone" of the Dingle Peninsula because of distribution of most of its major peaks along narrow south-west to north-east "spine" that extends to 6 kilometres at its widest part.

The core of the range is the massif of its highest point Baurtregaum 851 metres (2,792 ft), and the main peaks of the range sit and Baurtregaum's high grassy ridge from Baurtregaum Far NW Top 603 metres (1,978 ft)in the east, to Caherconree 835 metres (2,740 ft), and Gearhane 792 metres (2,598 ft), in the west.

Bautregaum has two major glacial U-shaped valleys, the long 4.5-kilometre easterly Curraheen Glen (with the Curraheen River), and the shorter but deeper northerly Derrymore Glen (Derrymore River), with its three corrie lakes.

After descending to the north–south mountain pass of Bóthar na gCloch ("road of the stones") to the west, the spine of the range rises up again at Knockbrack 459 metres (1,506 ft) and Lack Mountain 465 metres (1,526 ft), to run in a further south-westerly direction to finish at Cnoc na Stuaice 483 metres (1,585 ft).

== List of peaks ==
The following is a download from the MountainViews Online Database, who list 17 identifiable Slieve Mish peaks with an elevation, or height, above 100 metres

Marilyn: Any height, and prominence over 150 metres (492 ft).

Peaks of the Slieve Mish Mountain range (MountainViews Online Database, July 2019)
Height Rank	Prom. Rank	Name	Irish Name (if different)	Translation	Height (m)	Prom. (m)	Height (ft)	Prom. (ft)	Topo Map	OSI Grid Reference
1	1	Baurtregaum	Barr Trí gCom	Top of Three Hollows (Note: The three hollows in question are probably the valleys of Derrymore, Derryquay and Curraheen, which cut into the sides of the mountain.)	851	643	2,792	2,110	71	Q749076
2	4	Caherconree	Cathair Conraoi	Cú Roí's Stone Fort (Note: Caherconree is named after a stone fort situated two-thirds of the way up its western flank, overlooking the mountain road called Bóthar na gCloch ('road of the stones'). This is an inland promontory-fort, consisting of a natural projecting ledge surrounded on three sides by steep cliffs, the fourth side being defended by a stone wall.)	835	129	2,740	423	71	Q733073
3	17	Baurtregaum NE Top	—	—	819	14	2,687	46	71	Q755081
4	16	Gearhane	An Géarán	The Fang (Note: Between Gearhane and the summit of Caherconree are two rock features known as Finn Mac Cool's Table and Finn Mac Cool's Chair.)	792	17	2,598	56	71	Q733082
5	15	Baurtregaum NW Top	—	—	723	18	2,372	59	71	Q747084
6	12	Baurtregaum Far NE Top	—	—	603	28	1,978	92	71	Q768090
7	11	Castle Hill (Note: As this peak is rather far from any castle (at Castledrum or Castlemaine), it may be simply named from its commanding position.)	—	—	600	35	1,969	115	71	Q756063
8	6	Caherbla	Cathair Bhláth	Stone Fort of Flowers (Note: An Seabhac reports hearing from a shanachee that the correct name was Cathair Bhláthnaide, 'Bláthnaid's stone fort'. Bláthnaid was the daughter of the king of the Isle of Man. Cú Chulainn and Cú Roí fell out over who would have her hand. See also Caherconree.)	586	91	1,923	299	71	Q724052
9	2	Moanlaur	Móin Láir	Middle Bog	566	289	1,857	948	71	Q690045
10	14	Knockmore	An Cnoc Mór	The Big Hill	565	27	1,854	89	71	Q684042
11	7	Barnanageehy	Bearna na Gaoithe	Gap of the wind (Note: This is one of the most common names for a pass in Ireland. The name is actually marked on lower peaks to the E, and it seems likely that the gap in question is even further to the E.)	561	56	1,841	184	71	Q800082
12	8	Beenduff	An Bhinn Dubh	The Black Peak	515	40	1,690	131	71	Q677037
13	13	Cnoc na Stuaice (Note: Also recorded as "Emlagh".)	Cnoc na Stuaice	Hill of the Peak	483	28	1,585	92	71	Q666029
14	9	Lack Mountain	Sliabh na Lice	Mountain of the Flagstone	465	40	1,526	131	71	Q706045
15	10	Knockbrack	An Cnoc Breac	The Speckled Hill	459	36	1,506	118	71	Q702051
16	5	Corrin	Carraig Tomáisín	Little Thomas's Rock	332	97	1,089	318	71	Q685075
17	3	Knockafeehane	Binn an Phréacháin	Peak of the Crows	301	130	988	427	71	Q616014

== See also ==
- Lists of mountains in Ireland
- List of mountains of the British Isles by height
- List of P600 mountains in the British Isles
- List of Marilyns in the British Isles
- List of Hewitt mountains in England, Wales and Ireland
