= Corinne Vezzoni =

French architect (born 1964)

Corinne Vezzoni (born 21 March 1964) is a French architect.

She was born in Arles and was educated at the École nationale supérieure d'architecture de Marseille. Vezzoni founded Agence Corinne Vezzoni & Associés at Marseille in 2000.

Vezzoni is an instructor in planning and development at the University of Provence. She also teaches at the École polytechnique universitaire de Marseille.

In 2015, she was awarded the Prix Femmes Architectes. Vezzoni was named a Chevalier in the Ordre des Arts et des Lettres.

== Selected projects ==
- Archives et bibliothèque départementales Gaston Defferre
- Centre de conservation et de ressources of the Museum of European and Mediterranean Civilisations
- Lycée Haute Qualité Environnementale at Vence
- La Fourragère metro station at Marseille
