= Corinne Gendron =

Canadian researcher

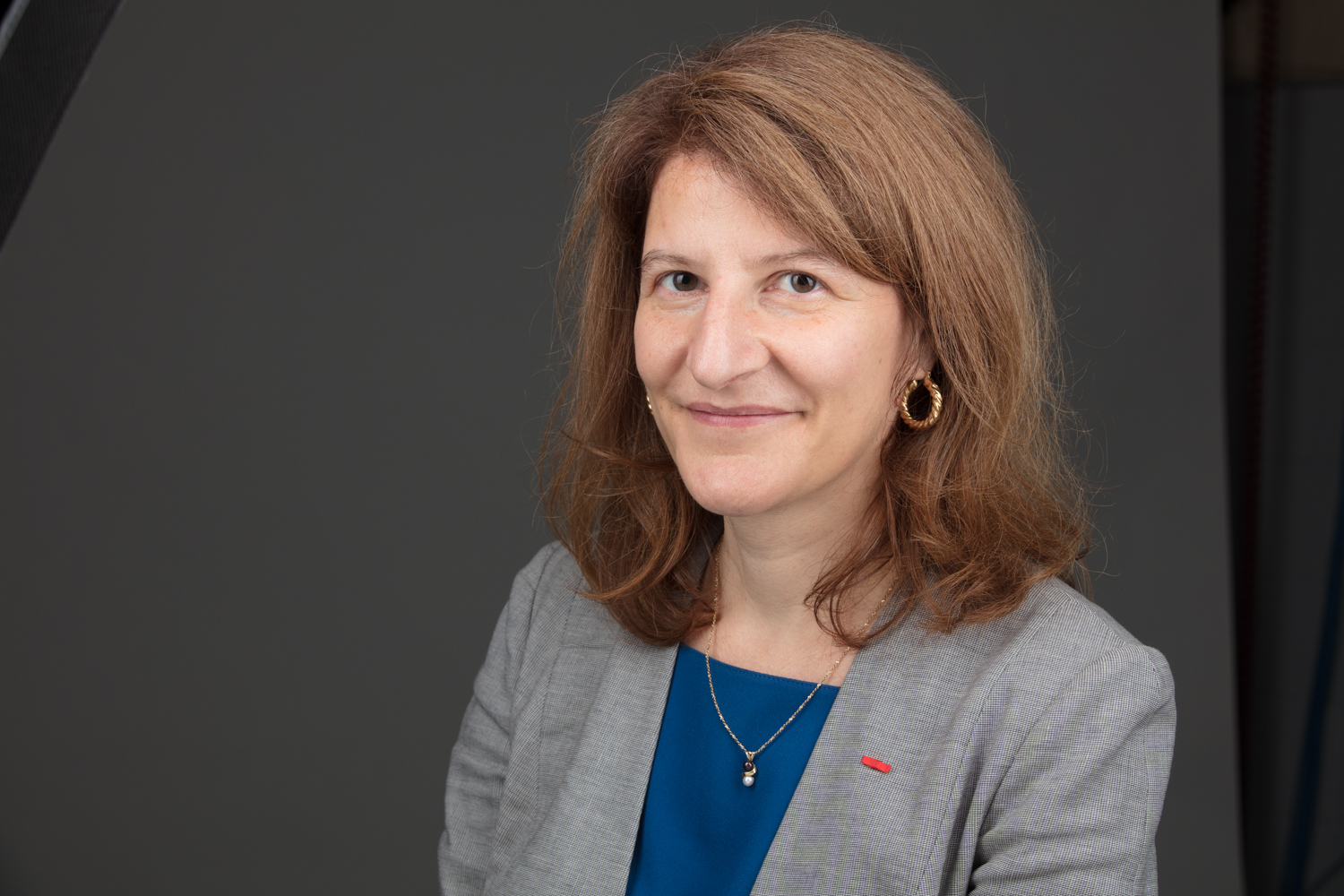
- Born: 1968 (age 57–58)
- Education: Université du Québec à Montréal (Ph.D.)
- Occupations: Professor, sociologist

Corinne Gendron (b.1968) is a Québécoise scholar, researcher, lawyer and sociologist, specializing in new forms of economic regulation and sustainable development. Gendron holds the Chair of Social Responsibility and Sustainable Development from the Université du Québec à Montréal, where she is a professor in the Department of Strategy, Social and Environmental Responsibility of the School of Management Sciences. She is a member of the Académie des technologies and a Chevalier of the French Legion of Honour.

== Biography ==
In the 1990s, Gendron spent a summer at an environmentally-focused holiday camp, which was her starting point for an interest in sustainable development. Gendron entered the Université de Montréal in 1986 and earned a bachelor's degree in law in 1989. She passed the bar in 1990, completed an MBA in 1993, and a Ph.D. in sociology in 2000 at the Université du Québec à Montréal.

Gendron is one of the founders of the RSE (French: Responsabilité sociale des entreprises, transl. corporate social responsibility) at the École de Montréal, which developed the New Economic Social Movement (NMSE). Through numerous scientific publications, she has contributed research on the process of institutionalizing the movements of fair trade, socially responsible investment and engaged consumerism in various sectors. Since May 2011, she has been a member of the Government of Quebec's Shale Gas Strategic Environmental Assessment Committee.

On 10 December 2014 Gendron was elected a member of the French Académie des technologies. By decree of the President of the Republic dated 31 December 2015, Corinne Gendron was elevated to the rank of Chevalier (knight) of the National Order of the Legion of Honour by the Ministry of National Education, Higher Education and Research for France.

== Bibliography ==
- Gendron, C.; Vaillancourt, J.-G.; Audet, R. (2010). Développement durable et responsabilité sociale. De la mobilisation à l'institutionnalisation [Sustainable development and social responsibility. From Mobilization to Institutionalization] (in French). Montréal: Presses Internationales Polytechnique. p. 284.
- Gendron, Corinne (2009). Quel commerce équitable pour demain [What fair trade for tomorrow] (in French). Paris: Les Presses ÉCLM.
- Gendron, Corinne (2007). Vous avez dit développement durable? [You said sustainable development?] (in French). Montréal: Les Presses internationales Polytechnique. p. 142. ISBN 9782553016233.
- Gendron, C.; Vaillancourt, J-G. (2007). Environnement et sciences sociales. Les défis de l'interdisciplinarité [Environment and Social Sciences. The Challenges of Interdisciplinarity] (in French). Québec: University of Laval Press. p. 444.
- Gendron, Corinne (2006). Le développement durable comme compromis. La modernisation écologique de l'économie à l'are de la mondialisation [Sustainable development as a compromise. The ecological modernization of the economy in the era of globalization] (in French). Québec: University of Québec Press. p. 284.
- Gendron, C.; Vaillancourt, J-G. Économie, Société et environnement [Economy, Society and Environment] (in French). Québec: University of Laval Press.
- Gendron, Corinne (2004). La gestion environnementale et ISO 14 001 [Environmental Management and ISO 14 001] (in French). University of Montreal Press. p. 347.
- Gendron, C.; Vaillancourt, J-G. (2003). Développement durable et participation publique. De la contestation écologiste aux défis de la gouvernance [Sustainable Development and Public Participation. From the environmental challenge to the challenges of governance] (in French). University of Montreal Press. p. 398.
