= List of English translations from medieval sources: A =

The list of English translations from medieval sources: A provides an overview of notable medieval documents—historical, scientific, ecclesiastical and literature—that have been translated into English. This includes the original author, translator(s) and the translated document. Translations are from Old and Middle English, Old French, Old Norse, Latin, Arabic, Greek, Persian, Syriac, Ethiopic, Coptic, Armenian, and Hebrew, and most works cited are generally available in the University of Michigan's HathiTrust digital library and OCLC's WorldCat. Anonymous works are presented by topic.

== List of English translations ==
=== AA–AD ===
Abbasid Caliphate. Abbasid Caliphate, the third Islamic caliphate, ruling from 750 to 1258.

- Byzantines and Arabs in the time of the early Abbasids (1900), by E. W. Brooks. In The English Historical Review, XV (1900), pp. 728–747, XVI (1901), pp. 84–92.
- The Life of Mahomet: from original sources (1877). Translated by Scottish orientalist Sir William Muir (1819–1905).
- Annals of the Early Caliphate: from original sources (1883). Translated by William Muir.
- The Eclipse of the ʻAbbasid caliphate: original chronicles of the fourth Islamic century (1920–1921). Edited, translated and elucidated by British orientalists Henry Frederick Amedroz (1854–1917) and David Samuel Margoliouth (1858–1940). Includes the Book of Viziers of Hilal al-Sabi', Tajárib al-Umam by Miskawayh and the Damascus Chronicles of ibn al-Qalanisi.
- Umayyads and 'Abbásids, being the fourth part of Jurjí Zaydán's History of Islamic civilization (1907). A translation by D. S. Margoliouth of Tarikh al-Tamaddun al-Islami, 5 volumes (1901–1906) of Lebanese writer Jurji Zaydan (1861–1914).

'Abd Allāh ibn Fadl Allah. Also known as Wassāf (fl. 1300), he was a Persian historian of the Ilkhanate.

- The allocation of cities and the propulsion of epochs (Tajziyat al-amṣār wa-tazjiyat al-a'ṣār) (1871). In The History of India, as Told by Its Own Historians, The Muhammadan Period, Volume III, pp. 24–54. From the posthumous papers of English historian Sir Henry Miers Elliot (1808–1853). Edited in part by Elliot and in part by a munshi, revised by him.

'Abd al-Kāhir ibn 'Abd al-Rahmān al-Jurjāni. Also known as Abd al-Qāhir al-Jurjānī (1009–1081). Surnamed al-Nuhwī (the grammarian), he was a renowned Persian grammarian.

- The Mi-ut ạmil, and Shurḥoo Miut ạmil (1814). Two elementary treatises on Arabic syntax Mi-ut ạmil (the Hundred Governing Powers) and Shurḥoo Miut. Translated from the original Arabic with annotations, philological and explanatory, in the form of a perpetual commentary. The rules exemplified by a series of stories and citations from various Arabian authors, with an appendix containing the original text. Edited by British orientalist Abraham Lockett (1781–1834).

'Abd al-Kāhir ibn Tāhir ibn Muhammad, Abū Mansūr, al-Baghdādī. Also known as Abu Mansur al-Baghdadi (died 1037), he was an Arab scholar, Imam, heresiologist and mathematician.

- Al-Farq bayn al-Firaq (Moslem schisms and sects) (1919). Edited by American orientalist Kate Chambers Seelye (1889–1973).
- Al-Farq bayn al-Firaq, Part 2 (1935). Updated by Israeli historian Abraham S. Harkin (1903–1990).

'Abd al-Latif. Also known as Abd al-Laṭīf al-Baghdādī (1162–1231), a physician, philosopher, historian, Arabic grammarian and traveler, one of the most voluminous writers of his time.

- Extract from the relation respecting Egypt of Abd Allatif.... (1814). In A General collection of the best and most interesting voyages and travels in all parts of the world, many of which are now first translated into English: digested on a new plan. Volume XV, pp. 802–839 (1814). Translated by Scottish antiquary John Pinkerton (1758–1826).
- Personal observations of a physician and man of letters. Translated from the French rendering of French orientalist Antoine Isaac Silvestre de Sacy (1758–1838).
- Account of Egypt (1800). Arabic document first discovered and published by English orientalist and Biblical scholar Edward Pococke (1604–1691). His son, Edward Pococke the Younger, then translated a fragment of the work into Latin. English Arabic scholar Thomas Hunt (1696–1774) began the task of completing the translation but did not finish. The Latin translation was then completed by English orientalist and theologian Joseph White (1745–1814).

'Abd al-Malik ibn Hishām. Also known as ibn Hisham (died 833), an Arabic biographer who edited the biography of Islamic Prophet Muhammad written by ibn Ishaq.

- The Hijrah: a chapter from ibn Hisham. In The Life of Muhammad: a Translation of Isḥāq's Sīrat rasūl Allāh(1997). Translated by British Islamic scholar Alfred Guillaume (1888–1965).

'Abd al-Masih ibn Ishāk, al-Kindi. Also known as al-Kindi (fl. 10th century), an Arab of whom very little is known.

- Apology of al-Kindi (1882). A partial translation into English of Apology of al-Kindi, written at the court of Abbasid caliph al Mâmûn (AD 830) in defense of Christianity against Islam. Translation by Scottish orientalist Sir William Muir (1819–1905).
- Al-Kindi's treatise on the cause of the blue colour of the sky (1937). Edited and translated by German orientalist Otto Spies (1901–1981). (cf. German Wikipedia, Otto Spies). In the Journal of the Bombay branch of the Asiatic Society, n.s. XIII (1937). pp. 7–19.

'Abd al-Rahmān ibn Abi Bakr, Jalāl al-Din, al-Suyūti. Also known as al-Suyuti (1445–1505), he was an Egyptian scholar, historian and jurist.

- History of the Caliphs (1881). An edition of History of the Caliphs translated by Major Henry Sullivan Jarrett (1839–1919).
- History of the Temple of Jerusalem (1836). Translated by the Rev. James Reynolds.
- The Mutawakkili of as-Suyuti (1926). Translated by William Yancy Bell.
- The Treatise on the Egyptian Pyramids (1939). Translated by Leon Nemoy (born 1901). In Isis, XXX.

'Abd al-Rahman ibn 'Ali ibn al-Jauzi. Also known as ibn al-Jawzi (1116–1201), he was an Arab historian, hagiographer, and philologist.

- Talbīs Iblīs (The Devil's Delusion). Translated by English orientalist David Samuel Margoliouth, in Islamic Culture, IX–XII (1935–1938).

'Abd al-Razzāk ibn Is'hāk, Kamāl al-Din al-Samarakandi. Also known as Abd-al-Razzāq Samarqandī (1413–1482), he was a Persian chronicler and Islamic scholar, serving as the ambassador of Shah Rukh, the Timurid ruler of Persia.

- Narrative of the Journey of Abd-er-Razzak, Ambassador from Shah Rukh, A.H. 845, A.D. 1442. In India in the Fifteenth Century (1857). Translated from Persian to French by French orientalist Étienne Marc Quatremère (1782–1857), and rendered into English with notes by English geographer and librarian Richard Henry Major (1818–1891).
- Matla'u-s sa'dain of 'Abdu-r Razzák (1872). In The History of India, as Told by its Own Historians, The Muhammadan Years, Volume IV, pp. 89–126. Translated by C. J. Oldfield. From the posthumous papers of English historian Henry Miers Elliot.

'Abd al-Wahhāb ibn 'Ali, Tāj al-Din, al-Subki. Also known as Taj al-Din al-Subki (1327–1370), he was an Egyptian historian and Islamic scholar.

- An unpublished XIVth century fatwā of the status of foreigner in Mamluk Egypt and Syria. Translated and edited by Egyptian Coptologist Aziz Suryal Atiya (1898–1988).

'Abdisho Hazzāya. Seventh century Syriac Christian writer who was brother to Joseph Hazzaya who may have written books in his brother's name.

- Mystical treatises by 'Abdisho Hazzāya. In Woodbrooke Studies: Christian Documents in Syriac, Arabic, and Garshūni (1927). Translated and edited by Iraqi historian Alphonse Mingana (1878–1937).

Abelard, Peter. Peter Abelard (1079–1142), also known as Pierre Abailard, was a medieval French scholastic philosopher, theologian, musician and logician.

- Abailard's Ethics (1935). Translated by J. Ramsay McCallum with a foreword by Anglican bishop Kenneth E. Kirk (1886–1954).
- Historia calamitatum: The story of my misfortunes (1922).
- Letters of Abelard and Eloisa: with a particular account of their lives, amours, and misfortunes (1824).

Abhari, Athir al-Din al-Mufaddal, al-. Also known as Athir al-Din al-Abhari (died c. 1264), he was a Persian philosopher, astronomer, astrologer and mathematician, who had many famous disciples.

- Isāghūjī fi al-Manṭiq. A treatise on logic, commentary on the Isagoge by Porphyry. Latin translation by Italian Franciscan friar Tomaso Obicini (1585–1632). English translation by Edwin Elliott Calverley (1882–1971) reprinted in the Macdonald Presentation Volume (1933), consisting of articles of former students of American orientalist Duncan Black Macdonald (1863–1943).

'Abdisho 'Bar Berikhā. Also known as Abdisho bar Berika (died 1318), he was a bishop and Syriac writer.

- Index of Biblical and Ecclesiastical Writings drawn up by Mar Abd Yeshua, metropolitan of Nisbis and Armenia, A.D. 1298. In The Nestorians and their Rituals (1852) by the Rev. George Percy Badger (1815–1888).
- The Paradise of Eden. Latin translation by Jibrāīl Kardāhī (1845-1931), English translation by Frederick Victor Winnett.

'Abid ibn al-Abras. A pre-Islamic Arab poet (fl. 6th century).

- The Dīwāns of ʻAbīd ibn al-Abraṣ, of Asad: and ʻĀmir ibn aṭ-Ṭufail, of ʻĀmir ibn Ṣaʻṣaʻah (1913). Translated and edited by English Arabic scholar Sir Charles James Lyall (1845–1920).

Abingdon Abbey. Abingdon Abbey is a Benedictine monastery now located in Oxfordshire, England.

- The Chronicle of the Monastery of Abingdon from A.D. 1218 to A.D. 1304 (1844). Now first published from the original m.s. in the public library at Cambridge. Edited by English antiquary James Orchard Halliwell (1820–1889).
- The Chronicle of Walter of Guisborough (14th century). The original version of the above, where additions were made at Abingdon. The work above only includes the additions. By English chronicler Walter of Hemingford.

Abraham. A Syriac priest of the 12th or 13th century who wrote of Rabban Hormizd, a 7th-century Persian monk, and Rabban Bar-Idta (fl. c. 600)

- The Histories of Rabban Hormizd the Persian and Rabban Bar-Idta (1902). Translated and edited by British Egyptologist and orientalist Sir Ernest Alfred Wallis Budge (1857–1934).

Abraham and Isaac. The old English miracle play of Abraham and Isaac. In Drama from the Middle Ages to the Early Twentieth Century: An Anthology of Plays with Old Spelling, edited by Christopher J. Wheatley.

Abraham bar Dāshandād. Abraham bar Dāshandād (fl. 730), an elder of the Church of the East. He was nicknamed "the Lame of Beth Ṣayyade" after the village in Adiabene where he was born. Abraham was the disciple of the reformer of ecclesiastical music Babai of Gbilta and later became teacher at the School of Bashosh in Persia. The patriarch Timothy I of Seleucia-Ctesiphon was a student of Abraham's.

- Mystical treatises of Abraham bar Dāshandād. In Woodbrooke Studies: Christian Documents in Syriac, Arabic, and Garshūni (1927). Translated and edited by Iraqi historian Alphonse Mingana (1878–1937).

Abraham ben Mē'ir ibn Ezra. Also known as Abraham ben Meir Ibn Ezra (c. 1092 – c. 1167), he was a distinguished Jewish biblical commentator and philosopher.

- Abraham Avenezra, of critical dayes, in Semeiotics Uranica (An Astrological Judgement of Diseases) (1651), by English physician Nicholas Culpeper (1616–1654).
- Abraham ibn Ezra's Commentary on the Canticles, after the first recension (1874). Translated by Henry John Matthews (born 1844).
- The Beginning of Wisdom: an astrological treatise by Abraham ibn Ezra (1939). Edited by Spanish historian Francisco Cantera Burgos (1901–1978) and Raphael Levy. In The Johns Hopkins Studies in Romance Literatures and Languages, Extra Volume, 14.
- The Commentary of Ibn Ezra on Isaiah, 4 volumes (1873–1877). Translated by English orientalist Michael Friedländer (1833–1910).
- Rabbi Ben Ezra and the Hindu-Arabic problem (1918). An account of Hindu mathematics as introduced into Islam. By David Eugene Smith and Jekuthial Ginsburg. In American Mathematical Monthly, XXV.

Abraham ben Moses ben Maimon. Also known as Abraham Maimonides (1186–1237), he succeeded his father Maimonides as Nagid of the Egyptian Jewish community.

- The high ways to perfection of Abraham Maimonides (1927). Edited by Samuel Rosenblatt (1902–1983).
- A comprehensive guide to the servants of God (1938). The second volume of the above.

Abraham ben Simeon. Abraham ben Simeon, of Worms (c. 1362 – c. 1458), a Jewish occultist who wrote the Book of Abramelin (complete title below).

- The book of the sacred magic of Abramelin the mage, as delivered by Abraham the Jew unto his son Lamech, A.D. 1458, 3 volumes (1898). By British occultist Samuel Liddell MacGregor Mathers (1854–1918).

Abū al-'Alā'. Also known as Abū al-ʿAlāʾ al-Maʿarrī (973–1058), he was a blind Arab philosopher and writer.

- The Quatrains of Abu'l-Ala (1903). Selected from his Lozum-ma-la-yalzam and Sact-uz-zind and now first rendered into English by Lebanese-American writer Ameen Fāris Rihani (1876–1940).
- The Diwan of Abuʾl-Ala (1929). Translated by Henry Baerlein (1875–1963), as part of the Wisdom of the East series.
- Abu'l Ala, the Syrian (1914). Translated by H. Baerlein.
- The Letters of Abu ľ-ʻAlā of Maʻarrat al-Nuʻmān (1898). Edition from the Leyden manuscript, with the life of the author. Translated and edited by English orientalist David Samuel Margoliouth. In Anecdota oxoniensia, Semitic series, 10.
- Abu ľ-ʻAlā of Maʻarrat al-Nuʻmān's correspondence on vegetarianism (1902). Translated and edited by D. S. Margoliouth. In Journal of the Royal Asiatic Society, 1902, Article XI, pp. 288–332.
- The Meditations of Ma'arri, in Studies in Islamic poetry (1921). By English orientalist Reynold Alleyne Nicholson (1868–1945).
- The deception of outward appearance; an Arabic poem written by Abu-'Iola of Moarra (1765). Translated into Latin by Dutch orientalist Jacobus Golius (1596–1667), with notes. Rendered into English with additional notes by English clergyman and orientalist Leonard Chappelow (1683–1768).
- The Risālatu'l-Ghufrān (Resalat Al-Ghufran), summarized and partially translated by R. A. Nicholson, In Journal of the Royal Asiatic Society, 1900, Article XXV, pp. 637–720, and 1902, Article V, pp. 75–101, Article XIII, pp. 337–362, and Article XXVI, pp. 713–847.

Abū Bakr ibn al-Tufail, Abū Ja'far, al-Ishbili. Also known as ibn Tufail (1110 –1185), an Arab polymath.

- An account of the oriental philosophy, shewing the wisdom of some renowned men of the East and particularly the wisdom of Hai Ibn Yokdan both in natural and divine thing which he attained with all converse with men (1764). Transcribed from Arabik to Latine and then English by English orientalist and Biblical scholar Edward Pococke (1604–1691).
- Risālat Hayy ibn Yakzān. Translation by George Keith. Portions reprinted in The Idea of Robinson Crusoe (1930) by Antonio Pastor.
- The History of Hai eb'n Yockdan, an Indian prince: or, The self-taught philosopher (1686). Translated by E. Pococke and into English by George Ashwell.
- The improvement of human reason, exhibited in the life of Hai ben Yokdhan; written in Arabik by Abu Jaafar ben Tophail (1708). Newly translated version of Ḥayy ibn Yaqẓān by British orientalist Simon Ockley (1678–1720). Revised in 1905 by Edward A. Van Dyck and in 1929 by A. S. Fulton.
- The awakening of the soul; a philosophical romance (1910). Rendered from the Arabic by Dr. Paul Brönnle (born 1867).

Abū Bakr Muhammad ibn Ibrāhim al-Kalābādhi. Also known as Abu Bakr al-Kalabadhi (died 990/994), he was a Persian Sufi scholar.

- The Doctrine of the Sufis (1935). An English translation of Kitab al-Ta'arruf li-maddhhab ahl al-tasawwuf by British orientalist Arthur John Arberry (1905–1969).

Abū al-Fath ibn Abi al-Hasan. Also known as Abu'l-Fath (fl. 1335), he was a 14th-century Samaritan chronicler.

- The Samaritan chronicle of Abu'l Fatah; the Arabic text from the manuscript in the Bodleian Library (1865). English translation by the Rev. Robert Payne Smith (1818–1895).

Abū al-Fidā'. Abū al-Fidā' (1273–1331) was a Kurdish geographer and historian.

- The Chevalier d'Arvieux's travels to Arabia the desert written by himself and published by Mr. de la Roque, to which is added a general description of Arabia by Sultan Ishmael Abulfeda (1719). By French traveler and diplomat Laurent d'Arvieux (1635–1702).
- The Life of Mohammed (1833). Translated with an introduction and appendix by William Miller. Extracted from Abū al-Fidā's Tarikh al-Mukhtasar fi Akhbar al-Bashar.

Abu Ja'far Ahmad ibn Muhammad al-Ghāfiqi. Abu Ja'far Ahmad ibn Muhammad al-Ghāfiq (died 1165), an Arab physician.

- The abridged version of "The book of simple drugs" of Ahmad ibn Muhammad al-Ghâfiqî (1932–1933). Translated by M. Meyerhof and G. P. Sobhy.

Abū al-Mawāhib, al-Shādhili. Abū al-Mawāhib, al-Shādhili (1417–1477), an Egyptian Sufi historian.

- Illumination in Islamic mysticism (1938). Translated by Edward Jabra Jurji (born 1907).

Abū al-Qāsim al-'Arif. Also known as ibn al-Arif (1088–1141), he was the founder of a Sufi tariqa based on the teachings of Muslim ascetic ibn Masarra (883–931).

- The heights of ambition by Abu'l-Qāsim al-'Arif (1937). Translated from the Arabic by British orientalist Arthur John Arberry (1905–1969), in Islamic Culture, XI.
- The "Quest for God"; an early Mohammedan treatise of mystical devotion. Translated by English orientalist Reynold Alleyne Nicholson (1868–1945), in The Quest, XIX (1927–1928), pp. 225–238.

Abū Sa'id Mansūr ibn al-Husain, al-Abayyi. Abū Sa'id Mansūr ibn al-Husain, al-Abayyi (died c. 899).

- The book of truthfulness (1937). Translation of Kitāb al-sidq by British orientalist Arthur John Arberry (1905–1969). In Islamic Research Association series 8.

Abū Sa'id ibn Abi al-Khair. Also known as Abū Saʿīd Abū'l-Khayr (967–1049), Sheikh Abusaeid or Abu Sa'eed, he was a Persian Sufi and poet.

- Some more quatrains of Abú Sa'íd bin Abi'l Khair (1916). In Journal of the Asiatic Society of Bengal, n.s. XII (1916), pp. 240–275 Edited and translated by Henry Duncan Graves Law (born 1883).

Abū Sa'id Mansūr ibn al-Husain, al-Abayyi. Abū Sa'id Mansūr ibn al-Husain, al-Abayyi (died 1030).

- Arabian with and wisdom from Abu Sa'id al-Abi's Kitab anther al-duwrar (1934). In Journal of the American Oriental Society, LIV (1934), pp. 230–275. Translated by Charles A. Owen (no further information).

Abū Sālih, al-Armani. Abu al-Makārim Saʿdullāh ibn Jirjis ibn Masʿūd (died 1208) was mistakenly referred to as Abū Ṣāliḥ the Armenian or Abū Ṣāliḥ, al-Armani.

- The churches and monasteries of Egypt and some neighboring countries, attributed to Abū Ṣāliḥ, the Armenian (1895). Edited and translated by Basil Thomas Alfred Evetts (born 1858), with added notes by Alfred Joshuah Butler (1850–1936). In Anecdota oxoniensia, Semite series 7.

Abū Tammām. 'Abū Tammām (ca. 796/807 - 850) was an Arab poet known in literature by his 9th-century compilation of early poems known as the Kitab al-Hamasah, one of the greatest anthologies of Arabic literature ever written. Hamasah contains 10 books of poems, with 884 poems in total.

- Specimens of pre-Islamitic Arabic poetry, selected and translated from the Hamasah (1881). By Hungarian orientalist Edward Rehatsek (1819–1891). In the Journal of the Bombay Branch of the Royal Asiatic Society, XV (1881–1882), pp. 65–108.
- The Díwán Hammásah: a selection of Arabic poems (1856). By Kabir al-Din Ahmad and Ghulam Rabbani.

Abū Yazid, al-Bistāmi. Commonly known in Persian circles as Bāyazīd Bisṭāmī (9th century), he was a Persian Sufi.

- An early Arabic version of the Mi'rāj of Abū Yazid, al-Bistāmi (1926). Translated by English orientalist Reynold Alleyne Nicholson (1868–1945). In Islamica II (1926), pp. 402–415.

Acacius. Acacius of Constantinople (died 489) was the Ecumenical Patriarch of Constantinople from 472 to 489. He was known for his correspondence with Peter III of Alexandria (Peter Mongus) concerning the Henotikon, a christological document issued by Byzantine emperor Zeno in 482 and the rescript of the emperor Anastasius I Dicorus.

- Anecdota monophysitarium (1905). The correspondence of Peter Mongus, patriarch of Alexandria, and Acacius, patriarch of Constantinople, together with the Henoticon of the Emperor Zeno and the rescript of the Emperor Anastasius. Translated by British orientalist Frederick Cornwallis Conybeare (1856–1924). In the American journal of theology IX (1905), pp. 719–740.

Acallamh na Senórach. Acallamh na Senórach, known as Colloquy of the Ancients, is a Middle Irish narrative dating to c. 1200. It is the most important text of the Fenian Cycle. It is reprinted in Silva gadelica, XII.

- Colloquy of the Ancients (1892). In Silva gadelica (I–XXXI), edited by Standish Hayes O'Grady (1832–1915). Chapter XII. Agallamh na senórach : lebar Még Charthaig.
- Acallamh na Senórach (1900). By Celtic scholar Whitley Stokes (1830–1909).
- Acallamh na senórach: Lays and ranns from the folk-lore of the Gael (1922). By Mary Grant O'Sheridan.

Adam and Eve. Works concerning the creation myth of Adam and Eve.

- Antichrist and Adam: two mediaeval religious dramas (1925). Translated by William Henry Hulme (1862–1934) and Sarah Field Barrow, with an introduction by Hulme.
- Adam: a religious play of the twelfth century (1928). Also known as Le Jeu d'Adam, the Repraesentatio Adae and Le mystère d'Adam and containing three parts, Adam and Eve, Cain and Abel, the Processus prophetarum. Translated from the Norman French and Latin into English verse by Edward Noble Stone (born 1870).
- The Book of Adam and Eve (1882). Also called the conflict of Adam and Eve with Satan, a book of the early Eastern Church. With notes from the Kufale (Jubilees), Talmud, Midrashim, and other Eastern works. Translated from the Ethiopic by British orientalist, the Rev. Solomon Caesar Malan (1812–1894).

Adam de la Halle. Adam de la Halle (1240–1287), also known as Adam the Hunchback, was a French trouvère, poet and musician.

- The play of Robin and Marion (1937). A translation of Le Jeu de Robin et de Marion, a mediaeval folk comedy-opera in one act, written for the court of Robert I, Count of Artois, in the thirteenth century. Reconstructed and harmonized in the manner of the period by Jean Beck. The text is in the original Old French with an English translation by John Murray Gibbon (1875–1952), the songs being in modern French.

Adam of Saint Victor. Adam of Saint Victor (died 1146) was a French poet and composer of Latin hymns and sequences.

- The liturgical poetry of Adam of St. Victor (1881). From the text of French literary historian Léon Gautier (1832–1897), with translation into English in the original meters by Digby Strangeways Wrangham (died 1892).
- Sequences (2013). Translated with an introduction, text, and notes by Juliet Mousseau, with a foreword by Hugh Feiss. In Dallas Medieval Texts and Translations, 18.

Adam of Usk. Adam of Usk (c. 1352 – 1430) was a Welsh priest, canonist, and medieval historian and chronicler.

- Chronicon Adæ de Usk: A. D. 1377–1404 (1876). Edited with a translation and notes by British palaeographer Sir Edward Maunde Thompson (1840–1929).
- Chronicon Adæ de Usk: A. D. 1377–1421 (1904). A continuation of Ibid to 1421.

Adamnan. Adamnán of Iona, or Adomnán (c. 624 – 704), was an abbot of Iona Abbey, hagiographer, statesman, canon jurist, and saint. He was the initiator of the Cáin Adomnáin (Law of Adomnán), also known as the Lex Innocentium (Law of Innocents), promulgated at the Synod of Birr in 697. See also the discussion in Early Sources of Scottish History, A.D. 500 to 1286, Volume I, pp. xxi–xxii.

- The life of the glorious abbot S. Columbe, abridged out of Latin written by S. Adamanus (1625).
- The life of Saint Columba: founder of Hy (1874). Edited by Irish antiquary William Reeves (1815–1892). In Historians of Scotland, VI (1874).
- Life of Saint Columba, or Columbkille (1861). Translated by the Right Rev. Daniel MacCarthy (1822–1881).
- Adamnani Vita S. Columbae: Prophecies, miracles and visions of St. Columba (Columcille): ninth abbot of Iona, A.D. 563-597 (1895). A new translation by Joseph Thomas Fowler (1833–1924).
- The life of Saint Columba (Columb-Kille) A.D. 521-597 (1905). Founder of the monastery of Iona and first Christian missionary to the pagan tribes of North Britain. Newly translated from the Latin by Wentworth Huyshe (1837–1934).
- Cáin Adamnáin: an Old-Irish treatise on the law of Adamnan (1905). Edited and translated by German Celtic scholar Kuno Meyer (1858–1919).
- The pilgrimage of Arculfus in the Holy Land: about the year A.D. 670 (1889). Written by Adamnan from Arculfus' oral statement. Translated by the Rev. James Rose Macpherson. In the library of the Palestine Pilgrims' Text Society, Volume III, Part 1. Includes the abbreviation of the account by Bede. An abridged version can be found in Early Travels in Palestine (1848) by English antiquary Thomas Wright (1810–1877).

Adamnan, Saint. Works related to a legendary Irish saint, possibly Adamnán of Iona.

- The Vision of Adamnán is a work of visionary literature written in Middle Irish in two parts, the first dating to the 11th century and the second the early 10th century.
- The life of Adamnan (1908–1909). Translated from the Betha Adamnáin, printed in Anecdota from Irish mss. Translated by Maud Joynt (died 1940). In Celtic Review V (1908–1909).
- An Irish precursor of Dante: a study on the Vision of heaven and hell ascribed to the eighth-century Irish Saint Adamnán (1908). Translated by Charles Stuart Boswell.

Addai the Apostle. Addai is also known as Thaddeus of Edessa, one of the seventy disciples of Jesus, possibly fictitious.

- The doctrine of Addai, the Apostle (1876). A translation of the Doctrine of Addai, now first edited in a complete form in the original Syriac, with an English translation and notes, by English orientalist George Phillips (1804–1892). A partial translation was provided by English orientalist William Cureton (1808–1864) in his Ancient Syriac Documents (1864).

Adelard of Bath. Adelard of Bath (c. 1080 – c. 1152) was a 12th-century English natural philosopher, known both for his original works and for his translations. He was one of the first to introduce the Arabic numeral system to Europe.

- Adelard of Bath (1913). By American medieval historian Charles Homer Haskins (1870–1937). In The English Historical Review, XXVI (1913), pp. 491–498.
- Dodi ve-nechdi (1920). Literally, Uncle and nephew. The work of Jewish philosopher Berachiah ben Natronai (fl. 12th or 13th century), to which is added the first English translation from the Latin of Adelard of Bath's Quaestiones naturales, by British Hebrew scholar Hermann Gollancz (1852–1930).

=== AE–AL ===
Aegidius of Assisi. Blessed Aegidius (Giles) of Assisi (c. 1190 – 1262) was one of the original companions of Saint Francis of Assisi.

- The golden sayings of the Blessed Brother Giles of Assisi (1907). Newly translated and edited together with a sketch of his life by Irish ecclesiastical diplomat the Rev. Fr. Paschal Robinson (1870–1948).
- Blessed Giles of Assisi (1918). By Walter Warren Seton (1882–1927). In British Society of Franciscan Studies 7.

Ælfric. Ælfric of Eynsham (c. 955 – c. 1010) was an English abbot and a writer of hagiography, homilies and Biblical commentaries, sometimes called the Grammarian.

- An Anglo-Saxon abbot, Ælfric of Eynsham (1912). By Samuel Harvey Gem.
- Ælfric's life of Æthelwold (1912), in An Anglo-Saxon abbot, Ælfric of Eynsham, pp. 166–180. By S. H. Gem.
- A colloquy, for exercising boys in speaking Latin, first compiled by and added to by Aelfric Bata, his disciple (1912), in An Anglo-Saxon abbot, Ælfric of Eynsham, pp. 183–195. By S. H. Gem.
- The canons of Ælfric (1840). Edited and translated by English scholar of Anglo-Saxon literature Benjamin Thorpe (1782–1870). In Ancient laws and institutes of England and Monumenta ecclesiastica anglicana(1840), pp. 441–451. The canons are also found in A collection of the laws and canons of the Church of England (1720), by English clergyman John Johnson (1662–1725).
- Ælfric's pastoral epistle and Ælfri's epistle entitled Quando divides Chrisma (1840). Pastoral epistles for Wulfstan (died 1023), Archbishop of York. Translated by B. Thorpe. In Monumenta ecclesiastica anglicana (1840), pp. 452–463 and 464–465.
- Concerning the Old and New Testament (1623). A Saxon Treatise concerning the Old and New Testament, written about the time of King Edgar (700 yeares agoe) by Ælfricus Abbas, thought to be the same that was afterward Archbishop of Canterbury, whereby appeares what was the canon of Holy Scripture here then received, and that the Church of England had it so long agoe in her mother-tongue. by English antiquary William L'Isle(1569–1637).
- De temporibus. In Leechdoms, wortcunning, and starcraft of early England, Volume 3, pp. 232–285 (1864–1866). Being a collection of documents, for the most part never before printed, illustrating the history of science in this country before the Norman conquest. By English philologist the Rev. Thomas Oswald Cockayne (1807–1873). In Rerum Britannicarum Medii Ævi Scriptores 35 (Rolls Series).
- The Anglo-Saxon version of the Hexameron of St. Basil (1849). Or, Be Godes six daga weorcum. And the Anglo-Saxon remains of St. Basil's Admonitio ad filium spiritualem. By Henry Wilkins Norman (1822–1849).
- Exameron Anglica, or The Old English version of the Heptateuch: Aelfric's Treatise on the Old and New Testament and his Preface to Genesis (1922). By Samuel John Crawford (1884–1931). Published for Early English Text Society, Original series, 130.
- Homilies of Ælfric: a supplementary collection (1967). By American scholar of Old English John Collins Pope (1904–1997). Published for Early English Text Society, Original series 130.
- The homilies of the Anglo-Saxon church (1844–1846). The first part, containing the Sermones catholici, or Homilies of Ælfric. In the original Anglo-Saxon with an English version translated by Benjamin Thorpe (1782–1870). Printed for the Ælfric Society.
- Aelfric's Lives of saints (1881–1900). Being a set of sermons of saints' days formerly observed by the English church. From manuscript Julius E. VII in the Cottonian collection, with readings from other manuscripts, by British philologist Rev. Walter William Skeat (1835–1912). Published for the Early English Text Society, Original series, Volumes 76, 82, 94, 114.
- An Anglo-Saxon passion of St. George (1850). From a manuscript in the Cambridge University Library. Edited with a translation by English antiquary the Rev. Charles Hardwick (1817–1889).
- An English-Saxon homily on the birthday of St. Gregory (1709). Anciently used in the English-Saxon church. Giving an account of the conversion of the English from paganism to Christianity. Translated into modern English with notes by English Anglo-Saxon scholar Elizabeth Elstob (1683–1756).

Aelred of Rievaulx. Known as Ælred (1110–1167), who served as abbot of Rievaulx.

- Lives of S. Ninian and S. Kentigern (1874). Compiled in the twelfth century. Edited by bishop Alexander Penrose Forbes (1817–1875). In Historians of Scotland, V (1871).
- Life of Ninian by Ailred of Rievaulx (1904), by W. M. Metcalfe. An edition of Ælred's Vita Sancti Ninani.

Aflāki, Shams al-Din Ahmad. Known as Shams ud-Din Ahmad Aflāki (died 1360), he was a Persian writer who wrote Manāqib ul-Ārifīn between 1318 and 1353. The work is a hagiographical account of Jalāl ad-Dīn Muhammad Rūmī (1207–1273), better known simply as Rūmi, a Persian poet and mystic.

- Les saints des derviches tourneurs (1918–1922). A translation of Manāqib ul-Ārifīn into French by Clément Huart (1854–1926).
- The Mesnevi¯ (usually known as the Mesnevi¯yi Shefi¯f, or holy Mesnevi¯) of Mevla¯na¯ (our Lord) Jela¯u-'d-Di¯n, Muhammed, er-Ru¯mi¯: book the first, together with some account of the life and acts of the author, of his ancestors, and of his descendants. Illustrated by a selection of characteristic anecdotes, as collected by their historian Mevla¯na¯ Shemsu-'d-Di¯n Ahmed, El Efla¯ki¯, El'A¯rifi¯. Translated and the poetry versified by British Ottoman scholar Sir James William Redhouse (1811–1892). In Trübner's oriental series, 1881.
- Selected anecdotes from the work entitled "The acts of the adept" or Manāqib ul-Ārifīn (1881). Short title of The Mesnevi¯.

Africanus, Sextus Julius. Sextus Julius Africanus (c. 160 – c. 240) was a Christian traveler and historian noted for his influence on Eusebius. Known as the father of Christian chronography.

- The extant writings of Julius Africanus (1886). Translated by Scottish educator Stewart Dingwall Fordyce Salmond (1838–1905). In the Ante-Nicene Christian library, Volume VI–Fathers of the Third Century (cf. works related to Ante-Nicene Fathers at Wikisource).

Agapetus Diaconus. Agapetus (6th century) was a deacon of the church of Hagia Sophia and was a reputed tutor of Justinian. He was author of a series of exhortations in seventy-two short chapters addressed around 527 to Justinian, published in Patrologia Graecae, Volume 86a.

- The preceptes teachyng a prynce or a noble estate his duetie (1530). Written by Agapetus in Greek to the emperour Justinian, and after translated into Latin, and nowe in to Englysshe by Thomas Paynell (fl. 1528–1567).

Agrippa von Nettesheim. Heinrich Cornelius Agrippa von Nettesheim (1486–1535) was a German polymath, theologian, and occult writer.

- Three books of occult philosophy or magic (1898). A translation of Three Books of Occult Philosophy, edited by Willis F. Whitehead. Book one, Natural magic: which includes the early life of Agrippa, his seventy-four chapters on natural magic, new notes, illustrations, index, and other original and selected matter. By direction of the Brotherhood of magic: The magic mirror, a message to mystics, containing full instructions on its make and use.

Ahimaaz ben Paltiel. Ahimaaz ben Paltiel (1017–1060) was a Graeco-Italian liturgical poet. Best known for his Chronicle (1054) which provides important information of the history of the early Jewish settlements in Italy.

- The chronicle of Ahimaaz (1924). Translated with notes and an introduction by Marcus Salzman. In Columbia University oriental studies (1902), Volume 18.

Ahmad ibn Abi Ya'kub ibn Wādih. Known as al-Ya'kūbi (died c. 897), he was a geographer and historian associated with the Abbasid Caliphate.

- Al-Ya'Qubi's chapter about Jesus Christ (1933). Translated from the Ta'rikh ibn Wadih, edited by Martijn Theodoor Houtsma (1851–1943). English translation by Dwight M. Donaldson. Reprinted in the Macdonald Presentation Volume (1933), pp. 87–106, consisting of articles of former students of American orientalist Duncan Black Macdonald (1863–1943).

Ahmad ibn 'Ali. Called ibn Waḥshiyyah (died c. 930), he was a Nabataean Iraqi agriculturalist, toxicologist, and alchemist.

- Ancient alphabets and hieroglyphic characters explained (1806). With an account of the Egyptian priests, their classes, initiation, and sacrifices. Translated by Austrian orientalist Joseph Freiherr von Hammer-Purgstall (1774–1856).

Ahmad ibn Husain, Badi' al-Zamān, al-Hamadāni. Known as al-Hamadhāni (969–1007), he was a medieval Arab scholar.

- The Maqámát of Badí' al-Zamán al-Hamadhání (1915). Translated from the Arabic, with an introduction and notes, historical and grammatical, by William Joseph Prendergast.

Ahmad ibn Yahyā, al-Balāduri. Known as al-Balādhurī (820–892), he was an Arab historian.

- The Origins of the Islamic State (1916). A translation of Kitab Futuh al-Buldan (Book of the Conquests of Lands) by Phillip Khûri Hitti (1886–1978).
- The Origins of the Islamic State, Volume 2 (1968–1969). Translated by Francis Clark Murgotten (1880–1960).

Ailbe of Emly. Saint Ailbe of Emly (died early 6th-century) is also known as St Elvis and was a principal saint of Ireland.

- The rule of Ailbe of Emly (1907). Translated by Joseph O'Neill. In Ériu, Volume 3 (1907), pp. 92–115.
- The rule of St. Ailbhe (1871–1872). In Notes on the Life of St. Brendon, Irish Ecclesiastical Record, new series VIII, pp. 178–190 (1871–1872).

Airbertach mac Coisse. Known as Airbertach mac Cosse (died 1016), he was an Irish poet, lector and superior of the monastery of Ros Ailithir.

- On the geography of Roe Ailithir (1879). Edited and translated by the Rev. Thomas Olden (1823–1900). In the Proceedings of the Royal Irish Academy, polite literature and antiquities, 2nd ser. II (1879–1888), pp. 229–252.
- A poem by Airbertach mac Cosse (1966). Edited by Irish academic Gearóid Mac Eoin (born 1929). In Ériu, Volume 20 (1966), pp. 112–139.

Airdena Bratha. Known as Airdena inna cóic lá n-déc ria m-Bráth, the medieval text discusses the fifteen signs or tokens which are to precede the Day of Judgment, believed to be from the writings of St. Jerome and may be found in the Prognosticon Futuri Seculi of Julianus Pomerius.

- The fifteen tokens of Doomsday (1907). Edited and translated by Celtic scholar Whitley Stokes (1830–1909). In Revue celtique, XXVIII (1907), pp. 308–326.

Aislinge Meic Conglinne. The work known as Aislinge Meic Con Glinne (The vision of Mac Conglinne) is an anonymous Middle Irish tale believed to have been written c. 1200.

- Mac Conglinny's vision, a humorous satire. Translated from the original Irish in the Leabhar brec, a manuscript transcribed about the year 1400, by Irish scholar William Maunsell Hennessy 1829–1889). In Fraser's magazine, new series, VIII (1873), pp. 298–323.
- The vision of Mac Conglinny, a Middle-Irish wonder tale (1892). Edited with a translation (based on W. M. Hennessy's), notes and a glossary by German Celtic scholar Kuno Meyer (1858–1919) with an introduction by Wilhelm Wollner.

Alanus de Insulis. Known as Alain de Lille (c. 1128 – 1204), he was a French theologian and poet.

- Antielaudien: a thirteenth-century French adaptation of the Antielaudianus of Alain de Lille (1944). Translated by Andrew Joseph Creighton.
- The complaint of nature (1908). Translated from the Latin by Douglas Maxwell Moffat.

Alberti, Leone Battista. Leon Battista Alberti (1404–1472) was an Italian author, artist and architect.

- The architecture of Leon Battista Alberti in ten books (1726). Of painting in three books, and of statuary in one book. Translated into Italian by Cosimo Bartoli (1503–1572) and now into English by Giacomo Leoni (1686–1746).
- Hecatonphilia, the Arte of Loue (1598). Or Loue discouered in an hundred seuerall kindes. Printed at London by P.S. for William Leake.
- Of statues (1664). In A parallel of the antient architecture with the modern: in a collection of ten principal authors who have written upon the five orders. Written in French by Roland Fréart, sieur de Chambray (1606–1676), made English for the benefit of builders by John Evelyn (1620–1706).

Albertus Magnus. Albertus Magnus (c. 1200 – 1280), also known as Blessed Albert the Great, was a German Dominican friar and bishop of Ratisbon (1260–1262).

- The booke of secretes ... of the vertues of herbes, stones and certayne beastes (1560). Also a booke of the same author of the marvaylous thinges of the world, and of certayn effectes caused of certayne beastes.
- The book of secrets of Albertus Magnus of the virtues of herbs, stones and certain beasts (1617). Also, A book of the marvels of the world.
- De adhaerendo Deo. There are at least two translations: (1) Of cleaving to God (1954), translated by Elisabeth Stopp (1911–1966). (2) A treatise of adhering to God (1654), edited by Sir Kenelm Digby (1603–1665). See also the next entry.
- The treatise of Albertus Magnus: de adhaerendo Deo = of adhering to God (1850). Translated from the Latin.
- On union with God, by Blessed Albert the Great (1911). With notes by the Rev. P. J. Berthier, translated by a Benedictine of Princethorpe priory. See also the next entry.
- The Paradise of the soule (1617). A treatise of virtues, written in Latin by the venerable and learned man Albertus, surnamed the Great, whereunto is adioyned another treatise of the same author, Of the union with God, both translated into English by a father of the Society of Jesus.

Albirūni. Al-Biruni, or Abu Rayhan al Biruni, (973 – after 1050) was a Persian scholar and polymath.

- Alberuni's India (1910). An account of the religion, philosophy, literature, geography, chronology, astronomy, customs, laws and astrology of India about A.D. 1030. An English edition with notes and indices by German orientalist Edward C. Sachau (1845–1930).
- The chronology of ancient nations (1879). An English version of the Arabic text of the Athâr-ul-Bâkiya of Albîrûnî (Vestiges of the past) with notes and indices by E. Sachau. Published for the Oriental Translation Fund of Great Britain & Ireland.
- The book of instruction in the elements of the art of astrology (1934). Translated by Scottish zoologist Robert Ramsey Wright (1852–1933).

Albo, Joseph. Joseph Albo (1380–1444) was a Jewish philosopher and rabbi.

- Sefer ha-Ikkarim (Book of principles) (1929). A critical edition based on manuscripts and old editions, and provided with a translation and notes by Jewish historian Isaac Husik (1876–1939). In the Schiff library of Jewish classics.

Alchemy. Alchemy is an ancient branch of natural philosophy.

- His Exposition of the Hieroglyphicall Figures which he caused to bee painted upon an Arch in St. Innocents Church-yard, in Paris (1624). A transcription of Livre des figures hiéroglyphiques written by French scribe and alchemist Nicholas Flamel (1330–1418).
- The mirror of alchimy, composed by the thrice-famous and learned fryer, Roger Bachon (1597). An edition of The Mirror of Alchimy (Speculum Alchemiae) by English philosopher Roger Bacon (c. 1219 – c. 1292). Translation by Tenney L. Davis.
- The works of Bernard of Trevisano (see below).

Alcherius, Johannes. Giovanni Jehan (Johannes Alcherius) (fl.1382–1411) was an Italian art historian.

- Experimenta de coloribus and Experimenta diversa alia aqua de coloribus (1849). Original treatises, dating from the 12th to 18th centuries, on the arts of painting. Translated by Mary Philadelphia Merrifield (1804–1889).

Alcuin. Alcuin of York (c. 735 – 804), also called Ealhwine, Alhwin, or Alchoin, was an English scholar, clergyman, poet, and teacher.

- The life of Willibrord (1923). Translated by the Rev. Alexander Grieve. A biography of missionary saint Willibrord (c. 658 – 739), written by Alcuin and dedicated to the Abbot of Echternach. Alcuin also made use of a now-lost version written by an English monk. Bede also makes mention of Willibrord.
- The rhetoric of Alcuin and Charlemagne (1941). A translation, with an introduction, the Latin text, and notes by Wilbur Samuel Howell (born 1904).

Aldhelm. Aldhelm (c. 639 – 709) was bishop of Sherborne, and a writer and scholar of Latin poetry. Aldhelm is one of twelve Anglo-Saxon poets identified in mediaeval sources.

- The riddles of Aldhelm (1925). Translated by James Hall Pitman (born 1896). In Yale Studies in English, Volume 67.

Alexander, Saint. Alexander of Alexandria (died 326 or 328) was patriarch of Alexandria from 313 through 326, during the First Ecumenical Council.

- Epistles on the Arian heresy of the Manichaeans (1869). Translated by the Rev. James B. H. Hawkins. In the Ante-Nicene Christian library, Volume VI–Fathers of the Third Century (cf. works related to Ante-Nicene Fathers at Wikisource).

Alexander of Lycopolis. Alexander of Lycopolis (4th century) was reputed to be bishop of Lycopolis.

- The writings of Methodius, Alexander of Lycopolis, Peter of Alexandria, and several fragments (1869).
- The treatise of Alexander on the Manichaeans (1869). Translated by J. B. H. Hawkins. In the Ante-Nicene Christian library, Volume VI–Fathers of the Third Century (cf. works related to Ante-Nicene Fathers at Wikisource).

Alexander the Great. Alexander the Great (356 BC – 323 BC) was king of Macedon.

- The history of Alexander the Great, being the Syriac version of the Pseudo-Callisthenes (1889). Translated and edited from five manuscripts by British Egyptologist and orientalist Sir Ernest Alfred Wallis Budge (1857–1934).
- Alexander the Great: an account of his life and exploits from Ethiopic sources and other writing (1896). Translated and edited from manuscripts in the British Museum and the Bibliothèque nationale, Paris by E. A. W. Budge.
- History of Alexander the Great from the Leabhar breac (1884). Edited and translated by Charles Geisler. In Irisleabhar na Gaedhilge: Gaelic journal, II, pp. 247–passim.
- An old Hebrew romance of Alexander (1897). Translated and edited by British scholar and linguist Moses Gaster (1856–1939). In Journal of the Royal Asiatic Society, 1897, Article XIX, pp. 485–549.
- The legend of Alexander the Great: the nativity and conquests of Alexander (1928). In Medieval narrative: a book of translations (1928), pp. 281–331, by American medievalist Margaret Schlauch (1898–1986).
- Alexander the Great. In A manual of the writings in Middle English,1050–1400 (1923–1927), Chapter I.5, pp. 98–105. By John Edwin Wells (1875–1943).

Alexius, Saint. Saint Alexius, or Alexius of Rome, was a fourth-century monk.

- The Life of St. Alexius (1878). Edited by English philologist Frederick James Furnivall (1825–1910).

Alfonso, Pedro. Petrus Alphonsi (Pedro Alfonso, Peter Alphonse) (1062–1110) was a Jewish physician, writer, astronomer, and polemicist.

- Disciplina Clericalis (1919). English translation from the fifteenth century Worcester Cathedral Manuscript F. 172 by William Henry Hulme (1862–1934). In Western Reserve University Bulletin, new series Volume XXII. No. 3. May, 1919.

Alfred the Great. Alfred the Great (848/849 – 899) was ruler of England from c. 866–899.

- The whole works of King Alfred the Great (1858). With preliminary essays, illustrative of the history, arts, and manners, of the ninth century.
- King Alfred's books (1920). By the Right Rev. Bishop George Forrest Browne (1833–1930).
- The will of King Alfred (1828). Reprinted from the Oxford edition of 1788, with a preface and additional notes.
- The will of Ælfred, king of West Saxons (1944). By Adwin Wigfall Green.
- King Alfred's Old English version of St. Augustine's Soliloquies (1904). Turned into modern English by Henry Lee Hargrove.
- The Old English version of Bede's Ecclesiastical history of the English people (1890–1898). A version of Ecclesiastical history of the English people by Bede, edited with a translation and introduction by Thomas Miller. Published for Early English Text Society, Original series, 95, 96, 110, 111.
- King Alfred's Anglo-Saxon version of Boethius' De consolatione philosophiæ (1829). With an English translation and notes by J. S. Cardale. A version of De consolatione philosophiæ (The Consolidation of Philosophy), the best known work of Boethius (c. 477 – 524). Another edition (1895), translated by the Rev. Samuel Fox (1801–1870).
- King Alfred's Anglo-Saxon version of the Metres of Boethius (1835). With English translation and notes by S. Fox.
- A metrical version of King Alfred's poems, to illustrate Anglo-Saxon poetry in general (1858). in The whole works of King Alfred the Great, Volume 1, pp. 157–248.
- King Alfred's West-Saxon version of Gregory's Pastoral care (1871–1872). Translated from the Latin text, notes and an introduction, edited by English philologist Henry Sweet (1845–1912). The work Liber Regulae Pastoralis (Pastoral care) written c. 590 by pope Gregory I. Published for Early English Text Society, Original series, 45, 50.
- The Anglo-Saxon version from the historian Orosius by Ælfred the Great (1773). Together with a translation from the Anglo-Saxon by English antiquary Daines Barrington (1727/1728–1800). A translation of Old English Orosius, an adaption from the Latin Historiae adversus paganos by Paulus Orosius (fl. 400), produced by an anonymous writer, possibly encouraged or inspired by Alfred. Another edition (1859), edited by English scholar the Rev. Joseph Bosworth (1788–1876).
- The life of Alfred the Great (1857). To which is appended King Alfred's Anglo-Saxon version of the History of Paulus Orosius. Translated from the German by historian Reinhold Pauli (1823–1882).
- Alfred in the chroniclers (1900). Edited and translated by John William Edward Conybeare (born 1843).
- The life and times of Alfred the Great (1848). By English historian John Allen Giles (1808–1884). Includes a number of translations, including: Alfred's Will; Alfred's Proverbs; Fulk's Letter to Alfred; Alfred's Preface to Gregory's Pastoral Care; and Chronological Summary of Anglo-Saxon History.
- The works of John Asser (died c. 909), bishop of Sherborne, author of the biography Life of King Alfred. See below.

Ali ('Ali ibn Abi Tālib). Ali ibn Abi Talib, known as Ali, (601–661) was a cousin and son-in-law of Muhammad, who ruled as the fourth caliph from 656 until his assassination in 661.

- Sentences of Ali, son-in-law of Mahomet and his fourth successor (1717). Translated from an authentick Arabick manuscript in the Bodleian Library at Oxford, by British orientalist Simon Ockley (1678–1720). Reprinted in the History of the Saracens (1718) by S. Ockley.
- The proverbs of Ali bin Talebi (1884). Translated by K. T. Best. In Indian antiquary, XIII, XIV (1884, 1885)
- Ibn Hajr the Ascalonite; or, the Choicest Aphorisms of the Prophet of God, Muhammad ... and his pious companions and followers (1897). Translated by J. W. Rockwell and revised and compared with the original Arabic text by Munshi Mahbub Alam (1865–1933). A translation of the Munabbihāt 'ala al-isti'dād.
- Sad Kalima, or Centiloquium of 'Alî b. Abî Ṭâlib (1926–1928). With the metrical paraphrase of Rashîd-i Waṭwâṭ, edited and translated by A. H. Harley. In Muslim review I (1926–1928), pp. 53–61.
- Maxims of 'Ali (1937). Translated by John Alexander Chapman (1875–1957).

'Ali ibn 'Abbas al-Majūsi. 'Ali ibn al-'Abbas al-Majusi (died between 982 and 994) was a Persian physician and psychologist.

- The anatomy of the brain in the works of Galen and 'Ali 'Abbas; a comparative historical-anatomy study (1914). By Jules Wiberg. In Janus XIX (1914), pp. 17–32, 84–104.

'Ali ibn Abi Bakr, Burhān al-Din, al-Marghināni. Burhan al-Din al-Marghinani (died 1197) was an Islamic scholar of the Hanafi school of jurisprudence.

- The Hedaya or Guide: a commentary on the Mussulman laws (1791). By Charles Hamilton (1752–1782). A translation of al-Hidayah (the Guidance), a 12th-century legal document.

'Ali ibn Ahmad. 'Ali ibn Ahmad, called Ibn Hazm, (994–1064) was an Andalusian Muslim polymath and historian.

- A book containing the Risāla known as The dove's neck-ring, about love and lovers by ʻAlī ibn Aḥmad Ibn Ḥazm al-Andalusi, may God forgive him and pardon him, and the believers (1914). Translated by Dmitriĭ Konstantinovich Pétrof (1872–1925). An earlier edition of The Ring of the Dove (1951), translated by British orientalist Arthur John Arberry (1905–1969).
- The heterodoxies of the Shiites according to Ibn Ḥazm (1909). Translated by Biblical scholar Israel Friedlaender (1876–1920). In the Journal of the American Oriental Society, XXVIII (1907), pp. 1–80, XXIX (1909), pp. 1–183.

'Ali ibn Hamza al-Basri. 'Ali ibn Hamza al-Basri (10th century) was an Arab writer.

- Critical Observations on the Mistakes of Philologers (1904). Part V: Observations on the Mistakes in the Book called Ikhtiyār Fasih al-Kalām, composed by Abu'l-'Abbās Ahmad ibn Yahya Tha'lab (815 –904). Translated from a manuscript in the British Museum by Richard Bell (1876–1952). In the Journal of the Royal Asiatic Society, LVI (1904), pp. 95–118.

'Ali ibn Hasan, al-Khazraji. 'Ali ibn Hasan, al-Khazraji (died 1409) was a member of the Yemeni sultan al-Ashraf Isma'il's court.

- The Pearl-strings: a history of the Resúliyy dynasty of Yemen (1906). With translation, introduction, annotations, index, tables and maps by Sir James William Redhouse (1811–1892). Edited by Edward Granville Browne (1862–1926), Reynold Alleyne Nicholson (1868–1945) and A. Rogers. A history of the Rasulid dynasty of Yemen from al-Mansur Umar in 1229 through the death of al-Ashraf Isma'il in 1400. In the E. J. W. Gibb memorial series, Volume 3.

'Ali ibn Husain, al-Mas'ūdi. 'Ali ibn Husain, al-Mas'ūdi, called al-Mas'udi (c. 896 – 956) was an Arab historian, geographer and traveler, referred to as the "Herodotus of the Arabs."

- El-Mas'udi's historical encyclopedia entitled "Meadows of gold and mines of gems" (1841). Translation of Meadows of Gold and Mines of Gems from the Arabic by Austrian orientalist Aloys Sprenger (1813–1893).
- Tales of the caliphs (1909). Translated by Claud Field (1863–1941).
- An account of the establishment of the Fatemite dynasty in Africa (1840). Being the annals of that province from the year 290 of the heg'ra to the year 300, extracted from an ancient Arabic ms. ascribed to El Mas'ûdi, belonging to the ducal library of Saxe-Gotha. Translated by John Nicholson (1809–1886). Once attributed to al-Mas'udi, not believed to be written by ʻArīb ibn Saʻd, al-K̀urt̀ubī.

'Ali ibn 'Isā, al-Kahhal. Alī ibn ʿĪsā al-Kahhal (fl. 1010) was an Arab ophthalmologist, known in medieval Europe as Jesu Occulist.

- Memorandum book of a tenth-century oculist (1936). A translation of the Tadhkirat of Ali ibn Isa of Baghdad (c. 940–1010 A.D.), the most complete, practical, and original of all the early textbooks on the eye and its diseases. The first edition in English by Canadian ophthalmologist Casey Albert Wood (1856–1942).

'Ali ibn Ismā'il, Abū al-Hasan al-Ash'ari. Known as al-Ashʿarī (c. 874 – 936), he was an Arab scholastic theologian and founder of Ashʿarism, an important theological school in Sunni Islam.

- The elucidation of Islam's foundation (1940). A translation of Al-Ibânah 'an Usûl ad-Diyânah with an introduction and notes by bishop Walter Conrad Klein (1904–1980). In American oriental series, 19.

'Ali ibn Rabban Tabari. Abu al-Hasan Ali ibn Sahl Rabban al-Tabari (9th century) was a Persian scholar and physician who produced one of the first encyclopedias of medicine entitled Firdous al-Hikmah (Paradise of wisdom).

- The book of religion and empire: a semi-official defence and exposition of Islam written by order at the court and with the assistance of the Caliph Mutawakkil (A.D. 847–861) (1922). Translated with a critical apparatus, from an apparently unique manuscript in the John Rylands Library, by Alphonse Mingana (1881–1937).

'Ali ibn Ridwān. Abu'l Hassan Ali ibn Ridwan al-Misri (c. 988 – c. 1061) was an Egyptian physician, astrologer and astronomer.

- Climate and health in old Cairo (1928). Translated by Max Meyerhof (1847–1945). Extracted from On the Prevention of Bodily Ills in Egypt.

'Ali ibn 'Uthmān al-Jullābi al-Hujwiri. Known as Ali Hujwiri (c. 1009 – 1072/1077), he was a Persian mystic, theologian, and preacher.

- Kashf al-maḥjūb (Unveiling of the Hidden) (1911). The oldest Persian treatise on Sufism, translated by English orientalist Reynold Alleyne Nicholson (1868–1945) with a foreword by Shahidullah Faridi (1915–1978). Reprinted in E. J. W. Gibb memorial series, 17

Alnwick Abbey. Alnwick Abbey was a Premonstratensian monastery founded in 1147.

- Cronica Monasterii de Alnewyke et quodam Libro Cronicorum (1844). Translated by William Dickson (1799–1875). In Archaeologia aeliana, or, Miscellaneous tracts relating to antiquities, 1st ser. III (1844), Chapter VI, pp. 33–45. Chapters VII and VIII are also works about the abbey by W. Dickson.

=== AM–AO ===
Amadis de Gaula. Amadís de Gaula is a Portuguese chivalric romance which was written at the onset of the 14th century.

- Amadis de Gaul, a poem in three books (1803). Translated into French by Nicolas de Herberay des Essarts (died c. 1557), and subsequently into English by British poet William Stewart Rose (1775–1843).
- Amadís de Gaul (1803). Translated by English poet Robert Southey (1774–1843), based on the Spanish version by Castilian author Garci Rodríguez de Montalvo (c. 1450 – 1505). Attributed to Vasco de Lobeira (died 1403).
- A knight errant and his doughty deeds; the story of Amadis of Gaul (1911). Translated by writer of juvenile works Norman J. Davidson.

Ambroise. Ambroise of Normandy (fl. 1190) was a Norman poet and chronicler who wrote of the Third Crusade in his Old French poems.

- The history of the Holy War (1939). A translation of L'estoire de la guerre sainte, being an account of the Third Crusade composed in verse by Ambroise, a jongleur in the service of Richard Lion-Heart. Three Old French chronicles of the crusades, rendered into English by Edward Noble Stone (born 1870). In University of Washington, Publications in the social sciences, (1939), pp. 1–160.
- The crusade of Richard Lion-Heart (1941). Translated from the Old French by Merton Jerome Hubert, with notes and documentation by American historian John L. La Monte (1902–1949).

Ambrosius. Saint Ambrose, born Aurelius Ambrosius (c. 340 – 397), was the bishop of Milan and an influential ecclesiastical figure of the 4th century.

- Select works and letters of St. Ambrose (1896). Translated by the Rev. H. De Romestin and the Rev. Henry Thomas Forbes Duckworth (1868–1927). In the Select library of Nicene and post-Nicene fathers of the Christian church, Second series, Volume X (1896).
- Bibliography of works by St. Ambrose.

America, Norse discovery of. Sagas associated with the Norse discovery and colonization of North America, including Grænlendinga Þáttr and Eiríks saga rauða.

- The discovery of America by the Northmen, in the tenth century: with notices of the early settlements of the Irish in the Western Hemisphere (1841). By Irish military writer and antiquary North Ludlow Beamish (1797–1872). Includes Grænlendinga Þáttr; chapters 6–15 of Eiríks saga rauða; and brief selections from other Icelandic sources. Reprinted in: Beamish's Voyages of the Northmen to America (1877), edited by the Rev Edmund Farwell Slafter; and The Norse discovery of America (1906), edited by James William Buel (1849–1920).
- The pre-Columbian discovery of America by the Northmen, illustrated by translations from the Icelandic sagas (1868). Edited with notes and a general introduction by American clergyman and historian Benjamin Franklin De Costa (1831–1904).
- Eirik the Red's saga (1880). Translated by the Rev. John Sefton (Sephton) (born 1835). In the Proceedings of the Literary and Philosophical Society of Liverpool (1879–1880), Volume 34, XXXIV, pp. 183–212.
- The finding of Wineland the good: the history of the Icelandic discovery of America (1895). Edited and translated from the earliest records by Arthur Middleton Reeves (1856–1891), to which is added a biography and correspondence of the author by William Dudley Foulke (1848–1935). Includes Grænlendinga Þáttr, Eiríks saga rauða and other brief notices from Icelandic annals. Reprinted in: The Norse discovery of America (1906); The Northmen, Columbus, and Cabot, 985–1503 (1906), edited by Julius E. Olson (Volume 19 of Original narratives of early American history); and Leif Eriksson, discoverer of America A.D. 1003 (1930), by Edward F. Gray (born 1871).
- Origines islandicae: a collection of the more important sagas and other native writings relating to the settlement and early history of Iceland (1905). Edited and translated by Icelandic scholar Guðbrandur Vigfússon (1827–1889) and English historian Frederick York Powell (1850–1904).
- The Flatey Book and recently discovered Vatican manuscripts concerning America as early as the tenth century (1906). Edited by American author Rasmus Björn Anderson (1846–1936).
- The Norse discoverers of America: the Wineland sagas (1921). Translated and discussed by British soldier and Norse historian Geoffrey Malcolm Gathorne-Hardy (1878–1972).
- Voyages to Vinland: the first American saga (1942). Translated and interpreted by American linguist Einar Ingvald Haugen (1906–1994).
- Bibliography of the Icelandic sagas and minor tales (1908). By Halldór Hermansson (1878–1958). In Islandica, Volume 1 (1908). (cf. Icelandic Wikipedia, Halldór Hermansson)
- The voyages of the Venetian brothers, Nicolò & Antonio Zeno, to the Northern seas in the XIVth century (1873). Comprising the latest known accounts of the lost colony of Greenland; and of the North men in America before Columbus. An account of the voyage of the Zeno brothers, edited, with notes and an introduction, by British geographer and map librarian Richard Henry Major (1818–1891). Issued by the Hakluyt Society, First series, Volume 50, pp. 39–54.

'Amir ibn al-Tufail. ʿĀmir ibn al-Ṭufayl (6th century) was a chieftain of the Banu 'Amir and a poet.

- The Dīwāns of 'Abīd ibn al-Abraṣ of Asad and 'Āmir ibn aṭ-Ṭufail of 'Āmir ibn Ṣa'ṣa'ah (1913). Edited by English Arabic scholar Charles James Lyall (1845–1920). In E. J. W. Gibb memorial series, Volume 21.

Amis et Amiles. Amis et Amiles is an Old French romance based on a legend of friendship and sacrifice.

- Of the friendship of Amis and Amile (1894). Translated out of ancient French by British translator William Morris (1834–1896).
- The friendship of Amis and Amile (1910). In Aucassin & Nicolette and other mediaeval romances and legends., pp. 173–194. By Eugene Mason.

'Ammār ibn 'Ali al-Mawsili. Ammar al-Mawsili (Abu al-Qasim Ammar ibn Ali al-Mawsili) (11th century) was an Arab ophthalmologist.

- The cataract operations of ʾAmmâr ibn ʾAlî al-Mawsilî (1937). Translated by Max Meyerhof (1847–1945).

Ammianus Marcellinus. Ammianus Marcellinus (c. 330 – c. 391) was a Roman soldier and historian.

- The Romane historie (1609). Edited by English translator Philemon Holland (1552–1637).
- The Roman history of Ammianus Marcellinus: during the reigns of the emperors Constantius, Julian, Jovianus, Valentinian, and Valens (1894). Translated by English historian Charles Duke Yonge (1812–1891).
- Ammianus Marcellinus. With an English translation by American classical scholar John Carew Rolfe (1859–1943). In Leob classical library (1935–1939).

Amphilochius. Amphilochius (c. 339 – c. 400) was bishop of Iconium and a lawyer and theologian.

- S. Amphilochius of Iconium on John 14, 28 (1930). Syriac text with translation by C. Moss. In Le muséon, XLIII (1930).

Amra Choluimb Chille. The Amra Coluim Chille was an ancient Irish elegy to Gaelic monk Columbkille written in 575 by Dallán Forgaill (c. 560 – 640), the Chief Ollam of Ireland.

- The Amra Choluim Chilli of Dallan Forgaill (1871). Printed for the first time from the original Irish in Lebor na hUidre, a manuscript in the library of the Royal Irish Academy; with a literal translation and notes, a grammatical analysis of the text, and copious indexes, by John O'Beirne Crowe.
- The Irish Liber hymnorum (1898). Volumes I and II. Edited from the manuscripts and translated by Irish philologist Robert Atkinson (1839–1908) and Irish clergyman John Henry Bernard (1860–1927).
- The Bodleian Amra Choluim Chille (1899). Edited and translated by Celtic scholar Whitley Stokes (1830–1909). In Revue celtique, XX (1899), pp. 30–passim.
- The Amra Choluim Chille, or Eulogy of St. Columbkille (1917). Translated by Thomas J. Shaw. In Irish Ecclesiastical Record, 5th series IX (1917), pp. 118–129.

Amundesham, Johannes. John (Johannes) Amundesham (fl. 1421–1440) was author of annals of St. Albans Abbey under the direction of the abbot John Whethamstede (died 1465).

- Annales Monasterii S. Albani (1870–1871). Known as the Annals of Amundesham, it was edited by English translator, lexicographer and antiquary Henry Thomas Riley (1816–1878).
- An account of the altars, monuments, and tombs existing A.D. 1428 in Saint Alban's abbey (1873). With a ground plan by John Chapple. A translation of three Latin documents comprised in Volume 1 of Amundesham's Annals of Amundesham. Translated from the original Latin with notes by Ridgway Lloyd.

Ananias of Shirak. Anania Shirakatsi (Ananias of Shirak) (c. 610 – c. 685) was an Armenian polymath and natural philosopher.

- Ananias of Shirak (A.D. 600—650 c.). Translated by English translator Frederick Cornwallis Conybeare. In Byzantinische Zeitschrift, VI (1897), pp. 572–584.
- Ananias of Shirak upon Christmas (1896). Translated by F. C. Conybeare. In The expositor, 5th series IV (1896). pp. 321–337.

Anatolius of Alexandria. Anatolius of Alexandria (fl. 270) was bishop of Laodicea beginning in 268.

- The Paschal Canon of Anatolius of Alexandria; fragments of the book on arithmetic (1896). Translated by Scottish educator Stewart Dingwall Fordyce Salmond (1838–1905). In the Ante-Nicene Christian library, Volume VI–Fathers of the Third Century (cf. works related to Ante-Nicene Fathers at Wikisource).

Anatomical texts. The study of medieval anatomy includes the work done at the Schola Medica Salernitana beginning in the 9th century and the texts of Saracen physician Constantine the African (died c. 1099) and Persian physician Alī ibn'Abbās al-Majusi (10th century).

- Anatomical texts of the earlier Middle Ages (1927). A study in the transmission of culture, with a revised Latin text of Anatomia Cophonis and translations of four texts. Includes: The First Salernitan Anatomical Demonstration (Anatomia Cophonis, Anatomia parva Galeni); The Second Salernitan Anatomical Demonstration; Anatomia Mauri; Systematic Descriptive Anatomies (Anatomia Ricard and Anatomia Magistri Nicolai); and Anatomia Vivorum (Anatomia Ricardi Anglici). Translated by George Washington Corner (1889–1981).
- Four Armenian tracts on the structure of the human body (1921). Authorship of the tracts is uncertain. The fourth tract has been incorrectly attributed to bishop Gregory of Nyssa (c. 335 – c. 395). Translated by English translator Frederick Cornwallis Conybeare. In Studies in the history and method of science (1917–1921) Volume II, pp. 359–384. Edited by Charles Joseph Singer (1876–1960).

Ancen riwle. Ancrene Riwle or Ancrene Wisse (Guide for Anchoresses) is an anonymous monastic manual for anchoresses, written in the early 13th century.

- The Ancren Riwle: a Treatise on the Rules and Duties of Monastic Life (1853). Edited and translated from a semi-Saxon manuscript of the 13th century by James Morton (1783–1865).
- The English Text of the Ancrene Riwle: Ancrene Wisse, ms. CCCC 402 (1962). Edited by J. R. R. Tolkien (1892–1973) and Neil Ripley Ker (1908–1982). Published for Early English Text Society, Original series, 249.

Andalusi, Abū al-Kāsim ibn Sa'id ibn Ahmad. Known as Ṣāʿid al-Andalusī (1029–1070), he was an Arab qadi in Muslim Spain, who wrote on the history of science, philosophy, and astronomy, and compiled a biographic encyclopedia of science.

- An eleventh century source for the history of Jewish scientists in Mohammedan land (Ibn Ṣa'id) (1927). An extract from Ṭabaqāt al-ʼUmam (Categories of nations). Translated by Joshua Finkel. In the Jewish Quarterly Review, vol. 18, no. 1, 1927, pp. 45–54.
- Science in the medieval world: book of the Categories of nations (1991). Translated by Alok Kumar (born 1954) and Semaʻan I. Salem (born 1927).

Andreas. Andreas is an Old English poem which tells the story of St. Andrew the Apostle. It is one of the poems appearing in the Vercelli Book. A prose edition is included in the Blickling Homilies.

- The Anglo-Saxon legends of St. Andrew and St. Veronica (1851). Edited for the Cambridge Antiquarian Society, with an English translation by English Egyptologist and Bible scholar Charles Wycliffe Goodwin (1817–1878).
- The Blickling homilies of the tenth century (1874). From the Marquis of Lothian's unique manuscript A.D. 971. Includes a prose version of the poem, pp. 228–249. Edited by the Rev. Richard Morris (1833–1894). In the Early English Text Society, Original series, 58, 63, 73.
- Andreas, or, The legend of St. Andrew (1899). An Old English poem attributed to Cynewulf. Translated by Robert Kilburn Root (1877–1950). In Yale Studies in English, Volume 7.

Andreas, Bernard. Bernard André (1450–1522), known as Andreas, was a French Augustinian friar and poet, who was a chronicler of the reign of Henry VII of England.

- Historia regis Henrici Septimi: a Bernardo Andrea tholosate conscripta, necnon alia quædam ad eundem regem spectantia (1858). Edited by British historian James Gairdner (1828–1912).
- Les douse triumphs de Henry VII (The twelve triumphs of Henry VII) (1858). A poem of uncertain authorship, attributed to B. Andreas. In Historia regis Henrici Septimi, reprinted in Rerum Britannicarum medii ævi scriptores: or, Chronicles and memorials of Great Britain and Ireland during the Middle Ages, Volume 10.

Andreas Capellanus. Andreas Capellanus (fl. 1170), known as Andrew the Chaplain, was a French author of De amore (The Art of Courtly Love).

- The art of courtly love, by Andreas Capallanus (1941). With an introduction, translation and notes by John Jay Parry (1889–1954).

Aneirin. Aneirin or Aneurin (early 7th century) was a medieval Celtic poet, whose principal work was the Welsh poem Y Gododdin of elegies to the men of the Brittonic kingdom of Gododdin who participated in the Battle of Catraeth (c. 600).

- Mythology and rites of the British Druids ascertained by national documents (1809). [The Gododin, pp. 326–383.] An account compared with the general traditions and customs of heathenism, as illustrated by antiquaries of our age. With an appendix, containing ancient poems and extracts, with some remarks on ancient British coins. By Welsh writer Edward Davies (1756–1831).
- The Gododin, and the odes of the months (1820). Translated from the Welsh by William Probert (1790–1870).
- Y Gododin: a poem on the battle of Cattraeth by Aneurin, a Welsh bard of the sixth century (1852). With an English translation and numerous historical and critical annotations by the Rev. John Williams ab Ithel (1811–1862).
- The four ancient books of Wales containing the Cymric poems attributed to the bards of the sixth century, 2 volumes (1868). The four books are: The Black Book of Carmarthen; the Book of Aneurin; the Book of Taliesin; and the Red Book of Hergest. The Welsh text is contained in Volume 2; the English translation in Volume 1. By Scottish historian and antiquary William Forbes Skene (1809–1892).
- Facsimile [and] text of the Book of Aneirin (1908–1922). By Welsh palaeographic expert and literary translator the Rev. John Gwenogvryn Evans (1852–1930).
- The book of Aneirin, with facsimiles (1911). By Celtic scholar Sir Edward Anwyl (1866–1914). In Transactions of the Honourable Society of Cymmrodorion, Session 1909–1910.
- Catraeth and Hirlas Owain: a study with critical texts (1921). Translated with notes by Welsh scholar T. Gwynn Jones (1871–1949). In Y Cymmrodor, XXXII (1921), pp. 1–57. Note: the Hirlas Owain, or the drinking-horn of Owain, is a poem attributed to Owain ap Gruffydd (c. 1130 – 1197) and is used in the literature as a comparison with the Gododin.

Angela of Foligno. Saint Angela of Foligno (1248–1309) was an Italian Franciscan who wrote about mystical revelations, earning her the moniker Mistress of Theologians.

- The book of the visions and instructions of blessed Angela of Foligno: as taken down from her own lips by Brother Arnold, of the Friars Minor (1871). Translated into English from the original Latin by A. P. J. Cruikshank.
- The book of divine consolation of the blessed Angela of Foligno (1908 or 1909). Translated from the Italian by Mary G. Steegmann and with an introduction by Algar Labouchere Thorold (1866–1936). In New medieval library, Volume 5.
- An essay in aid of the better appreciation of Catholic mysticism: illustrated from the writings of Blessed Angela of Foligno (1900). By A. L. Thorold.
- The spiritual armour of St. Catherine of Bologna together with the Way of the Cross by Blessed Angela of Foligno (1926). Translated by Alan Gordon McDougall (1895–1964) from the Italian work La via della crose (1919), edited by Guido Battelli.

Anglo-Saxon Chronicle The Anglo-Saxon Chronicle is a collection of annals in Old English chronicling the history of the Anglo-Saxons, originally created in the 9th century during the reign of Alfred the Great. The original was distributed to monasteries across England, where they were independently updated.

- A literal translation of the Saxon Chronicle (1819). Translated by English scholar and philanthropist Anna Gurney (1795–1857), with narrative extending to 1154.
- The Saxon chronicle (1823). With an English translation, and notes, critical and explanatory, by English academic the Rev. James Ingram (1774–1850). To which are added chronological, topographical, and glossarial indices; and a short grammar of the Anglo-Saxon language.
- The Venerable Bede's Ecclesiastical history of England: also the Anglo-Saxon chronicle (1847). With illustrative notes, a map of Anglo-Saxon England, and a general index. Edited by English historian John Allen Giles (1808–1884), et al..
- The Anglo-Saxon chronicle (1912). From the Monumenta Historica Britannica by English antiquary Henry Petrie (1768–1842).
- Anglo-Saxon chronicle (1853). In The Church historians of England (1853–1858), Volume II, Part 1, pp. 1–168, translated from the originals by English archivist Joseph Stevenson (1806–1895).
- The Anglo-Saxon chronicle, according to the several original authorities (1861). Edited with a translation by English scholar Benjamin Thorpe (1782–1870).
- The Anglo-Saxon chronicle (1909). Newly translated by E. E. C. Gomme.

Annals of Boyle. The Annals of Boyle, also known as the Cottonian Annals, are a chronicle of medieval Ireland, spanning the years up to 1253.

- The annals in Cotton MS Titus A XXV (1924). Transcribed by Alexander Martin Freeman. In Revue celtique, 41 (1924).
- The history of Ireland (1845). From the earliest period to the year 1245, when the Annals of Boyle, which are adopted and embodied as the running text authority, terminate: with a brief essay on the native annalists, and other sources for illustrating Ireland, and full statistical and historical notices of the barony of Boyle. By Irish historian John D'Alton (1792–1867).

Annals of Chester. The Annals of Chester, also known as the Annales cestrienses or Chronicle of the abbey of St. Werburg at Chester, are the work of anonymous monks of the Benedictine Abbey of St. Werburgh in Chester, and are a chronicle from the Incarnation to 1297.

- Annales cestrienses (1887). Edited with an introduction, translation and notes by English bibliophile Richard Copley Christie (1830–1901).

Annals of Clonmacnoise. The Annals of Clonmacnoise are an early 17th-century English translation of a lost Irish chronicle, covering events in Ireland through 1408. The work is also known as Mageoghagan's Book, after its translator Conall Mag Eochagáin.

- The Annals of Clonmacnoise (1896). Being annals of Ireland from the earliest period to A.D. 1408. Translated into English A.D. 1627 by Conell Mageoghagan and now for the first time printed. Edited by the Rev. Denis Murphy (1833–1896). In the Journal of the Royal Society of Antiquaries of Ireland, Extra volume from 1893 to 1895.

Annals of Fontenelle. The Annals of Fontenelle are a concise set of monastic annals composed by the community of St Wandrille, covering the 840s and 850s.

- Annales Fontanellenses (2022). Translated by Christian Cooijmans. Apardjón Journal for Scandinavian Studies. Special Volume II.

Annals of Fulda. The Annals of Fulda (Annales Fuldenses) are chronicles of the Franks that cover from the last years of Louis the Pious (died 840) to the end of Carolingian rule with the accession of Louis the Child in 900.

- Annals of Fulda (1992). Translated by Timothy Alan Reuter (1947–2002).

Annals of Inisfallen. The Annals of Inisfallen are a chronicle of the medieval history of Ireland covering the years between 433 and 1450.

- Extracts from the Annals of Innisfallen (1908). Translator unknown, in Kerry archaeological magazine, I–IV (1908–1918).

Annals of Ireland. Various annals of Ireland including the Annals of Leinster and the Fragmentary Annals of Ireland. See also the Annals of the Four Masters below.

- The tripartite life of Patrick: with other documents relating to that Saint (1887). [XVIII. Extracts from the Annals of Leinster, Volume II, pp. 512–529.] By Celtic scholar Whitley Stokes (1830–1909).
- St. Patrick Apostle of Ireland: a memoir of his life and mission (1864). [Translation of the Book of Leinster, pp. 179–183.] By Irish historian James Henthorn Todd (1805–1869).
- Britain (1610). [The annals of Ireland, pp. 150–210.] A chorographicall description of the most flourishing Kingdomes, England, Scotland, and Ireland, and the Ilands adioyning, out of the depth of Antiquitie: Beautified with Mappes of the several shires of England. Edited by English translator Philemon Holland (1552–1637).
- The annals of Ireland from the year 1443–1468 (1846). Translated from the Irish by Duald Mac Firbis (fl. 1643–1671) for Sir James Ware (1594–1666). Edited by Irish language scholar John O'Donovan (1806–1861). In The miscellany of the Irish Archaeological Society, (1846), Volume 1, pp. 198–302.
- Annals of Ireland: three fragments (1860). Copied from ancient sources by Duald Mac Firbis, and edited, with a translation and notes, from a manuscript preserved in the Burgundian Library at Brussels, by J. O'Donovan.
- Annales Hiberniae (1842). By James Grace, Kilkenniensis. Translated by the Rev. Richard Butler 1794–1862). Published by the Irish Archaeological Society.
- Chronicum Scotorum (1886). A translation of Chronicum Scotorum, a chronicle of Irish Affairs, from the earliest times to A.D. 1135, with a supplement containing the events from 1141 to 1150. Translated and edited by Irish scholar William Maunsell Hennessy (1829–1889). Rolls Series, 46.

Annals of Loch Cé. The Annals of Loch Cé cover events in Connacht and its neighbouring regions from 1014 to 1590.

- The annals of Loch Cé: a chronicle of Irish affairs from A.D. 1014 to A.D. 1590 (1871). Edited with a translation by Irish scholar William Maunsell Hennessy (1829–1889). Rolls Series, 54.

Annals of Scotland. The Annals of Scotland, or Annales regni Scotiae, is partly in Latin and partly in Old French, and is in the work by William Rishanger (c. 1250 – c. 1312). The material deals with the dispute concerning the succession to the Scottish throne, 1291–1292 (cf. Guardian of Scotland)

- Willelmi Rishanger, quondam monachi S. Albani, et quorundam anonymorum, Chronica et Annales, regnantibus Henrico Tertio et Edwardo Primo (1865), pp. 233–368. Edited by English translator Henry Thomas Riley (1816–1878). Rolls Series, 28, Part 2.

Annals of Saint Neots. The Annals of Saint Neots is a Latin chronicle compiled and written at Bury St Edmunds between c. 1120 and c. 1140, covering the history of Britain from the invasion by Julius Caesar to the making of Normandy in 914.

- Asser's Life of King Alfred: together with the Annals of Saint Neots erroneously ascribed to Asser (1904). Translation by English archivist Joseph Stevenson (1806–1895).

Annals of the Four Masters. The Annals of the Four Masters, also known as the Annals of (the Kingdom of) Ireland or Annála Ríoghachta Éireann, are chronicles of medieval Irish history. The entries span from the Deluge, dated at 2242 years after creation to 1616. The four masters were the principal author Mícheál Ó Cléirigh (Michael O'Clery) (c. 1590 – 1643), and Cú Choigcríche Ó Cléirigh (fl. 1624–1664), Fearfeasa Ó Maol Chonaire (fl. 1630s) and Cú Choigríche Ó Duibhgeannáin (fl. 1627–1636).

- The annals of Ireland (1846). Translated from the original Irish of the four masters by Irish scholar Owen Connellan (1797–1871) with annotations by Philip MacDermott, and the translator.
- Annals of the kingdom of Ireland, by the Four masters, from the earliest period to the year 1616 (1856). Edited and translated by Irish language scholar John O'Donovan (1809–1861).

Annals of Tigernach. The Annals of Tigernach are chronicles probably originating in Clonmacnoise, most importantly for the periods 489–766, 973–1003 and 1018–1178. The coverage of the period 766–973 is lost, but may appear in Chronicon Scottorum. Attributed to Tigernach Ua Braín (died 1088), abbot of Clonmacnoise. The continuation to 1178 by an anonymous author. See the discussion in Early Sources of Scottish History, A.D. 500 to 1286, Volume I, pp. xcv–xcvi, 162–164.

- Annals of Tigernach (c. 1897). Edited and translated by Celtic scholar Whitley Stokes (1830–1909). In Revue celtique, Volumes XVI, pp. 374–419; XVII, pp. 6, 119, 337, passim; XVIII, 9, 150, 267, passim.

Annals of Ulster. The Annals of Ulster are annals of medieval Ireland spanning the years from 431 to 1540.

- Annals of Ulster: otherwise, ... Annals of Senat (1887–1901). A chronicle of Irish affairs from A. D. 431, to A. D. 1540. Published by the authority of the Lords commissioners of Her Majesty's Treasury, under the direction of the council of the Royal Irish Academy. Compiled by Irish historian Cathal Óg Mac Maghnusa (1439–1498) and continued by Rory O'Cassidy (died 1541). Edited by Irish scholars William Maunsell Hennessy (1829–1889) and Bartholomew MacCarthy (1843–1904).

Anonimalle Chronicle. The Anonimalle Chronicle is a chronicle in Anglo-Norman by an anonymous monk of the Abbey of St Mary going from the legendary Brutus of Troy to 1381.

- The great revolt of 1381 (1906). [The Anonimalle chronicle of St. Mary's York. pp. 186–205.] By British military historian Sir Charles William Chadwick Oman (1860–1946).

Anonymous Pilgrims. The accounts of anonymous pilgrims I–VIII to Jerusalem in the 11th and 12th centuries.

- Anonymous pilgrims I–VIII (11th and 12th centuries) (1894). Translated by English historian Aubrey Stewart (1844–1916). In the library of Palestine Pilgrims' Text Society (PPTS), Volume VI, Part 1.
- Anonymous pilgrim accounts known as Innominatus VII (1145) and Innominatus VIII (1185). In Descriptiones Terrae Sanctae ex saeculo VIII., IX., XII. et XV (1874), by Swiss oriental scholar Titus Tobler (1806–1877).

Ansāri, Abū Ismā'il 'Abd Allāh ibn Muhammad. al-. Known as Abu Ismaïl Abdullah al-Herawi al-Ansari or Abdullah Ansari of Herat (1006–1088), he was a Muslim Sufi saint and poet.

- The Persian mystics: The invocations of Sheikh 'Abdullāh Ansāri of Herat, A.D. 1005–1090 (1939). Includes The invocations of Abdullāh Ansāri; The knower and the known; and Words of warning. Translated by Sandar Sir Jogendra Singh.
- The Afghans honor a Muslim saint: an international conference celebrates the 900th anniversary of the death of Khwaja Abdullah Ansari Herawi (1963). By American archaeologist Louis Dupree (1925–1989).

Anselm. Saint Anselm of Canterbury (1033/1034–1109) was an Italian Benedictine monk and theologian who was archbishop of Canterbury from 1093 to 1109.

- Pious breathings: being the meditations of St. Augustine, his treatise of the love of God, soliloquies and manual (1701). To which are added, select contemplations from St. Anselm and St. Bernard. Made English by George Stanhope (1660–1728), dean of Canterbury and a Royal Chaplain. Includes: St. Anselm's Meditations concerning the redemption of mankind; Of the misery of man; and Incentive to holy love at pp. 289–353.
- Proslogium; Monologium; an appendix, In behalf of the fool by Gaunilon and Cur Deus homo (1903). An edition of Anselm's works Proslogium, Monologium and Cur Deus Homo? and the work In Behalf of the Fool by Gaunilon. Translated by Sidney Norton Deane (1878–1943)
- Translations from Anselm and Proofs of the Existence of God (1851). By the Rev. John Sharp Maginnis (1805–1852). In Biblioteca sacra, VIII, pp. 529–553,699–715 (1851).
- Meditations and prayers to the Holy Trinity and our Lord Jesus Christ, by S. Anselm (1856).
- Cur deus homo of St. Anselm, to which is added a selection from his letters (1889).
- The devotions of Saint Anselm, Archbishop of Canterbury (1903). Includes Proslogium, selections from the meditations and prayers, and five letters. Edited by English theologian and philosopher Clement Charles Julian Webb (1865–1954).
- Cur Deus homo =: Why God became man, by St. Anselm (1858). Translated, with an introduction containing some account of the author, and an analysis of the work, by a clergyman.
- Cur Deus homo?: Why God became man? (1886). By S. Anselm, archbishop of Canterbury. Translated with an introduction, analysis and notes by Edward Stallybrass Prout. Published by the Religious tract society.
- The Mount of Olives: or, Solitary devotions (1652). With an excellent discourse of the blessed state of man in glory, written by the most reverend and holy Father Anselm Arch-Bishop of Canterbury, and now done into English. By Welsh poet and translator Henry Vaughan (1621–1695), silurist.
- The hymn of St. Casimir (1886). Attributed to St. Anselm and translated by the Very Rev. Prior James Ambrose Dominic Aylward (1813–1872). In The Month, LVI-LVII, Part 1, pp. 54–61.

Antar. Antarah ibn Shaddad al-Absi, known as Antar (525–608), was a pre-Islamic Arab knight and poet. His chief poem forms part of the Mu'allaqāt, said to have been suspended in the Kaaba.

- Antar: a Bedoueen romance (1820). Translated by English orientalist and translator Terrick Hamilton (1781–1876). Also known as the Romance of Antar.

Antichristus and Adam. Two medieval plays. Antichristus was a play written in Latin probably c. 1160, appearing in a collection by Richard Froning. Adam (Le mystère d'Adam) was written in Old French (Anglo-Norman) sometime in the 12th century.

- Antichrist and Adam: two mediaeval religious dramas (1925). Translated into English by Sarah Field Barrow and William Henry Hulme (1862–1934). With an introduction by W. Hulme.
- Das Drama des Mittelalters (1891–1892). By Richard Froning (born 1859).
- A historical and bibliographical survey of the German rellgious drama (1924). By Maximilian Josef Rudwin.
- Le mystère d'Adam: an Anglo-Norman drama of the twelfth century (1918). Translated by Paul Studer (1879–1927).

Antoninus of Placentia. The anonymous pilgrim of Piacenza (6th century) has been erroneously called Antonius of Placentia. He was a Christian pilgrim from Piacenza who travelled to the Holy Land in the 570s and wrote a narrative of his pilgrimage.

- The pilgrimage of Antoninus of Placentia, A.D. 570 (1866). Translated by Benjamin Harris Cowper. In the Journal of sacred literature, Volume VIII (1866).
- The Holy Places Visited by Anoninus Martyr, A.D. 560–570 (1896). Translated by English historian and translator Aubrey Stewart (1844–1916) and annotated by Sir Charles William Wilson (1836–1905). In the library of Palestine Pilgrims' Text Society (PPTS), Volume II, Part 4.

Antonio di Padova. Saint Antonio di Padova or Anthony of Padua (1195–1231) was a Franciscan priest and friar.

- Devotion to St. Anthony of Padua: the novena of nine Tuesdays and prayers in his honor (1908). Translated by Bonadventure Hammer (1842–1917).
- The little flowers of Saint Anthony of Padua: from a fifteenth-century vernacular version in the Liber Miraculorum (1936). Edited by Luigi Guidaldi.Translated by George Duncan Smith (born 1893).
- The moral concordances of St. Anthony of Padua (1856). Translated by English Anglican scholar John Mason Neale (1818–1866).

Anwari. Anwari (1126–1189), full name Awhad ad-Din 'Ali ibn Mohammad Khavarani, was a Persian poet at the court of the Seljuk dynasty.

- Two kasídahs of the Persian poet Anwari (1872). Translated by Edward Bayles Cowell (1826–1903). and Edward Henry Palmer (1840–1882). In the Journal of philology, IV (1872), pp. 1–47.

=== AP–AR ===
Aphraetes. Aphrahat or Aphraetes (c. 280 – c. 345) was a Syriac Christian author from the Sasanian Empire who composed a series of expositions on Christian doctrine and practice.

- Selections from the demonstrations of Aphrahat, the Persian sage (1898). Edited by Irish Syriast John Gwynn (1827–1917). In the Select library of Nicene and post-Nicene fathers of the Christian church, Second series, Volume XIII (1898), pp. 152–162, 343–412.
- De caritate (1930). Translated by the Syriac of Aphraetes by Frank Hudson Hallock (born 1877). In the Journal of the Society of oriental research, XIV (1930), pp. 18–31.

Aphrodito. Aphrodito is the Greek name for the ancient Egyptian town now called Per-Wadjet.

- Translations of the Greek Aphrodito papyri in the British Museum. By Harold Idris Bell (1879–1967). In Der Islam, II (1911), pp. 269–283, 372–384, III (1912), pp. 132–140, 369–373, IV (1913), pp. 87–96, XVII (1928), pp. 4–8.
- The Kurrah papyri from Aphrodito in the Oriental institute (1938). PhD. dissertation at the University of Chicago, by American papyrologist and paleographer Nabia Abbott (1897–1981).

Apicius. Apicius is a collection of Roman cookery recipes compiled between the 1st and 3rd centuries, written in a language closer to Vulgar than to Classical Latin.

- Cookery and dining in imperial Rome (1936). A bibliography, critical review and translation of the ancient book known as Apicius de re coquinaria, rendered into English by Joseph Dommers Vehling (1879–1950).

Apocrypha of the New Testament. The apocrypha of the New Testament are writings by early Christians that give accounts of Jesus and his teachings, the nature of God, or the teachings of his apostles and their lives. The works are divided into sections discussing: collections; individual Acts; Apocalypses; Gospels (collections); and individual Gospels. First, the collections.

- Ante-Nicene Christian library: translations of the writings of the fathers down to A.D. 325 (1870–1883). An edition of the Ante-Nicene Christian library, edited by Scottish Biblical scholars the Rev. Alexander Roberts (1826–1901) and Sir James Donaldson (1831–1915).
- Apocryphal Gospels, Acts, and Revelations (1870). Translated by Alexander Walker (specifics unknown). In the Ante-Nicene Christian library, 16.
- The apocryphal New Testament, being all the gospels, epistles, and other pieces now extant (1820). Published by English writer William Hone (1780–1842). Translations by Welsh Biblical critic Jeremiah Jones (1693–1724) and William Wake, archbishop of Canterbury, (1657–1737), who are uncredited.
- The Apocryphal New Testament: being the apocryphal gospels, acts, epistles, and apocalypses (1924). Newly translated by English medievalist Montague Rhodes James (1862–1936).
- A new and full method of settling the canonical authority of the New Testament (1726). Wherein all the antient testimonies concerning this argument are produced; the several Apocryphal books, which have been thought canonical by any writers, collected, with an English translation of each of them; together with a particular proof that none of them were ever admitted into the Canon, and a full answer to those, who have endeavoured to recommend them as such. Translated by Welsh Biblical critic Jeremiah Jones (1693–1724)

Apocrypha of the New Testament, Acts. The Acts of the Apostles are works of Early Christian literature, recounting the lives and works of the apostles of Jesus.

- Apocrypha sinaitica (1896). Edited and translated from Syriac and Arabic into English by oriental language scholar Margaret Dunlop Gibson (1843–1920). Includes: Anaphora Pilati, three recensions (in Syriac and Arabic); Recognitions of Clement, two recensions; Martyrdom of Clement; Preaching of Peter; Martyrdom of James, son of Alphaeus: Preaching of Simon, son of Cleophas; and Martyrdom of Simon, son of Cleophas, in Arabic.
- Apocrypha arabica (1901). By M. D. Gibson. Includes the translation of the Apocalypse of Peter down to the birth of Mary (see below).
- The Apocryphal acts of Paul, Peter, John, Andrew and Thomas (1909). By American pastor and scholar Bernhard Pick (1842–1917).
- Apocryphal Acts of the Apostles (1871). Edited from Syriac manuscripts in the British Museum and other libraries by English orientalist William Wright (1830–1889). Includes: The history of St. John at Ephesus; Decease of St. John; History of Philip; History of Mār Matthew and Mār Andrew; History of Thecla; Acts of Judas Thomas (or the Twin). Fragments of the Acts of Judas Thomas (edited and translated by F. C. Burkitt) are found in Select narratives of holy women, by Agnes Smith Lewis (1843–1926).
- The conflicts of the Holy Apostles: an apocryphal book of the early Eastern Church (1871). Translated from an Ethiopic manuscript by British orientalist Solomon Caesar Malan (1812–1894).
- The contendings of the apostles (1899). Being the histories of the lives and martyrdoms and deaths of the twelve apostles and evangelists. The Ethiopic texts are from manuscripts in the British museum. With an English translation by British Egyptologist and orientalist Sir Ernest Alfred Wallis Budge (1857–1934).
- The mythological Acts of the apostles (1904). Translated from an Arabic manuscript in the convent of Deyr-es-Suriani, Egypt, and from manuscripts. in the convent of St. Catherine on Mount Sinai and in the Vatican library, with a translation of the palimpsest fragments of the Acts of Judas Thomas from Cod. Sin. Syr. 30, by oriental language scholar Agnes Smith Lewis.
- Apocrypha anecdota, second series [Actorum Iohannis, a Leucio conscriptorum fragmentum] (1897). Translated by English medievalist Montague Rhodes James (1862–1936). In Texts and studies, contributions to Biblical and patristic literature, Volume 5, No. 1, pp. 1–26.
- The apology and acts of Apollonius and other monuments of early Christianity (1894). [Acts of Paul and Thekla.] A translation from the Armenian of the work Acts of Paul and Thecla, an apocryphal story of Paul the apostle's influence on a young virgin named Thecla. Edited with a general preface, introduction and notes by British orientalist Frederick Cornwallis Conybeare (1856–1924). Second edition entitled: The Armenian apology, & Acts of Apellenius & other monuments of early Christianity (1896).
- The book of Thekla (1901). By American theologian and Biblical scholar Edgar Johnson Goodspeed (1871–1962). In The American journal of Semitic languages and literatures, Volume XVII (1901), pp. 65–95.
- The hymn of the soul, contained in the Syriac acts of St. Thomas (1897). Also known as the Hymn of the Pearl, sometimes attributed to Bardaisan. Re-edited with an English translation by British orientalist Anthony Ashley Bevan (1859–1933). In Texts and studies, contributions to Biblical and patristic literature, Volume 5, No. 3.
- The hymn of Bargaisan (1899). Rendered into English by British theologian Francis Crawford Burkitt (1864–1935). From the colophon: The original hymn is preserved in the British Museum codex of the Acts of Judas Thomas, the apostle of India. It was first edited in the great series of Apocryphal acts published in 1871 by the late Dr. William Wright. A year ago, Professor Bevan, of Cambridge, republished the text of the Hymn with several emendations & a fresh translation. The Syriac text of the Hymn represented by the [present] translation is that published by Professor Bevan, with exceptions.
- Echoes from the Gnosis (1906). [The hymn of the robe of glory, Volume 10.] Translated by George Robert Stow Mead (1863–1933). In the Gnostic Society Library, G. R. S. Mead Collection.

Apocrypha of the New Testament, Apocalypses. Apocalyptic literature is prophetical writing that developed after the diaspora in Jewish culture and continued by early Christians.

- The revelation of the blessed apostle Paul (1866). Translated from an ancient Syriac manuscript by American missionary and linguist Justin Perkins (1805–1869). In Journal of the American Oriental Society, VIII (1864–1866), pp. 183–212, and Journal of sacred literature, n.s., VI (1865–1866), pp. 372–401.
- Apocalypse of Peter (1930–1931). Edited and translated from Kitab al-magāil (Book of the rolls) by Iraqi historian Alphonse Mingana (1878–1937). This version omits the translation of the work down to the birth of Mary In the Apocrypha arabica (see above). In Bulletin of the John Rylands Library, XIV (1930), pp. 182–297, XV (1931), pp. 179–279. Reprinted in Woodbrooke Studies: Christian Documents in Syriac, Arabic, and Garshūni (1927).
- The Evernew tongue (1905). Edited and translated by Celtic scholar Whitley Stokes (1830–1909). In Ériu, Volumes II-III (1905–1907), pp. 96–172. Text from the Book of Lismore.

Apocrypha of the New Testament, Gospels (Collections). Gospels originally referred to the Christian message, but in the 2nd century it came to be used also for the books in which the message was set out. And so, a gospel is defined as an episodic narrative of the words and deeds of Jesus of Nazareth, culminating in his trial and death, and concluding with reports of his post-resurrection appearances.

- Apocrypha syriaca (1902). The Protevangelium Jacovi and Transitus Mariae, with texts from the Septuagint, the Corân (I and II), the Peshitta, and from a Syriac hymn in a Syro-Arabic palimpsest of the 5th and other centuries. Translated by oriental language scholar Agnes Smith Lewis (1843–1926), with an appendix of Palestinian Syriac texts from the Taylor-Schechter collection. In Studia sinaitica, Volume XI (1902),
- The apocryphal gospels and other documents relating to the history of Christ (1867). Translated from the originals in Greek, Latin, Syriac, etc., with notes, spiritual references and prolegomena by Benjamin Harris Cowper. Includes: Gospel of James (Protevangelium), Gospel of Pseudo-Matthew, or of the Infancy of Mary and of Jesus; Gospel of the Nativity of Mary; History of Joseph the Carpenter; Gospel of Thomas; Arabic Gospel of the Infancy; Letters of Jesus and Abgar; Letter of Lentulus; Prayer of Jesus, Son of Mary; Story of Veronica; Gospel of Nicodemus (Acts of Pilate, Revenging of the Saviour); Descent of Christ to the Underworld; various documents concerning Pilate; Story of Joseph of Arimathea; and Syriac Gospel of the Boyhood of our Lord Jesus.
- Contributions to the apocryphal literature of the New Testament: collected and edited from Syriac manuscripts in the British Museum (1865). With an English translation and notes by William Wright (1830–1889). Includes: Protevangelium Jacovi (The history of the birth of our Lord and of the Virgin Mary; (Infancy) Gospel of Thomas the Israelite; Letters of Herod and Pilate; Transitus, Assumptio, or Beatæ Virginis (Assumption of Mary); and, the Obsequies of the Holy Virgin.
- Coptic Biblical texts in the dialect of Upper Egypt (1912). With English translation by British Egyptologist and orientalist Sir Ernest Alfred Wallis Budge (1857–1934). Includes the following apocrypha: The book of the resurrection of Jesus Christ by Bartholomew the Apostle; The repose of Saint John the Evangelist and Apostle; The mysteries of Saint John the Apostle and the Holy Virgin; and Encomiun on John the Baptist, attributed to John Chrysostom.
- Coptic apocryphal Gospels (1896). Translated, with texts of some of them, by Forbes Robinson (1867–1904). Includes: Fragments of the Life of the Virgin; accounts of the Falling asleep of Mary; Death of Joseph; and, various fragments. In Texts and studies, contributions to Biblical and patristic literature, Volume 4, No. 2.
- Excluded books of the New Testament (1927). Translated by bishop Joseph Barber Lightfoot (1828–1889), M. R. James, H. B. Swete and others. With an introduction by English priest and scholar Joseph Armitage Robinson (1858–1933). Reprints of standard translations. Contains: The Book of James; Gospel of Nicodemus; Gospel of Peter; Revelation of Peter; Genuine Epistle of S. Clement; The so-called Second Epistle of S. Clement; Epistle of Barnabas, and The Shepherd of Hermas.
- The Gospel of the twelve apostles together with the apocalypses of each one of them (1900). Edited from the Syriac manuscript with a translation and introduction by English Biblical scholar James Rendel Harris (1852–1941). From a contemporaneous 8th century manuscript. Apocalypses of only Simon Kepha, James and John the Little are given.

Apostolic Church-Order. The Apostolic Church-Order (Apostolic Church-Ordinance or Constitutio Ecclesiastica Apostolorum), dated from the end of 3rd century, is an Orthodox Christian treatise called an ancient church order offering authoritative apostolic prescriptions on matters of moral conduct and liturgy. The first part is an adaptation of the Didache and the second relates to ecclesiastic organization.

- The apostolical constitutions: or, Canons of the apostles, in Coptic with an English translation (1848). Translated by English clergyman and Coptic scholar Henry Tattum (1788–1868). Printed for the Oriental translation fund of Great Britain and Ireland.
- An entire Syriac text of the Apostolic church order (1902). Edited and translated by the Rev. John Peter Arendzen (1873–1954). In the Journal of theological studies, III (1902).
- The statutes of the apostles: or, Canones ecclesiastici (1904). Edited with translation and collation from Ethiopic and Arabic manuscripts by British Biblical scholar George William Horner (1849–1930). Also a translation of the Saidic and collation of the Bohairic versions; and Saidic fragments.

Apostolic Fathers. The Apostolic Fathers were the Christian theologians among the Church Fathers who lived in the 1st and 2nd centuries AD, who are believed to have personally known some of the Twelve Apostles, or to have been influenced by them to the extent that their writings reflect genuine Apostolic teaching.

- The genuine epistles of the Apostolic fathers (1834). Concerning St. Clement, St. Polycarp, St. Ignatius, St. Barnabas; the Shepherd of Hermas, and the martyrdoms of St. Ignatius and St. Polycarp, written by those who were present at their sufferings. Translated by William Wake (1657–1737), archbishop of Canterbury, with preliminary discourses relating to the several treatises here put together by the same author. Arranged by William Adams (1706–1789), master of Pembroke. To which is added biographical notices, abridged from Lives of the most eminent fathers of the church that flourished in the first four centuries (1683) by William Cave (1637–1713).

Apostolical Constitutions. The Apostolic Constitutions (Constitutions of the Holy Apostles) is a collection of eight treatises which belongs to the ancient church order offering authoritative apostolic prescriptions on matters of moral conduct, liturgy and Church organization.

- Primitive Christianity reviv'd in four volumes (1712). By English theologian and historian William Whiston (1667–1752). Containing: Volume I. The larger Epistles of Ignatius; Volume II. The Apostolical constitutions; Volume III. An essay on those constitutions; Volume IV. An account of the primitive faith concerning the Trinity and incarnation. Volumes II and III reprinted in the works by I. Chase, R. Wedgwood and J. Donaldson below.
- The work claiming to be the constitutions of the holy apostles, including the canons, Whiston's version (1848). Translated by American clergyman Irah Chase (1793–1864).
- Primitive Christianity (1851). By R. Wedgwood. The constitutions or decrees of the Holy Apostles; being the commandments or ordinances given to them by the Lord Jesus Christ, for the establishment and government of His kingdom on the earth.
- Apostolical constitutions (1870). Edited by Scottish classical scholar Sir James Donaldson (1831–1915). In the Ante-Nicene Christian library, XVII (Part II), Works related to Ante-Nicene Fathers at Wikisource, VII.

Apuleius Barbarus. Apuleius Barbarus, known as Pseudo-Apuleius, is the name given to the author of a 4th-century herbal known as Herbarium Apuleii Platonici. The author of the text apparently wished readers to think that it was by Roman poet and philosopher Apuleius of Madaura (124–170).

- Leechdoms, wortcunning, and starcraft of early England (1864–1866). Collected and edited by English philologist the Rev. Thomas Oswald Cockayne (1807–1873). Being a collection of documents, for the most part never before printed, illustrating the history of science in this country before the Norman conquest. Includes De temporibus by English abbot Ælfric of Eynsham (c. 955 – c. 1010). In Rerum Britannicarum Medii Ævi Scriptores 35 (Rolls Series).

Arabian Nights. Arabian Nights, or One Thousand and One Nights, is a collection of Middle Eastern folk tales compiled in Arabic (known as Alf Layla wa-Layla) during the Islamic Golden Age. First translated as Les mille et une nuits in French, it is often known in English as The Arabian Nights' Entertainment.

- A Bibliography of the Arabian Nights in the 18th Century (2012). By Tetsuo Nishio. In the Bulletin of the National Museum of Ethnology 36(4).
- Les mille et une nuits (1704–1717). The first European translation of One Thousand and One Nights by French orientalist and archaeologist Antoine Galland (1646 –1715).
- Arabian Night's entertainments: consisting of one thousand and one stories, told by the sultaness of the Indies (1706). Translated into French from the Arabian manuscripts by M. Galland; and now done into English. Multiple editions through 1802.
- The Arabian nights (1802). Translated by English cleric and miscellany writer Rev. Edward Forster (1769–1828). With engravings from pictures by Robert Smirke (1753–1845).
- New Arabian Nights Entertainment (1827). Selected from the original oriental manuscript by Austrian orientalist and historian Joseph von Hammer-Purgstall (1774–1856) and translated by British politician and writer George Lamb (1784–1834).
- The thousand and one nights, or, The Arabian nights' entertainments (1840). Translated and arranged for family reading, with explanatory notes, by Edward William Lane (1801–1876). Illustrated with six hundred woodcuts by Harvey and illuminated titles by Owen Jones.
- The book of the thousand nights and one night (1882–1884). Now first completely done into English prose and verse, from the original Arabic. Translated by English poet John Payne (1842–1916). The Arabic original descends from an unknown text, now lost, which is represented by Galland's manuscript and the modern Egyptian recession.
- The Book of the Thousand Nights and a Night (1885). Subtitled: A Plain and Literal Translation of the Arabian Nights Entertainments. Translated by Sir Richard Francis Burton (1821–1890), a British explorer, writer, translator and Arabist.
- Alaeddin and the enchanted lamp; Zein Ul Asnam and the King of the Jinn (1889). Two stories done into English from the recently discovered Arabic text by John Payne, dedicated to Sir Richard Burton.
- The Arabian nights' entertainments (1891). Vignette edition, revised with notes by the Rev. George Fyler Townsend (1814–1900) and two hundred new illustrations by Thomas McIlvaine.
- Scheherezade: tales from The thousand and one nights (1953). Translated by British orientalist Arthur John Arberry (1905–1969).
- The Arabian Nights Reader and Bibliography (2006). By Ulrich Marzolph.

Arabic literature (collections). Arabic literature is a broad subject that touches on pre-Islamic and Islamic religious texts, fiction, poetry, biographies, geography and travel, legal texts and treatises, culinary, and histories/chronologies. Works are generally discussed in this article by author or topic (e.g., Abbasid Caliphate, Arabian nights), and the list below focuses on collections of works, primarily poetry. A bibliography can be found in Sacred books and early literature of the East, Volume VI, pp. 397–398.

- Translations of Eastern poetry and prose (1922). By English orientalist Reynold Alleyne Nicholson (1868–1945). Later edition (1987) includes an introduction by Clifford Edmund Bosworth (1928–2015). From the author's introduction: "This book, containing versions from about fifty authors may be of use to some who are interested in the two great literatures of Islam-Arabic and Persian. Theology, law, philosophy, science and medicine are scarcely touched, but the reader will learn something of Islamic history and religion, morals and manners, culture and character; something, too, of the heathen Arabs to whom Mohammed was sent."
- Studies in Islamic poetry (1921). By R. A. Nicholson (1868–1945). Includes the Meditations of Ma'arri by Abū al-ʿAlāʾ al-Maʿarrī.
- Arabian poetry for English readers (1881). By Scottish folklorist William Alexander Clouston (1843–1896). The contents include: The Mu'allaqāt, translated by Sir William Jones; Specimens of Arabic poetry, by J. D. Carlyle (see below); an epitome of the first part of the Romance of Antar, interspersed with selections from the translation of Terrick Hamilton; the Burda, or Poem of the mantle, by Ka'b ibn Zuhair (fl. 632), and another poem of the same title by Sufi poet al-Busiri (13th century), both translated by James W. Redhouse.
- Arabic wisdom: selections and translations from the Arabic (1907). By John Wortabet (1827–1908). In the Wisdom of the East series
- Studies in Arabic literary papyri (1957). By American papyrologist and paleographer Nabia Abbott (1897–1981).
- Arabic documents from the Monneret collection (1929). Edited and translated by David Samuel Margoliouth (1858–1940) and Eric John Holmyard (1891–1959). In Islamica IV (1929–1931), pp. 249–271.
- The oriental caravan: a revelation of the soul and mind of Asia (1933). Arabic and Persian works by various translators, edited by Indian-Afghan author Sirdar Ikbad Ali Shah. (1894–1969).
- Poetry of the Orient: an anthology of the classic secular poetry of major eastern nations (1928). Edited by Eugene Tietjens (born 1884).
- Pre-Islamic poets, with examples of their works (1908). Translated out of the Arabic and adapted into English verse by Arthur Clark Kennedy. Poems of Imru' al-Qais, 'Antarah ibn Shaddad (Antar, see above), al-K'hansa and Tarafa ibn 'Abd al-Bakri.
- Ancient Arabia (1917). Volume V of Sacred books and early literature of the East, with a historical survey and descriptions by Charles Francis Horn (1870-1942). Includes: The Genius of Arabic Literature by Sheik Faiz-ullah bhai; The hanged poems; and the Koran. Various translators.
- Medieval Arabic, Moorish and Turkish (1917). Volume VI of Sacred books and early literature of the East, with a historical survey and descriptions by C. F. Horn. Includes: selections from the Sunnah, or Sayings and traditions of Muhammad; selections from al-Masudi's Meadows of gold and mines of gems; al-Ghazzāli's Confessions; al-Hariri's Assemblies; Arabian poems by various authors; brief selections from Moorish and Turkish literature. Various translators.
- Specimens of Arabian poetry: from the earliest time to the extinction of the khaliphat, with some account of the authors (1796). By English orientalist Joseph Dacre Carlyle (1759–1804).
- Specimens of pre-Islamitic Arabic poetry, selected and translated from the Hamasah (1881). By Hungarian orientalist Edward Rehatsek (1819–1891). In the Journal of the Bombay Branch of the Royal Asiatic Society, XV (1881–1882), pp. 65–108. The Kitab al-Hamasah is an anthology of Arabic poetry compiled by 'Abū Tammām.
- Translations of ancient Arabian poetry, chiefly præ-Islamic, with an introduction and notes (1885). By British orientalist Sir Charles James Lyall (1845–1920)
- Week-end caravan (1937). An anthology of prose and verse translations from Arabic, Persian and Turkish, and of passages relating to the Islamic countries. By Sigmar Hillelson.

Arcandam. Arcandam was a celebrated astrological pseudonym of the sixteenth century, under which books of predictions were published in Latin and French from about 1540.

- The most excellent, profitable and pleasant book, of the famous doctor and expert astrologian Arcandam or Aleandrin to finde the fatal destiny, ... child, by his birth (1592). By William Warde.
- De ueritatibus et predictionibus astrologie (1542). Text attributed to Arcandam. In Arabic astronomical and astrological sciences in Latin translation: a critical bibliography (1956). By Francis James Carmody (1907–1982).

Archelaus. Archelaus (fl. 278) was the bishop of Carrhae. He held a public dispute with the heretic Manichaeists, an account of which he published in Syriac, later translated into Greek and Latin.

- The acts of disputation of Archelaus, bishop of Cashar in Mesopotamia, with the heresiarch Manes (1871). Translated by Scottish educator Stewart Dingwall Fordyce Salmond (1838–1905). In the Ante-Nicene Christian library, Volume VI–Fathers of the Third Century (cf. works related to Ante-Nicene Fathers at Wikisource).

Arde'et. Arde'et: The magic book of the disciples (1904). Ethiopic text with a translation by German orientalist Enno Littmann (1875–1958). In the Journal of the American Oriental Society, XXV (1904), pp. 1–48. The book relates how Jesus taught the disciples his secret names by power of which they were able to perform miracles.

Arderne, John. John Arderne (1307–1392) was an English surgeon, considered one of the fathers of surgery.

- Treatises of fistula in ano, haemorrhoids, and clysters (1910). Translated by English medical historian Sir D'Arcy Power (1855–1941). Published for the Early English Text Society, 139.
- De arte phisicali et de cirurgia of Master John Arderne, surgeon of Newark; dated 1412 (1922). Translated by D. Power.

Aretino, Leonardo. See Leonardo Arentino Bruni.

Ari Þorgilsson Fróði. Ari Þorgilsson Fróði (1067–1148). Known as Ari the Wise, he was a prominent Icelandic medieval chronicler. He is the author of Íslendingabók, which details the histories of the various families who settled Iceland.

- The book of the Icelanders (Íslendingabók) (1930). Edited and translated with an introductory essay and motes by Halldór Hermansson (1878–1958). In Islandica, Volume 20 (1930). (cf. Icelandic Wikipedia, Halldór Hermansson)

'Ārilī, Mahmud. Mahmud 'Ārilī (died 1449) was a Persian poet who received a polo pony and 1000 dinars from a prince, Sultan Muhammad, for his work Guy va chugan.

- The ball and the polo stick (1932). Translated by R. S. Greenshields. In the Journal of the Royal Asiatic Society of Great Britain and Ireland, 1931 (4), 898-898.

Ariosto, Ludovico. Ludovico Ariosto (1474–1533) ) was an Italian poet, best known as the author of Orlando Furioso, a continuation of Bojardo's Orlando Innamorato. The work describes the adventures of Charlemagne and Roland as they battle against the Saracens.

- Orlando furioso: In Italian and English (1755). Translated by Temple Henry Croker (c. 1730 – c. 1790).
- Orlando furioso (1799). Translated from the Italian of Lodovico Ariosto with notes by English translator John Hoole (1727–1803).
- The Orlando furioso (1823–1831). Translated into English verse from the Italian of Ludovico Ariosto with notes by British poet William Stewart Rose (1775–1843).
- The romances of chivalry in Italian verse: selections (1904). Edited by Jeremiah Denis Matthias Ford Ford (1873–1958) and Mary A. Ford.

Aristaenetus. Aristaenetus (5th century) was a Greek epistolographer who published books of love stories in the form of letters.

- Six select epistles out of Aristaenetus (1701). In Letters of wit, politicks and morality, by French-English lexicographer Abel Boyer (1667–1729).
- Letters of love and gallantry, written in Greek by Aristaenetus (1715). Anonymous prose translation of two books of the letters.
- The love epistles of Aristænetus (1771). Translated by Irish playwright Richard Brinsley Sheridan (1751–1816) and English philologist Nathaniel Brassey Halhed (1751–1830).

Aristides, Marcianus. Saint Marcianus Aristides, or Aristides the Athenian (2nd century), was Christian Greek author who wrote the Apology of Aristides.

- The apology of Aristides on behalf of the Christians (1891). From a Syriac manuscript preserved on Mount Sinai. Edited with an introduction and translation by English Biblical scholar James Rendel Harris (1852–1941). With an appendix containing the main portion of the original Greek text, by English scholar and priest Joseph Armitage Robinson (1858–1933).
- The apology of Aristides (1896). Translated from the Greek and from the Syriac version by David Miller Kay. In the Ante-Nicene Christian library, Volume IX - Recently Discovered Additions to Early Christian Literature; Commentaries of Origen. (cf. works related to Ante-Nicene Fathers at Wikisource)
- The apology of Aristides (1909). Translated from the Greek by W. S. Walford.

Arithmetical treatises. Works on arithmetic, primarily discussing algorisms, an arithmetic technique first codified by Persian mathematician al-Khwārizmī (c. 780 – 850). The word algorism later became algorithm, modeled after the word logarithm, and is a transcription of al-Khwārizmī's name.

- Robert of Chester's Latin translation of the Algebra of al-Khowarizmi (1915). By English Arabist Robert of Chester (12th century), with an introduction, notes and an English translation by American mathematician Louis Charles Karpinski (1878–1956).
- An Anglo-Norman algorism of the fourteenth century (1935). Edited and translated by L. C. Karpinski and Charles N. Staubach. In Isis, XXIII (1935), pp. 121–152.
- A fifteenth century French algorism from Liége (1929). Edited and translated by Edwin George Ross Waters (1890–1931). Ibid, XII (1929), pp. 194–236.
- The first printed arithmetic (Treviso, 1478) (1924). By David E. Smith. Ibid, VI (1924), pp. 311–331.
- A thirteenth century French algorism in French verse (1928). Edited and translated by E. G. R. Waters. Ibid, XI (1928), pp. 45–84.
- Two twelfth century algorisms (1920). By L. C. Karpinski. Ibid, III (1920–1921), pp. 396–413.
- The algebra of Mohammed ben Musa [al-Khwārizmī] (1831). By Friedrich August Rosen (1805–1837).

Arnaldus de Villa Nova. Arnaldus de Villa Nova (c. 1240 – 1311) was a Catalonian physician, alchemist and astrologer.

- Arnold of Villanova on epilepsy (1938). Translated by Edna F. von Storch and Theo. J. C. von Storch. In Annals of medical history, n.s. X (1938), pp. 251–260.
- The earliest printed book on wine, by Arnald of Villanova (1943). Rendered into English and with a historical essay by Swiss medical historian Henry E. Sigerist (1891–1957).
- Arnaldi de Villanova Opera medica omnia (1981). Edited and translated by Michael Rogers McVaugh (born 1938).

Arnobius. Arnobius (died c. 330) was an Early Christian apologist of Berber origin who flourished during the reign of Diocletian.

- The seven books of Arnobius Adversus gentes (1871). Translated by Hamilton Bryce (1824–1904) and Hugh Campbell (1847–1931). In the Ante-Nicene Christian library, Volume VI - The Fathers of the Third Century. (cf. works related to Ante-Nicene Fathers at Wikisource)

Ars moriendi. The Ars moriendi (the art of dying) are Latin texts dating from the 15th century which offer advice on the protocols and procedures of a good death according to Christian precepts of the late Middle Ages. It was written within the historical context of the Black Death 60 years earlier.

- A reprint in facsimile of a treatise spekynge of the arte & crafte to knowe well to dye. London: Sold by the assigns of E. Lumley deceased (1875). From an abridgement by English merchant and writer William Caxton (c. 1422 – c. 1491).
- The book of the craft of dying, and other early English tracts concerning death (1917). Taken from manuscripts and printed books in the British museum and Bodleian libraries. Edited by Frances Margaret Mary Comper, with a preface by the Rev. George Congreve (1835–1918).

Ars notoria notarie. Ars notoria notarie (the notory art of shorthand) was a method of shorthand writing used within the late medieval scribal culture. It was used by early modern hermetic writers including Agrippa of Nettesheim and John Dee, the latter having owned one of the three manuscripts of the work below.

- The Notory Art of Shorthand (2014). Discusses a unique branch of one of the most popular magic treatises of the Middle Ages, the Ars notoria; a rare report on medieval paleography and the notarial trade; an exposé of a unique medieval cipher based on the famous Tironian notes. Translated by John Dickinson Haines. In Dallas Medieval Texts and Translations, 20.

Artephius. Artephius (Artefius) (c. 1150) was a writer of a number of texts on alchemy, some of which are in Arabic.

- The secret book of Artephius (1624). Translated into English by Eirenaeus Orandus. Published with His Exposition of the Hieroglyphicall Figures which he caused to bee painted upon an Arch in St. Innocents Church-yard, in Paris, by French scribe and alchemist Nicholas Flamel (1330–1418).
- Artephii liber secretus, in Medicina practica, or, Practical physick (1692). By English medical writer William Salmon (1644–1713).
- Artefius and his Clavis Sapientiae (1938). By G. Levi della Vida. In Speculum 13: 80–85.

Arthurian legend. The legend of King Arthur consumes a great deal of English literature, and is closely associated with the Matter of Britain (Matière de Bretagne), the body of Medieval literature of the legendary kings of Great Britain and Brittany. As noted by Keary, the bibliography of the historic Arthur is small, but that of the mythic Arthur is almost infinite. See also Chrétien de Troyes, in List of English translations: C. Some translations include the following (see also Thomas Malory).

- The History of the Kings of Britain (Historia Regum Britanniae) (c. 1136). By Geoffrey of Monmouth (1095 – c. 1155), a Catholic cleric from Monmouth, Wales, and one of the major figures in the development of British historiography and the popularity of tales of King Arthur.
- The history of the valiant knight Arthur of Little Britain: A romance of chivalry (1814). Originally translated from the French by John Berners Bourchier (1467–1533) and updated by English literary antiquary Edward Vernon Utterson (1775–1856).
- Arthur and Gorlagon (1904). Translated from a 14th-century Latin manuscript by F. A. Milne, with notes by British publisher Alfred Trübner Nutt (1856–1910), who wrote about folklore and Celtic studies. In Folklore, XV (1904), pp. 40–67.
- The presumed exhumation of Arthur and Guinevere (1912). An unpublished Welsh account based on Giraldus Cambrensis (c. 1146 – c. 1223), historian and archdeacon of Brecon. Edited and translated by Timothy Lewis and James Douglas Bruce (1862–1923). In Revue celtique, XXXIII (1912), pp. 432–451.
- The evolution of Arthurian romance from the beginnings down to the year 1300 (1928). By J. D. Bruce.
- A Welsh version of the birth of Arthur (1913). From a fifteenth century manuscript, edited and translated by J. H. Davies. In Y Cymmrodor, XXIV (1913), pp. 247–264.
- Y Seint Greal (1876). The adventures of King Arthur's knights of the Round Table in their quest for the Holy Greal, and on other occasions. Originally written about the year 1200. Edited and translated by the Rev. Robert Williams (1810–1881). Also published in Selections from the Hengwrt manuscripts preserved in the Peniarth library (1876), Volume I.
- The Arthurian epic: a comparative study of the Cambrian, Breton, and Anglo-Norman versions of the story and Tennyson's Idylls of the King (1895). By Stephen Humphreys Villiers Gurteen (1840–1898).
- Arthurian Legends. In A manual of the writings in Middle English,1050–1400 (1923–1927), Chapter I.2, pp. 27–81. By John Edwin Wells (1875–1943).
- The British Edda (1930). The great epic poem of the ancient Britons on the exploits of King Thor, Arthur or Adam and his knights in establishing civilization, reforming Eden and capturing the Holy Grail about 3380-3350 BC. Reconstructed for first time from the medieval mss, by Babylonian, Hittite, Egyptian, Trojan and Gothic keys, and done literally into English by L. A. Waddell. A reinterpretation of the poems, attempting to link them to England.
- Bibliography of works about King Arthur.

Artus de Bretagne. A knight not to be confused with Arthur of the Round Table.

- The history of the valiant knight Arthur of Little Britain: A romance of chivalry (1814). By English literary antiquary, Edward Vernon Utterson (1775–1856), using a translation by John Berners Bourchier (1467–1533).

=== AS–AZ ===
Assault of Massoura. The Assault of Massoura (Battle of Mansurah) was fought in February 1250 between the Crusader forces of Louis IX of France and the Ayyubid forces of Shajar al-Durr and Baibars.

- Poem describing the Assault of Massoura; and more particularly the valiant Conduct and Death of William de Longespee, commonly called Earl of Salisbury, and of several English Knights, in the Crusade by St. Louis King of France, in February 1250. A poem by an anonymous Englishman in Excerpta historica, or, Illustrations of English history (1831), pp. 64–84, by English printer and antiquarian. Samuel Bentley (1785–1868). From the Cotton Manuscript, British Museum.

Asser, John. John Asser (died c. 909) was bishop of Sherborne who joined the court of Alfred the Great. In 893, he wrote the biography Life of King Alfred.

- Annals of the reign of Alfred the Great from A.D. 849 to A.D. 887 (1848). In Six old English chronicles, by English historian John Allen Giles (1808–1884).
- Annals of the exploits of Alfred the Great (1854). In The Church historians of England (1853–1858), Volume II, Part 2, pp. 451–479, translated from the originals by English archivist Joseph Stevenson (1806–1895).
- Of the deeds of Alfred (De Ælfredi rebus gestis) (1900). In Alfred in the chroniclers, pp. 183–119. Edited and translated by John William Edward Conybeare (born 1843).
- Asser's Life of King Alfred: together with the Annals of Saint Neots erroneously ascribed to Asser (1904). Translation by J. Stevenson.
- Asser's life of King Alfred (1906). Translated from the text of J. Stevenson by American philologist Albert Stanburrough Cook (1853–1927).
- Asser's life of King Alfred (1908). Translated with notes by Lionel Cecil Jane (1879–1932).

Asterius. Saint Asterius of Amasea (c. 350 – c. 410 AD) was bishop of Amasea from 380 and 390, and his writings were overshadowed by the more famous Amphilochius of Iconium and the Cappadocian Fathers. Portions of his sermons survive, presenting the point of view of art history and social life in his day.

- Ancient sermons for modern times, by Asterius, bishop of Amasia, circa 375-405 A.D. (1904). Put into English from the Greek by American theologians Galusha Anderson (1832–1918) and Edgar Johnson Goodspeed (1871–1962).

Astronomy and astrology. Medieval works on astronomy and astrology include the following.

- Arabic astronomical and astrological sciences in Latin translation: a critical bibliography (1956). By Francis James Carmody (1907–1982).
- Irish Astronomical Tract (1914). Based in part on a medieval Latin version of a work by Persian polymath Mashallah ibn Athari (c. 740 – 815). Edited with preface, translation and glossary by Sister Maura Power (1888–1916). Irish Texts Society, 14.
- A treatise on the astrolabe, addressed to his son Lowys (1872). By Geoffrey Chaucer, A.D. 1391. An edition of A Treatise on the Astrolabe, edited from the earliest manuscripts by British philologist Rev. Walter William Skeat (1835–1912).
- The astronomical tables of al-Khwārizmī (1902). Translation of Persian mathematician Muḥammad ibn Mūsā al-Khwārizmī (c. 780 – c. 850), with commentaries of the Latin version edited by Heinrich Suter (1848–1922), supplemented by Corpus Christi College ms. 283, by Otto Eduard Neugebauer (1899–1990).
- Anima astrologiæ; or, A guide for astrologers (1886). Being the one hundred and forty-six considerations of the famous astrologer, Guido Bonatus, translated from the Latin by astrologer and mathematician Henry Coley (1633–1704).

Athanasius of Alexandria. Athanasius of Alexandria (296/298 – 373) was 20th bishop of Alexandria (as Athanasius I).

- Select writings of Athanasius, Bishop of Alexandria. (1892). Edited, with prolegomena, indices and tables by Archibald Thomas Robertson (1863–1934). In Select library of Nicene and post-Nicene fathers of the Christian church, Second series, Volume IV (1892). The most complete collection of works of Athanasius.
- Historical tracts of S. Athanasius, Archbishop of Alexandria (1843). Translated by English cleric Miles Atkinson (1741–1811), with notes and indices. Edited by Cardinal John Henry Newman (1801–1890).
- A library of fathers of the holy Catholic church: anterior to the division of the East and West (1838–1881). Volumes VIII, XIX: Select treatises in controversy with the Arians, Parts 1 and 2 (1842), translated by John H. Newman. Volume XIII: Historical tracts (1843), translated by Miles Atkinson. Volume XXXVIII: The festal epistles (1854), translated by Henry Burgess (1808–1886). Volume LXVI: Later treatises of S. Athanasius, Archbishop of Alexandria, with notes: and an appendix on S. Cyril of Alexandia and Theodoret (1881), translated by William Bright (1824–1901).

Athanasius of Antioch. Athanasius I Gammolo (died 631) was patriarch of Antioch from c. 594 through 631.

- The conflict of Severus: patriarch of Antioch. by Athanasius (1908). A biography of Severus of Antioch with Ethiopic text edited and translated by American theologian and Biblical scholar Edgar Johnson Goodspeed (1871–1962). With the remains of the Coptic versions by Scottish Coptologist Walter Ewing Crum (1865–1944). In Patrologia Orientalis, Volume IV, Part 6 (1908).

Athenagoras. Athenagoras (c. 133 – c. 190) was a Father of the Church, an Ante-Nicene Christian apologist.

- The Apologeticks of the learned Athenian philosopher Athenagoras (1714). Against the scepticks and infidels of that age. Together with a curious fragment of Justin Martyr on the subject of the resurrection, not published in his works. And two other fragments: the one attributed to Josephus; the other to Methodius, concerning the state of the dead. Both from the manuscripts of the late Rev. John Ernest Grabe. To which are prefixed two dissertations: the one concerning the Jewish notion of the resurrection; the other concerning Athenagoras and his remains. Done into English with notes by David Humphreys (1689–1740), with the original Greek printed in the appendix.
- The apology and The resurrection of the dead (1857). In The writings of the early Christians of the 2nd century: namely, Athanagoras, Tatian, Theophilus, Hermias, Papias, Aristides, Quadratus, etc. (1857). Collected together and first translated complete by English historian John Allen Giles (1808–1884).
- The writings of Athenagoras (1870). In the Ante-Nicene Christian library, Volume II–Fathers of the Second Century (cf. works related to Ante-Nicene Fathers at Wikisource).

Athirne. Athirne was a poet and satirist of the court of Conchobar mac Nessa in the Ulster Cycle of Irish mythology, who abuses the privileges of poets.

- The guesting of Athirne (1914). Edited and translated by Kuno Meyer. In Ériu, Volume VII (1914), pp. 1–9.
- Tochmarc Luaine focus Aided Athairne: The wooing of Luaine and death of Athirne (1903). Edited and translated by Whitley Stokes. In Revue celtique, XXIV (1903), pp. 270–287. The story of the demise of Athirne Ailgheasach.

Aubert, David. David Aubert (before 1413 – after 1479) was a French calligrapher who transcribed and adapted courtly romances and chronicles.

- The three kings' sons (1895). English from the French (Part 1 only published). Edited from its unique manuscript. Harleian 326, about 1500 A. D., by English philologist Frederick James Furnivall (1825–1910). Published for the Early English Text Society, Extra Series 67 (1885).

Aucassin and Nicolette. Aucassin and Nicolette is a translation of an anonymous 12th or 13th century French story Aucassin et Nicolette, an example of a chantefable (sung story), a combination of prose and verse.

- Aucassin and Nicolette: the lovers of Provence (1880). A ms. song-story of the twelfth century, rendered into modern French by illustrator and translator Alexandre Bida (1813–1895). Translated into English verse and prose by A. Rodney Macdonough.
- Aucassin and Nicolette (1910). Done into English by Andrew Lang (1844-–1912).

'Aufi, Muhammad. Muhammad 'Aufī (1171–1242), also known as Sadīd ud-Dīn Muhammad Ibn Muhammad 'Aufī Bukhārī or Nour ud-Dīn, was a Persian historian, philologist, and author.

- An early Persian anthology (1921). In Studies in Islamic poetry, translated by English orientalist Reynold Alleyne Nicholson (1868–1945) An English edition of 'Aufi's Lubab ul-Albab.
- Jámiu-l Hikäyát of Muhammad 'Úfi (1869). In History of India, as Told by its Own Historians, The Muhammadan Period, Volume II, pp. 155–203. A translation of 'Aufi's Jawāmi ul-Hikāyāt by a munshi, with a thorough revision by the editor, British Indologist John Dowson (1820–1881).

Augustine of Canterbury. Augustine of Canterbury (died 604) was a Benedictine monk and the first Archbishop of Canterbury in the year 597.

- The mission of St Augustine to England according to the original documents, being a handbook for the thirteenth centenary (1897). Edited by English theologian Arthur James Mason (1851–1928).

Augustine of Hippo. Augustine of Hippo (354–430), also known as Saint Augustine or Aurelius Augustine, was a theologian, philosopher, and the bishop of Hippo Regius.

- The works of Aurelius Augustine (1872–1876). Edited by Marcus Dods (1834–1909). Translated by: M. Dods; John Richard King (1835–1907); Robert Ernest Wallis (1820–1900); J. G. Pilkington; James Innes (1832–1894); John Gibb (1835–1915); S. D. F. Salmond (1838–1905) William Findlay (born 1830); Arthur West Haddan (1816–1873); John George Cunningham (born 1835); Richard Stothert (1833–1898); and Peter Holmes (1815–1878).
- Augustine of Hippo Bibliography.

Aungerville, Richard. Richard Aungerville (1287–1345), also known as Richard de Bury, was an English teacher, bishop, writer, and bibliophile. His role as one of the first English collectors of books is shown in his work Philobiblon, one of the earliest books to provide an in-depth discussion of librarianship.

- Philobiblon: a treatise on the love of books (1861). Translated by John Bellingham Inglis (1780–1870). Collated and corrected by Samuel Hand.
- The love of books: the Philobiblon of Richard de Bury, bishop of Durham and chancellor to Edward III (1888). Edited and translated by Ernest Chester Thomas (1850–1892). (cf. Wikisource)
- A miscellany containing: Richard of Bury's Philobiblon, the Basilikon doron of King James I; Monks and giants (1888). By Henry Morley (1822–1894).
- The Philobiblon of Richard de Bury (1889). Edited from the best manuscripts and translated into English with an introduction and notes by Andrew Fleming West (1853–1943).

Auraicept na n-Éces. Auraicept na n-Éces (the scholars' primer) is believed to be a 7th-century work of Irish grammarians, written by a scholar named Longarad. The core of the text may date to the mid-7th century, but much material was added between that date and the production of the earliest surviving copy in the 12th century. The work includes the texts of the Ogham tract from the Book of Ballymote and the Yellow book of Lecan, and the text of the Trefhocul from the Book of Leinster.

- Auraicept na n-éces: the scholars' primer; being the texts of the Ogham tract from the Book of Ballymote and the Yellow book of Lecan, and the text of the Trefhocul from the Book of Leinster (1917). Edited from eight manuscripts, with introduction, translation of the Ballymote text, notes, and indices by George Calder.

Ausonius, Decimus Magnus. Decimius Magnus Ausonius (c. 310 – c. 395) was a Roman poet and teacher of rhetoric from Bordeaux, France.

- Ausonius (1919). With an English translation by Hugh Gerard Evelyn-White (1884–1924).
- Poems by Decimus Magnus Ausonius: Patchwork quilt (1939). Done into English by Jack Lindsay (1900–1990), with decorations by Edward Bawden.
- Cupid crucified, in Poems and translations (1647). By English author and translator Thomas Stanley (1625–1678).

Auto de los reyes magos. The Auto de los reyes magos is the oldest extant liturgical drama (12th century) written in Spanish language. It is a mystery play belonging to the Christmas cycle about the Biblical Magi. It is believed to have been based on an earlier liturgical Latin play written in France.

- Auto de los reyes (1928). Translated by Willis Knapp-Jones. In Poet lore, XXXIX (1928), pp. 306–309.

Averroës. Averroës (1126–1198), also known as ibn Rushd, was an Andalusian polymath and jurist.

- The Philosophy and Theology of Averroes (1921). Tractacta, translated from the Arabic by Mohammad Jamil-Ub-Behman Barod.
- Averroeana, being a transcript of several letters from Averroes an Arabian philosopher at Corduba in Spain, to Metrodorus a young Grecian nobleman, student at Athens in the years 1149 and 1150 (1695). Transcriptions of letters of Averroës and Metrodorus. It is unknown whether these letters are part of some work of Averroës or forgeries.

Avicenna. Avicenna, known as ibn Sina (c. 980 – 1037), was a Persian polymath who is regarded as the father of early modern medicine. His works were mostly written in Arabic and include The Book of Healing, a philosophical and scientific encyclopedia, and The Canon of Medicine, a medical encyclopedia.

- A compendium on the soul (1906). Translated by Edward Abbott Van Dyck.
- Avicenna's treatise on logic: (A concise philosophical encyclopaedia) and autobiography (1971). Edited and translated from the original Persian by Farhang Zabeeh.
- The Metaphysica of Avicenna (ibn Sinā) (1973). A critical translation-commentary and analysis of the fundamental arguments in Avicenna's Metaphysica in the Dānish̲̲ Nāma-i alā'ī (The Book of scientific knowledge). By Parviz Morewedge.
- Avicenna's Commentary on the Poetics of Aristotle (1974). A critical study with an annotated translation of the text by Ismail Dahiyat.
- Remarks and admonitions (1984). A translation of Al-Isharat wa'l-tanbihat from the original Arabic with an introduction and notes by Shams Constantine Inati.
- Persian works of Avicenna.

== Source material ==
The sources used to identify relevant translations include the following.

- A general collection of the best and most interesting voyages and travels in all parts of the world
- American journal of Semitic languages and literatures
- American oriental series
- Annals of medical history
- Ante-Nicene Christian library
- Archaeologia aeliana, or, Miscellaneous tracts relating to antiquities
- Biblioteca sacra
- Bulletin of the John Rylands Library
- Byzantinische Zeitschrift
- Church historians of England
- Columbia University oriental studies
- Dallas Medieval Texts and Translations
- Der Islam
- Drama from the Middle Ages to the Early Twentieth Century: An Anthology of Plays with Old Spelling
- Early English Text Society
- Early Sources of Scottish History, A.D. 500 to 1286
- Encyclopædia Romana
- English Historical Review
- Ériu
- The expositor
- Folklore
- Fraser's magazine
- E. J. W. Gibb memorial series
- Gnostic Society Library
- Hakluyt Society publications
- History of India, as Told by its Own Historians
- Indian antiquary
- Irish Ecclesiastical Record
- Irish Texts Society
- Isis: International review devoted to the history and science of civilization
- Irisleabhar na Gaedhilge: Gaelic journal.
- Islamica
- Islandica: an annual relating to Iceland and the Fiske Icelandic collection in Cornell University Library
- Janus
- Jewish Quarterly Review
- Journal of sacred literature
- Journal of theological studies
- Journal of the American Oriental Society
- Journal of the Bombay Branch of the Royal Asiatic Society
- Journal of the Royal Asiatic Society of Great Britain and Ireland
- Journal of the Society of oriental research
- Journal of philology
- Journal of the Royal Asiatic Society
- Journal of the Royal Society of Antiquaries of Ireland
- Kerry archaeological magazine
- Le muséon
- Letters of wit, politicks and morality
- Library of fathers of the holy Catholic church.
- Macdonald Presentation Volume
- Mathematics Genealogy Project
- Medieval narrative: a book of translations
- Miscellany of the Irish Archaeological Society
- New medieval library
- Palestine Pilgrims' Text Society (PPTS), Library of.
- Patrologia Graecae
- Patrologia Orientalis
- Poet lore
- Proceedings of the Literary and Philosophical Society of Liverpool
- Rerum Britannicarum medii ævi scriptores: or, Chronicles and memorials of Great Britain and Ireland during the Middle Ages (Rolls Series)
- Revue celtique
- Sacred books and early literature of the East
- Select Bibliography of Publications Mainly in English, in The Routledge Companion to the Crusades by Peter Lock
- Select library of Nicene and post-Nicene fathers of the Christian church, Second series (Wikisource library).
- Selections from the Hengwrt manuscripts preserved in the Peniarth library
- Silva gadelica (I–XXXI), edited by Standish Hayes O'Grady (1832–1915).
- Six old English chronicles
- Speculum: A Journal of Medieval Studies
- Studia sinaitica
- Source Collections in Translation, Dartmouth University
- Studies in Islamic mysticism
- Studies in Islamic poetry
- Texts and studies, contributions to Biblical and patristic literature (1891–1902). by Joseph Armitage Robinson (1858–1933)
- The Johns Hopkins Studies in Romance Literatures and Languages
- The Month
- Transactions of the Honourable Society of Cymmrodorion
- Trübner's oriental series
- University of Washington, Publications in the social sciences
- Western Reserve University Bulletin
- Wisdom of the East series
- Woodbrooke Studies: Christian Documents in Syriac, Arabic, and Garshūni
- Writings of the early Christians of the 2nd century
- Yale Studies in English
- Y Cymmrodor

== See also ==
- Annals
- Arabic literature
- Armenian literature
- Chronicles
- Garshuni
- Hagiography
- History of Astronomy
- Islamic literature
- Medieval literature
- Medieval theatre
- Miracle play
- Mystery play
- New Testament apocrypha
- Persian literature
- Syriac literature
