= James Aylward =

James Aylward may refer to:

- James Aylward (cricketer) (1741–1827), English cricketer
- James Aylward (politician) (born 1964), Canadian politician
- James P. Aylward (1885–1982), Missouri attorney and Democratic party leader
- James Ambrose Dominic Aylward (1813–1872), English Catholic theologian and poet
