= Archelaus (bishop of Carrhae) =

3rd century Bishop of Carrhae

Archelaus (Ancient Greek: Ἀρχέλαος) was the bishop of Carrhae.

In 278 AD, he held a public dispute with a number of Manichaeans -- that is, followers of Mani -- an account of which he published in Syriac. The work was soon translated both into Greek and into Latin.: The acts of disputation of Archelaus, bishop of Cashar in Mesopotamia, with the heresiarch Manes (1871). Translated by Scottish educator Stewart Dingwall Fordyce Salmond (1838–1905). In the Ante-Nicene Christian library, Volume VI–Fathers of the Third Century (see also works related to Ante-Nicene Fathers at Wikisource). For a long time, the Acts functioned as an essential source for Mani's life and Manichaeism. In the first half of the 18th century their authenticity was refuted by Isaac de Beausobre.

A large fragment of the Latin version was published by Henri Valois in his edition of Socrates and Sozomen. The same version, almost entire, was again printed, with the fragments of the Greek version, by Zaccagni in his Collect. Monument. Vet., Rom. 1698, and by German classical scholar Johann Albert Fabricius in his edition of Hippolytus of Rome.
