= William Maunsell Hennessy =

Irish official and scholar

William Maunsell Hennessy (1829–1889) was an Irish official and scholar.

== Life ==
Hennessy was born at Castle Gregory, County Kerry. After school education he emigrated to the United States, where he lived for some years. He returned to Ireland and wrote in newspapers, but concentrated on Irish literature: he was a native speaker. In 1868 he obtained an appointment in the Public Record Office, Dublin. He rose to be the assistant-deputy-keeper, and held office till his death.

Losing his wife and a married daughter, Hennessy suffered from depression. He died in Dublin on 13 January 1889.

== Works ==
Hennessy's major works were editions of Irish texts with introductions and translations. He published in 1866 (Rolls Series) the Chronicon Scotorum of Dubhaltach Mac Fhirbhisigh, a summary of Irish history up to 1150, with a glossary. In 1871 he edited, in two volumes of Irish text and translation, The Annals of Loch Cé, an Irish chronicle, 1014–1590. In 1875, he revised and annotated an edition of The Book of Fenagh, the house-book of St. Caillin's Abbey, County Leitrim; and in 1887 one volume of the Annals of Ulster, carrying the chronicle up to 1056. He translated the Tripartite Life of St Patrick (1871); revised the Pedigree of the White Knight (1856); edited the text of the Poets and Poetry of Munster (Dublin, 1883); translated and added a tract on Cath Cnucha from Leabhar na h-Uidhre, and Mac Conglinne's Dream from Leabhar Breac.

Elected Todd professor at the Royal Irish Academy 1882–4, Hennessy prepared a text and translation of Mesca Ulad, the drunkenness of the Ulstermen, which was published in 1889, immediately after his death; he left another old tale, Bruiden Dáderga, in proof. He wrote an article in La Revue Celtique on the ancient Irish goddess of war, and essays on Ossian and Ossianic literature in The Academy (1 and 15 August 1871). He left with other manuscripts an edition of Edward O'Reilly's Irish Dictionary with additions.

== Bibliography ==
- Atkinson, R.; Hancock, W. Neilson; Hennessy, W. M.; O'Curry, Eugene; O'Donovan, John; O'Mahony, Thaddeus; Richey, A. G. (1865). Ancient laws of Ireland. Ireland and Ireland. Commissioners for Publishing the Ancient Laws and Institutes of Ireland. A. Thom, Longman, Green, Longman, Roberts, and Green (Printed for H.M.S.O.).
- Hennessy, W. M. (1866). Chronicum Scotorum : a chronicle of Irish affairs, from the earliest times to A.D. 1135 : with a supplement, containing the events from 1141 to 1150. Longmans, Green.
- Hennessy, W. M. (1866). Chronicum Scotorum : a chronicle of Irish affairs, from the earliest times to A.D. 1135 : with a supplement, containing the events from 1141 to 1150. Rerum Britannicarum Medii Ævi scriptores, or, Chronicles and memorials of Great Britain and Ireland during the Middle Ages. Longmans, Green, Reader, and Dyer.
- Hennessy, W. M. (1866). "On the Curragh of Kildare". Proceedings of the Royal Irish Academy. 9: 343–355. JSTOR 20488923.
- Hennessy, W. M. (1871). The annals of Loch Cé : a chronicle of Irish affairs from A.D. 1014 to A.D. 1590. Rerum Britannicarum Medii Ævi scriptores, or, Chronicles and memorials of Great Britain and Ireland during the Middle Ages. Longman.

- Hennessy, W. M. (1964). Chronicum Scotorum : a chronicle of Irish affairs, from the earliest times to A.D. 1135 : with a supplement, containing the events from 1141 to 1150. Rerum Britannicarum Medii Ævi scriptores, or, Chronicles and memorials of Great Britain and Ireland during the Middle Ages. Kraus Reprint.
- Hennessy, W. M. (1965). The Annals of Loch Cé : a chronicle of Irish affairs from A.D. 1014 to A.D. 1590. Rerum Britannicarum Medii Ævi scriptores, or, Chronicles and memorials of Great Britain and Ireland during the Middle Ages. Kraus Reprint.

- Ó Muráıle, Nollaig; Hennessy, W. M. (William Maunsell) (1998). Annála Uladh = Annals of Ulster : from the earliest times to the year 1541 (2 ed.). Edmund Burke.
