= Oswald Cockayne =

English churchman and philologist (1807–1873)

Thomas Oswald Cockayne (1807–1873) was a churchman and philologist, best known today for his monumental edition of Old English medical texts.

== Life ==
Cockayne took a degree at St. John's College, Cambridge, graduating in mathematics in 1828 as tenth wrangler. He later took holy orders, alongside working for many years an assistant-master in King's College School, London (until 1869). He was a member of the Philological and the Early English Text Societies.

== Works ==
Cockayne's principal works were:

- The Civil History of the Jews, from Joshua to Hadrian ... (1841)
- A Greek Syntax (1846)
- Outlines of the History of France (1846)
- Outlines of the History of Ireland (1851)
- Life of Marshal Turenne (1853)
- Leechdoms Wortcunning, and Starcraft of Early England Being a Collection of Documents, for the Most Part Never Before Printed Illustrating the History of Science in this Country Before the Norman Conquest, Rerum Britannicarum Medii Ævi Scriptores (Rolls Series), 35, 3 vols (London: Longman and others, 1864–6): vol. I, vol. II, vol. III.
- Spoon and Sparrow, or English roots in Greek, Latin, and Hebrew (London: Parker, son, and Bourn, 1861)
- The Shrine, a collection of papers on dry subjects (1864)
