= Richard Butler (Irish priest) =

Anglican priest in Ireland

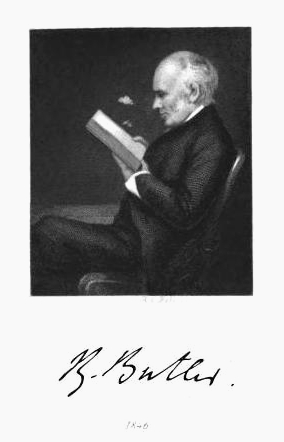
- Richard Butler, seated portrait reading
- Born: c.1796
- Died: 1862
- Occupation: Anglican priest
- Known for: Irish history
- Title: Reverend

Richard Butler (1795/6–1862) was a Church of Ireland priest during the 19th century.

Butler was born in County Meath, the son of Richard Butler of Granard. He was educated at Trinity College, Dublin. He matriculated at Balliol College, Oxford in 1813, aged 17, and graduated B.A. there in 1817. He was vicar of Trim, and Dean of Clonmacnoise from 1847. He married Harriet Edgeworth (1801–1889), sister of Maria Edgeworth.

== Works ==
- Annalium Hiberniæ chronicon, ad annum MCCCXLIX (1849), John Clyn and Thady Dowling, ed. Richard Butler
