= Duncan Black MacDonald =

American orientalist (1863-1943)

Duncan Black MacDonald (1863-1943) was an American orientalist, who was a "pioneer of Arabic and Islamic studies in the United States". He was praised by Hamza Yusuf as a "great Islamic scholar".

He studied Semitic languages at Glasgow and then Berlin, before teaching at the Hartford Theological Seminary in the United States starting in 1893, founding the first school in the U.S. devoted to Christian missionary work among the Muslims of the Middle East.

Letter by MacDonald to Snouck Hurgronje (1919)

His main scholarly interest was Muslim theology, which led him to the study of the One Thousand and One Nights, as he believed that the Nights stories reflected the Muslim popular piety.

MacDonald was the second Western scholar to investigate the manuscripts of the Nights, after Hermann Zotenberg, and he began to publish his results in 1908.He did successfully prove that the ‘Tunisian MSS’ which Maximilian Habicht claimed to find and use for his Breslau Nights edition was a fake, and shown that it was a composite of genuine Nights's manuscripts and various folktale material copied by Habicht's friend Ibn Najjar. MacDonald worked in the classification of the Manuscripts and elaborated a theory of the origin and evolution of the work. The Arabic MSS of Ali Baba he discovered at the Bodleian Library was later found to be counterfeited. MacDonald planned to prepare a critical edition of the only extensively surviving medieval manuscript of the Nights, the three-volume Galland Manuscript. However, nothing came out of it, and this critical edition was produced by Muhsin Mahdi (with reference to MacDonald's notes) only in 1984.

MacDonald also did important work on Arab magic and superstition, and Muslim-Christian relations. The Macdonald Center for the Study of Islam and Christian-Muslim Relations at the Hartford Theological Seminary is named after him.

== Bibliography ==
- Duncan Black MacDonald, ‘“Ali Baba and the forty thieves” in Arabic from a Bodleian MS’, Journal of the Royal Asiatic Society (April 1910): 327-386.
