= Stewart Salmond =

Scottish educator

Stewart Dingwall Fordyce Salmond (1838 in Aberdeen – 20 April 1905) was a Scottish educator, writer and editor.

He was educated at the university and Free Church College, Aberdeen, and at Erlangen University, and was assistant professor of Greek and examiner in classics at Aberdeen University from 1861 until 1867. In 1876 he became professor of systematic theology and exegesis of the Epistles in the Free Church College, Aberdeen, and he was made principal of the college in 1898.

== Works ==
His original works include:

- "Commentary on the Epistle of Peter," in Schaff's Popular Commentary (1883)
- "Commentary on the Epistle of Jude," in Pulpit Commentary (1889)
- The Christian Doctrine of Immortality (1895)

He edited the Bible Class Primers Series for the T. & T. Clark publishing firm.

He also prepared translations of many of the Latin writers:

- St Augustine, De catechizandis rudibus (On the catechizing of the uninstructed), Concerning Faith and Things Unseen
