= James Ambrose Dominic Aylward =

English Catholic theologian and poet

James Ambrose Dominic Aylward OP (4 April 1813 – 5 October 1872) was an English Catholic theologian and poet.

== Biography ==
Born at Leeds, Yorkshire, on 4 April 1813, Aylward was educated at the Dominican priory of Hinckley, entered the Order of St Dominic, was ordained priest in 1836, became Provincial in 1850, first Prior of Woodchester in 1854, and provincial a second time in 1866.

He died, aged 59, at Hinckley, Leicestershire, on 5 October 1872.

== Works ==
Aylward composed several pious manuals for the use of his community and A Novena for the Holy Season of Advent gathered from the prophecies, anthems, etc., of the Roman Missal and Breviary (Derby, 1849). He re-edited a Life of Blessed Virgin St Catherine of Sienna (London, 1867), translated from the Italian by the Dominican John Fenn (Louvain, 1609), and an English translation of Bernard Chocarne's Inner Life of Lacordaire (Dublin, 1867). He died at Hinckley, on 5 October 1872. His essays On the Mystical Elements in Religion, and on Old and Modern Spiritism were edited posthumously by Cardinal Manning (London, 1874).

Aylward's principal monument is his translation of Latin hymns, most of which he contributed to The Catholic Weekly Instructor. In his Annus Sanctus (London, 1884), Orbey Shipley has reprinted many of them. He says of Aylward that he was "a cultivated and talented priest of varied powers and gifts."

His English translation of the Corpus Christi sequence (beginning "Sing forth") was published in Annus Sanctus, pages 194–196. The end of it appears in the English translation of the 2003 Encyclical by Pope John Paul II, Ecclesia De Eucharistia, n. 62. It is also used in the Lectionary in Australia.
