= List of English translations from medieval sources: C =

The list of English translations from medieval sources: C provides an overview of notable medieval documents—historical, scientific, ecclesiastical and literature—that have been translated into English. This includes the original author, translator(s) and the translated document. Translations are from Old and Middle English, Old Irish, Scottish Gaelic, Cornish, Old French, Old Norse, Latin, Arabic, Greek, Persian, Syriac, Ethiopic, Coptic, Armenian, and Hebrew, and most works cited are generally available in the University of Michigan's HathiTrust digital library and OCLC's WorldCat. Anonymous works are presented by topic.

== List of English translations ==
=== CA–CE ===
Cà da Mosto, Alvise. Alvise Cà da Mosto (Cadamosto) (c. 1432 – 1488) was a Venetian slave trader and explorer, who was hired by Henry the Navigator to journey to West Africa. He is credited with the discovery of the Cape Verde Islands and the points along the Guinea coast.

- The voyages of Cada Mosto (1745). In A new general collection of voyages and travels (1745). Consisting of the most esteemed relations which have been hitherto published in any language, comprehending everything remarkable in its kind in Europe, Asia, Africa, and America. Edited by John Green (fl. 1730–1753), published by Thomas Astley (died 1759).
- Original journals of the voyages of Cada Mosto and Piedro de Cintra to the coast of Africa, the former in the years 1455 and 1456 and the latter soon afterwards (1811). In A general history and collection of voyages and travels to the end of the eighteenth century (1811), Volume II, pp. 200–262. By Scottish writer and translator Robert Kerr (1757–1813).
- The voyages of Cadamosto and other documents on Western Africa in the second half of the fifteenth century (1937). Edited and translated by Gerald Roe Crone. Issued by the Hakluyt Society, Second series, Volume 80.

Cabasilas, Nilus. Nilus Cabasilas, known as Neilos Kabasilas (died after 1361), was a Palamite theologian who was Metropolitan of Thessalonica, succeeding Gregory Palamas.

- A briefe treatise, conteynynge a playne and fruitfull declaration of the Popes vsurped primacye, written in Greeke aboue. vij. hundred yeres sens (1560). Translated by Thomas Gressop.

Cædmon poems. The poems of Cædmon (fl. c. 657 – 684), the earliest English poet whose name is known. He was a zealous monk and an accomplished and inspirational Christian poet, with Cædmon's Hymn being the only surviving composition that can be definitely be ascribed to him. Cædmon is one of twelve Anglo-Saxon poets identified in mediaeval sources, and one of only three of these for whom contemporary biographical information and examples of literary output have survived (the other two being Alfred the Great and Bede). His story is related in the Historia ecclesiastica gentis Anglorum by Bede. Several of Cædmon's later works are found in the Junius manuscript (Junius ms. 11) sometimes referred to as the Caedmon ms.

- Cædmon's metrical paraphrase of parts of the Holy Scriptures, in Anglo-Saxon (1832). With an English translation, notes, and a verbal index, by English scholar Benjamin Thorpe (1782–1870). Based on the text of the original Junius ms. 11 in the Bodleian Library, containing the Anglo-Saxon poems Genesis, Exodus, Daniel, and Christ and Satan. The song of Azariah, from the Exeter ms. Published by the Society of Antiquaries of London.
- The Cædmon poems (1916). Translated into English prose by Charles William Kennedy (1882–1969). With an introduction, and facsimiles of the illustrations in the Junius ms. Includes Caedmon's Hymn and the Anglo-Saxon poems Genesis, Exodus, Daniel, and Christ and Satan.
- Genesis A (1915). Translated from the Old English by Lawrence Mason (1882–1939). In Yale Studies in English, Volume 48.
- The fall of man: or paradise lost of Cædmon (1860). Translated in verse from the Anglo-Saxon, with a new metrical arrangement of the lines of part of the original text, and an introduction on the versification of Cædmon, by William H. F. Bosanquet.
- The opening of Cædmon's paraphrase, translated into modern English. In Clement Marot, and other studies (1871), Volume II, pp. 297–306. By English academic Henry Morley (1822–1894).
- The fall of man, translated from the Anglo-Saxon of Cædmon (1896). In The epic of the fall of man: a comparative study of Caedmon, Dante and Milton (1896). By Stephen Humphreys Villiers Gurteen (1840–1898). Includes a biographical sketch of Cædmon and the Junius ms. and a translation of the Old English poem Genesis here ascribed to Cædmon.
- Translation of the Old English Exodus (1903). By William Savage Johnson (1877–1942). In the Journal of English and Germanic philology, V (1903–1905), pp. 44–57.
- The Holy Rood, a dream (1866). A translation of the poem Dream of the Rood, once attributed to Cædmon or Cynewulf, by English archeologist and philologist George Stephens (1813–1895). In The Ruthwell cross, Northumbria (1866).

Caesarius of Heisterbach. Caesarius of Heisterbach (c. 1180 – c. 1240) was the prior of the Cistercian monastery of Heisterbach Abbey.

- The Dialogue on Miracles (1929). Translated by Henry von Essen Scott and C. C. Swinton Bland.
- Medieval heresies: Of the Waldensian heresy in the city of Metz, Of the heresy of the Albigenses; Of the heretics burned at Paris. From the Dialogue on Miracles.
- Cistercian legends of the thirteenth century (1872). Translated from the Latin by Henry Collins.

Cáin Adamnáin. Cáin Adamnáin: an Old-Irish treatise on the law of Adamnan (1905). An edition of Cáin Adamnáin translated by German Celtic scholar Kuno Meyer (1858–1919). See Adamnan, in List of English translations: A.

Cáin Domnaig. A tract in the Yellow Book of Lecan known as the Law of Sunday. It consists of three parts: (1)the Epistle of Jesus on the observance of Sunday; (2) three examples of punishment for violation of Sunday; and (3) the Cáin Domnaig proper, a highly technical law tract.

- Cáin Domnaig, translated by James George O'Keeffe (1865–1937). In Ériu, II (1905), pp. 189–214.
- The law of the Lord's day in the Celtic church (1926). By Donald Maclean (1869–1943).

Caithreim Cellachain Caisil. An Irish saga about Cellachán mac Buadacháin (Cellachán Caisil) (died 954), king of Munster.

- Caithreim Cellachain Caisil (1905). The victorious career of Cellachan of Cashel, or The wars between the Irishmen and the Norsemen in the middle of the 10th century. The original Irish text edited and with a translation and notes by Norwegian historian Alexander Bugge (1870–1929). Chiefly based on one manuscript of the Book of Lismore, a vellum ms. from the end of the 15th century belonging to the Duke of Devonshire. Published for Det Norske historiske kildeskriftfond.

Caithreim Conghail Clairinghnigh. The book of the martial career of the legendary Congal Cláiringnech (2nd century BC), son of Rudraige, and king of Ulster and High King of Ireland.

- Caithreim Conghail Clairinghnigh: Martial career of Conghal Cláiringhneach (1904). Edited for the first time, with translation, introduction, notes, and glossary, by Patrick M. MacSweeney. Irish Texts Society, 5.

Campanton, Judah ben Solomon. Judah ben Solomon Canpanton (fl. 1130) was a Jewish ethical writer and philosopher.

- Judah ben Solomon Campanton and his Arbaʻah ḳinyanim (1930). By Elhanan Hirsh Golomb (born 1887).

Cancy, Sir Joseph de. Sir Joseph de Cancy (Chauncy) (c. 1213 – c. 1283) was prior of the English Hospitallers. Following the Second Battle of Homs in 1281, Joseph wrote to Edward I of England concerning the activities of Hugh I of Jerusalem and Bohemond VII of Antioch.

- Letter from Sir Joseph de Cancy, knight of the Hospital of St. John of Jerusalem, to King Edward I. (1281), and Letter from King Edward I, to Sir Joseph (1282) (1888). Edited by William Basevi Sanders (died 1892). In the library of Palestine Pilgrims' Text Society (PPTS), Volume V, Part 5.

Cantalupus, Nicolaus. Nicolaus Cantalupus, or Cantilowe, (died 1441) was an English Carmelite at Bristol, prior of his order. He wrote his Historica Universitatis Cantabrigiensis (1719) and other ecclesiastical works.

- The history and antiquities of the University of Cambridge (1721). In two parts. (1) Of Its original and progress in the remoter ages, written above 300 years ago by Nicholas Cantalupe. (2) A description of the present colleges. By the Rev. Mr. Richard Parker. To which are added several charters granted to the colleges. Lastly, a catalogue of the chancellors and a summary of all the privileges granted to this seminary of learning by the English monarchs.

Canterbury Cathedral. Canterbury Cathedral, one of the oldest and most famous Christian structures in England, was founded in 597 and rebuilt between 1070 and 1077.

- The antiquities of Canterbury (1703). In two parts: (1) The antiquities of Canterbury; or a survey of that ancient city, with the suburbs and cathedral; (2) Cantuaria Sacra, or the antiquities [of the various buildings]. Sought out and published by the industry and good will of English antiquarian William Somner (1598–1669), author of the first dictionary of the Anglo-Saxon language. Edited and revised by English clergyman and antiquary Nicholas Batteley (1648–1704).
- The most accurate history of the ancient city, and famous cathedral of Canterbury (1661). By W. Somner. Being an exact description of all the rarities in that city, suburbs, and cathedral. Together, with the lives of all the archbishops of that see, illustrated with [diverse] maps and figures. Edited by Hugh Cecil Lowther, Earl of Lonsdale (1857–1944).
- Heraldic notices of Canterbury Cathedral (1827). With genealogical and topographical notes, to which is added a chronological list of the Archbishops of Canterbury, with the blazon of their respective arms. By English heraldic author and stained glass artist Thomas Willement (1786–1871).
- A monastic chronicle lately discovered at Christ church, Canterbury. Edited and translated by Charles Eveleigh Woodruff (1856–1948). In Archaeologia cantiana, XXIX (1911), pp. 47–84.

Caoursin, Guillaume. Guillaume (Gulielmus) Caoursin (1430–1501) was vice-chancellor of the Knights Hospitaller. He was an eye-witness to the siege of Rhodes in 1480, an unsuccessful attack by the Ottoman fleet as documented in his Obsidionis Rhodiæ urbis descriptio (1480). His work appears (in French) in the Recueil des historiens des croisades (RHC), Historiens occidentaux, Volume 5. (cf. French Wikipedia, Gulielmus Caoursin)

- Caoursin's account of the siege of Rhodes (1869). English translation of Obsidionis Rhodiæ urbis descriptio by English poet John Caius (fl. 1480). Reprinted in Edward Gibbon's The Crusades, excerpted from his History of the Decline and Fall of the Roman Empire. Full title: The Delectable Newwesse and Tithynges of the Glorious Victory of the Rhodyans against the Turkes.

Capgrave, John. John Capgrave (1393–1464) was an English historian, hagiographer and theologian. He was known for his Nova Legenda Angliae (New Reading from England), the first comprehensive collection of lives of the English saints, and Abbreuiacion of Cronicles. A biography and complete bibliography is found in the introduction of Hingeston's edition.

- John Capgrave's lives of St. Augustine and St. Gilbert of Sempringham, and a sermon (1910). Edited by John James Munro. In Early English Text Society, Original series, Volume 140. An edition of Lives of St. Augustine (1893) by Carl Horstmann is in Volume 100.
- Nova legenda Anglie (1901). As collected by John of Tynemouth (14th century), John Capgrave, and others, and first printed, with new lives, by Wynkyn de Worde, AD MDXVI. Now re-edited with fresh material from manuscripts and printed sources by C. Horstmann.
- The book of the illustrious Henries (1858). Translated from the Latin by English antiquary, the Rev. Francis Charles Hingeston.
- The chronicle of England (1858). A chronology of history from the time of Adam until 1416. Edited by F. C. Hingeston. Published by the authority of the lords commissioners of Her Majesty's Treasury, under the direction of the Master of the Rolls. Also known as Abbreuiacion of Cronicles (1983), translated by Peter J. Lucas, in Early English Text Society, Original series, Volume 285.

Cardan, Gerolamo. Gerolamo Cardan (1501–1576) was an Italian polymath whose areas of interest included mathematics and astrology.

- The book of my life (De vita propria liber) (1931). By [Jerome] Cardan and translated from the Latin by Jean Stoner.
- Anima astrologiæ; or, A guide for astrologers (1886). Being the one hundred and forty-six considerations of the famous astrologer, Guido Bonatus, translated from the Latin by astrologer and mathematician Henry Coley (1633–1704), together with the choicest aphorisms of the seven segments of Gerolamo Cardan of Milan, edited by astrologer William Lilly (1602–1681) in 1675. Republished from the original edition with notes and a preface by William Charles Eldon Serjeant.
- Cardano: the gambling scholar (1965). By Øystein Ore (1899-1968). With a translation from the Latin of Cardano's Book on games of chance by Sidney Henry Gould.

Carlaverock, siege of. The siege of Carlaverock (1300), part of the Wars of Scottish Independence, occurred when Edward I of England marched north with an army including eighty-seven of the barons of England and several knights of Brittany and Lorraine, and besieged Carlaverock (Caerlaverock) Castle.

- The siege of Karlaverock in Scotland (1779). In the Antiquarian repertory, Volume II (1779), pp. 107–passim.
- The siege of Carlaverock in the xxviii Edward I. A.D. MCCC (1828). With the arms of the earls, barons, and knights, who were present on the occasion; with a translation, a history of the castle, and memoirs of the personages commemorated by the poet. Presumed author Walter of Exeter (1261–1326), translated by English antiquary Nicholas Harris Nicolas (1799–1848).
- The Roll of Arms of the Princes, Barons, and Knights who Attended King Edward I to the Siege of Caerlaverock, in 1300 (1864). Anonymous author, translated by English antiquarian and writer Thomas Wright (1810–1877). In Wikisource, The Roll of Caerlaverock.

Carman, Fair of. The Fair of Carman, also known as the Óenach Carmán, was a pagan festival (Óenach) of Leinster honoring the warrior-sorceress Carman of Celtic mythology, typically held by a new king to ensure a successful reign.

- Aenach Carman: Its Site (1906). By Irish historian Goddard Henry Orpen (1852–1932). In the Journal of the Royal Society of Antiquaries of Ireland, 36(1), fifth series, pp. 11–41.
- The ancient fair of Carman (1873). In On the manners and customs of the ancient Irish (1873), by Irish philologist and antiquary Eugene O'Curry (1796–1862). Edited with an introduction, appendixes, etc., by William Kirby Sullivan (1821–1890).

Carmen de proditione Guenonis. One of the oldest forms of the chanson de Roland.

- The Carmen de Prodicione Guenonis (1911). Translated into English with textual notes by Arthur A. Livingston (1883–1944). In Romanic review, Volume II, pp. 61–79.

Carthach. Saint Carthach (the Younger), known as Mo Chutu mac Fínaill (died 639), was first abbot of Lismore. See Lectures on the manuscript materials of ancient Irish history (1861), by Irish philologist and antiquary Eugene O'Curry (1796–1862).

- The rule of St. Carthach. In the Irish Ecclesiastical Record, Volume I (1864–1865), pp. 113–118, 172–180. From the manuscripts of E. O'Curry. Another translation is in ibid, Volume XXVII (1910), pp. 495–517.
- Life of St. Declan of Ardmore and Life of St. Mochuda of Lismore (1914). Edited from the manuscripts in the Bibliothèque royale, Brussels, and in the Library of Royal Irish academy. With introduction, translation, and notes, by Rev. Patrick Power (1862–1951). From the introduction: "The life [of St. Declan] herewith presented was copied in 1629 by Brother Michael O'Clery [Mícheál Ó Cléirigh (c. 1590 – 1643), chief author of the Annals of the Four Masters]... from an older ms. of Eochy O'Heffernan's [Eochaidh Ui Ifernain] dated 1582 ... Apparently O'Clery did more than transcribe; he reedited, as was his wont, into the literary Irish of his day ... The "Life [of St. Mochuda or Carthach] ... is in its present form a comparatively late production; it was transcribed by [John] Murphy between 1740 and 1750." Irish Texts Society, 16.

Casola, Pietro. Pietro Casola (1427–1507) was a Catholic canon who took a journey to Jerusalem in 1494, documenting his travels in a journal.

- Canon Pietro Casola's pilgrimage to Jerusalem in the year 1494 (1907). English translation with introduction and notes by Mary Margaret Newett. Italian original first published in 1855, under title Viaggio a Gerusalemme verso la fine del 1400.

Cassianus, Joannes. Joannes Cassianus, known now as John Cassian or John the Ascetic (c. 360 – c. 435), was a Christian monk and theologian celebrated in both the Western and Eastern churches for his mystical writings.

- The works of John Cassian (1894). Translated by the Rev. Edgar C. S. Gibson (1848–1924). In A select library of Nicene and Post-Nicene Fathers, Series II, Volume XI (Wikisource library).
- The twelve books of John Cassian on the Institutes of the Coenobia, and the Remedies for the eight principal faults.

Cassiodorus. Magnus Aurelius Cassiodorus Senator (c. 485 – c. 585) was a Roman statesman, renowned scholar of antiquity, and writer serving in the administration of Theodoric the Great.

- The letters of Cassiodorus (1886). Being a condensed translation of the Variae epistolae of Magnus Aurelius Cassiodorus Senator. Translated with an introduction by British historian and biographer Thomas Hodgkin (1831–1913).

Castro, Philip de. Philip de Castro (fl. 1289) was a steward and "person of rank" during the reign of Edward I of England.

- Traveling expense in the thirteenth century (1827). The accounts of Philip de Castro of the daily expense of a person of rank in the reign of King Edward I on a journey from Oxford to Canterbury, and during his sojourn in London, about AD 1289. Transcribed by the Rev. Joseph Hunter (1783–1861). In Retrospective review, and historical and antiquarian magazine, Second series, Volume I (1827), pp. 269–276, 465–469.

Castiglione, Baldassare. Baldassare Castiglione (1478–1529), count of Casatico, was an Italian courtier, diplomat, soldier and a prominent Renaissance author. His principal work was Castiglione wrote The Book of the Courtier (Il Cortegiano), a courtesy book dealing with questions of the etiquette and morality of the courtier.

- The book of the courtier (1903). By Count Baldesar Castiglione (1528). Translated from the Italian by Leonard Eckstein Opdycke (1858–1914), with twelve portraits and fifteen autographs.
- Courts and camps of the Italian renaissance (1908). Being a mirror of the life and times of the ideal gentleman Count Baldassare Castiglione derived largely from his own letters and other contemporary sources, to which is added an epitome of his famous work The book of the courtier. With appreciations and annotations by Christopher Hare, pseudonym for Marian Andrews (1839–1929).

Caterina da Bologna. Saint Caterina da Bologna, also known as Catherine of Bologna, (1413–1463), was an Italian Poor Clare nun, writer, teacher, mystic, artist, and saint.

- The spiritual armour of St. Catherine of Bologna together with the Way of the Cross by Blessed Angela of Foligno (1926). Translated by Alan Gordon McDougall (1895–1964) from the Italian work La via della crose (1919), edited by Guido Battelli.

Caterina da Genova. Saint Caterina da Genova, also known as Catherine of Genoa, (1447–1510), was an Italian Roman Catholic saint and mystic, known for various writings describing her work with the poor and her mystical experiences.

- Treatise on purgatory (1858). Translated from the original Italian, with a preface by Cardinal Henry Edward Manning (1808–1892).
- Purgation and purgatory: the spiritual dialogue (1979). Translation and notes by Serge Hughes, introduction by Benedict Joseph Groeschel (1933–2014), and preface by Catherine de Hueck Doherty (1896–1985).

Caterina da Siena. Saint Caterina da Siena, also known as Catherine of Siena, (1347–1380), was a lay member of the Dominican Order, and a mystic, activist, and author. Her major work is The Dialogue of Divine Providence (1388).

- The Orcherd of Syon (1966). Edited by Phyllis Hodgson and Gabriel M Liegey. A Middle English translation of the Dialogo from the early fifteenth century, first printed in 1519. In Early English Text Society, Originalseries, Volume 257.
- Saint Catherine of Siena as seen in her letters (1905). Translated and edited with introduction by Julia Vida Dutton Scudder (1861–1954).
- The dialogue of the seraphic virgin, Catherine of Siena, dictated by her, while in a state of ecstasy, to her secretaries and completed in the year of our Lord 1370 (1907). Translated from the original Italian, and preceded by an introduction on the life and times of the saint by Algar Labouchere Thorold (1866–1936).

Cath Catharde. In Cath Catharda, or, the Civil War of the Romans (1909). Translated and edited by Celtic scholar Whitley Stokes (1830–1909). In Irische Texte mit Wörterbuch, Volume IV, Part 2. The work is one of the longest prose compositions in medieval Irish. It is a free adaptation of Books I–VII of the epic poem Pharsalia, by 1st-century Roman poet Lucan (Marcus Annaeus Lucanus).

Cath Flochairte Brighte. An account of the battle of Fochart (or Faughart, the birthplace of St. Brigid of Kildare), fought in 1318.

- Cath Flochairte Brighte, or the battle of Fochart of St. Bridget. An Irish account of Bruce's invasion edited and translated by Henry Morris (1874–1945), known as Énri Ua Muirgheasa. In the Journal of the Journal of the County Louth Archaeological Society, Volume I (1904–1907), Part III, pp. 77–91.
- The Gaelic Account of the Bruce Invasion, Cath Fhochairte Brighite: Medieval Romance or Modern Forgery? (1988). By Sean Duffy. In Seanchas Ardmhacha: Journal of the Armagh Diocesan Historical Society, Volume 13(1), pp. 59–121.

Catharina. Saint Catharina of Alexandria, also known as Katherine of Alexandria, (fl. 4th century) was an Egyptian Christian saint and virgin who was martyred at the hands of Roman emperor Maxentius. In the fifteenth century, Joan of Arc identified her as one of the saints who appeared to and counseled her.

- The legend of St. Katherine of Alexandria (1841). Edited, from a manuscript in the Cottonian library, by James Morton.
- Life of St. Katherine (1884). Edited, with introduction, notes and a glossary, by Eugen Einenkel (1853–1930). With its Latin original from the Cotton ms. Caligula A, VIII. In Early English Text Society, Original series, Volume 80.
- The life and martyrdom of Saint Katherine of Alexandria, virgin and martyr (1884). Now first printed from a manuscript of the early part of the fifteenth century in the possession of Henry Hucks Gibbs (1819–1907). With preface, notes, glossary, and an appendix that includes a revision to E. Einenkel's translation above. Roxburghe Club Books, Volume 112.
- The miracles of Madame Saint Katherine of Fierbois (1897). Translated by Scottish poet and anthropologist Andrew Lang (1844–1912) from the edition of the Abbé Jean Jacque Bourassé (1813–1872).

Catonis disticha. The Catonis disticha, also known as Distichs of Cato or simply Cato, (3rd or 4th century), is a Latin collection of proverbial wisdom and morality by an unknown author referred to as Dionysius Cato. It was the most popular medieval schoolbook for teaching Latin and was in common use as a Latin teaching aid as late as the 18th century, used by Benjamin Franklin. Franklin also published Cato's Moral Distichs, later revised and edited by his American biographer Carl van Doren (1885–1950).

- Parvus Cato, Magnus Cato (1906). Translated by Benet Burgh. Printed at Westminster by William Caxton (c. 1422 – c. 1491) about the year 1477.

Cavalcanti, Guido. Guido Cavalcanti (c. 1250 – 1300) was an Italian poet, and a friend and intellectual influence on Dante Alighieri.

- Sonnets and ballate of Guido Cavalcanti (1912). With translations of them, and an introduction, by American poet and critic Ezra Pound (1885–1972).

Caxton, William. William Caxton (c. 1422 – c. 1491) was an English merchant, diplomat, and writer, introducing the printing press into England, in 1476, and the first English retailer of printed books. Caxton's work is heavily represented in the works published by the Early English Text Society, including from the Original Series numbers 168, 176, 189, 234, 263 and 355; from the Extra Series numbers 3, 36, 37, 44, 45, 54, 57, 58, 64, 79, 110 and 111; and Supplemental Series, number 2.

- The recuyell of the historyes of Troye (1894). Written in French by Raoul Lefèvre (fl. 1460). Translated and printed by W. Caxton, The recuyell of the historyes of Troye (1464), was the first English printed book. Edited by Heinrich Oskar Sommer (born 1861).
- Dialogues in French and English (1900). Adapted from a fourteenth-century book of dialogues in French and Flemish. Edited from Caxton's printed text (c. 1483), with introduction, notes, and word lists, by British philologist and lexicographer Henry Bradley (1845–1923). In Early English Text Society, Extra Series, 79.
- The biography and typography of William Caxton, England's first printer (1877). By English printer and bibliographer William Blades (1824–1890).
- William Caxton (1905). By British bibliographer Edward Gordon Duff (1861–1924).
- Fifteenth century English books; a bibliography of books and documents printed in England and of books for the English market printed abroad (1917). by E. Gordon Duff.

Celestinus I. Saint Celestine I (c. 376 – 432) was pope from 422 through 432.

- A homily on the Archangel Gabriel, by Celestinus, archbishop of Rome. In The Coptic manuscripts in the Freer Collection (1923), pp. 128–248 (Coptic), pp. 327–358 (English translation). Edited by William Hoyt Worrell (1879–1952). Authorship uncertain, attributed by Celestinus by W. Worrell. Published in the University of Michigan Studies, Humanistic Series, Volume X (1923), Part 2.

Célie Dé. Célie Dé is the Celtic equivalent of Servus Dei, literally Spouses of God, or Culdees. First used in the Annals of the Four Masters referring to the Dominican Friars of Sligo and in the Book of Fenagh applied to John the Baptist.

- On the Célie-dé, commonly called the Culdees. By the Rev. William Reeves (1815–1892). In the Transactions of the Royal Irish Academy, Antiquities, XXIV (1873), Part 2, pp. 119–263.
- Prose rule of the Célie-dé. Translated by Irish language scholar John O'Donovan (1809–1861). Ibid, pp. 202–215.
- The rule of Célie-dé. In the Rule of Tallaght (1927), edited by Irish scholar Edward Gwynn (1868–1941). In Hermathena, Volume 44 (1927), second supplement.

Cene de la Chitarra. Cene de la Chitarra (Cene of the Guitar) was the pseudonym of an Aretine poet who wrote a parody of the Sonnets of the Months by Italian poet Folgóre da San Gimignano (c. 1270 – c. 1332).

- A translation of Cene de la Chitarra's parodies of the Sonnets of the Months, by Ruth Shepard Phelps (1876–1949). In Romanic review, VI (1915), pp. 283–297.

Cennini, Cennino. Cennino d'Andrea Cennini (c. 1360 – before 1427) was an Italian painter influenced by Giotto di Bondone.

- A treatise on painting (1844). Written by Cennino Cennini in the year 1437, and first published in Italian in 1821, with an introduction and notes, by Giuseppe Tambroni (1773–1824). Containing practical directions for painting in fresco, secco, oil, and distemper, with the art of gilding and illuminating manuscripts adopted by the old Italian masters. Translated by artist and algologist Mary Philadelphia Merrifield (1804–1889). With an introductory preface, copious notes, and illustrations in outline from celebrated pictures.
- The book of the art of Cennino Cennini (1922). A contemporary practical treatise of quattrocento painting translated from the Italian, with notes on medieval art methods, by British artist Lady Christiana Jane Herringham (1852–1929).
- Il libro dell' arte [The craftsman's handbook] (1932). By American art historian and translator Daniel Varney Thompson (1902–1980).

Ceolfrid. Saint Ceolfrid, or Ceolfrith ( c. 642 – 716) was an Anglo-Saxon Christian abbot, best known as the warden of Bede from the age of seven until his death in 716.

- The life of Ceolfrid, abbot of the monastery at Wearmouth and Jarrow (1912). By an unknown author of the eighth century. Translated from the original, and edited (with introductory essay and notes) by Douglas Samuel Boutflower. First publication in English, to which is added an article on the Codex Amiatinus, by the Rev. John L. Low (1817–1888).

Cessolis, Jacobus de. Jacobus de Cessolis (c. 1250 – c. 1322) was an Italian Dominican friar whose sermons on morality were published as Liber de moribus hominum et officiis nobilium super ludo scacchorum (Book of the customs of men and the duties of nobles or the Book of Chess). They later became the basis of a famous author of a morality book The Game and Playe of the Chesse, one of the earliest printed books in English, published by William Caxton in 1474.

- Caxton's Game and playe of the chesse, 1474 (1883). A verbatim reprint of the first edition, with an introduction by English librarian and antiquary William Edward Armytage Axon (1846–1913).

=== CH–CI ===
Chandos the Herald. Chandos the Herald (fl. 1360–1380) was herald (officer of arms) to English knight Sir John Chandos (c. 1320 – 1369), a close friend of Edward the Black Prince and a founding member and 19th Knight of the Order of the Garter in 1348.

- The Black Prince (1842). An historical poem written in French, with a translation and notes by English librarian the Rev. Henry Octavius Coxe (1811–1881). Roxburghe Club Books, Volume 58.
- Le Prince Noir: poéme du héraut d'armes Chandos (1883). English title: The life and feats of arms of Edward the Black prince, Chandos herald. A material chronicle with an English translation and notes by Francisque Michel (1809–1887).
- Life of the Black Prince (1910). By the herald of Sir John Chandos. Edited from the manuscript in Worcester College, with linguistic and historical notes, by Mildred Katherine Pope (1872–1956) and Eleanor Constance Lodge (1869–1936).

Chanson de Roland. La Chanson de Roland (Song of Roland) is an 11th-century chanson de geste based on Frankish military leader Roland (died 778) and the battle of Roncevaux Pass in 778, during the reign of Charlemagne. The author has been postulated to be a poet Turold (Turoldus) who wrote the work sometime between the Norman conquest of England and the First Crusade. Roland, also known as Orlando, is a principal figure in the Matter of France. See also Roland.

- The song of Roland, as chanted before the battle of Hastings (1854). By the minstrel Taillefer. Translated by the author of Emilia Wyndham, Anne Marsh-Caldwell (1791–1874).
- The song of Roland (1880). Translated into English verse by Irish lawyer and writer John O'Hagan (1822–1890).
- The death of Roland. In Gudrun, Beowulf and Roland with other mediaeval tales (1881), pp. 171–227. By John Gibb (1835–1915).
- The death of Roland: an epic poem (1887). By English author and composer John Frederick Rowbotham (1859–1925).
- La chanson de Roland (1885). Translated into English from the seventh edition of La Chanson de Roland(1880) of French literary historian Léon Gautier (1832–1897), by Léonce Rabillon (1814–1886).
- The song of Roland (1904). Translated into English prose by Isabel Butler. From the Riverside literature series.
- The song of Roland (1913). Translated into English verse by Australian classical scholar Arthur Sanders Way(1847-–1930).
- The song of Roland (1920). Done into English, in the original measure, by Scottish writer and translator Charles Kenneth Scott Moncrieff (1889–1930); with an introduction by G. K. Chesterton (1874–1936), and a note on technique by George Saintsbury (1845–1933).
- The song of Roland (1924). Newly translated into English with an introduction by American scholar of medieval French literature Jessie Raven Crosland (1879–1973). In King's classics.
- History of Charles the Great and Orlando (1812). Ascribed to archbishop Turpin, who appears as one of the paladins (twelve peers) of France in the Song of Roland as a warrior-bishop. Translated from the Latin by Thomas Rodd (1763–1822). Reprinted in Mediaeval tales (1884) by Henry Morley (1822–1894).
- The song of Roland: the legend that Turoldus relates (1960). The Oxford version translated into modern English verse by Laura Moore Wright.
- The Carmen de Prodicione Guenonis (1911). Translated into English, with textual notes, by Arthur A. Livingston (1883–1944). In Romanic review, Volume II, pp. 61–79.

Charlemagne. Charlemagne (748–814) was king of the Franks and founder of the Carolingian Empire. Among those listed below are legal, historical or fictional accounts of Charlemagne and his reign. See also Charlemagne Romances, below, which considers the series published by the Early English Text Society.

- Life of Charlemagne (1915). A translation of the Latin biography Vita Karoli Magni by Frankish scholar and courtier Einhard (c. 775 – 840), a servant of Charlemagne's and his son Louis the Pious. Edited, with introductions and notes, by British classical scholars Heathcote William Garrod (1878–1960) and Robert Balmain Mowat (1883–1941).
- Early lives of Charlemagne (1922). Translations of two biographies of Charlemagne: (1) Vita Karoli Magni by Eginhard [Einhard]; and (2) Gesta Caroli Magni by Notker Balbulus, the Monk of Saint Gall. The latter is not really a biography, but rather a collection of anecdotes of Charlemagne and his family. Translated and edited by Arthur James Grant (1862–1948).
- Selections from the laws of Charles the Great (1900). Translated from the Capitularia Aegum Francorum by Alfred Boretius (1836–1900). Edited by American historian Dana Carleton Munro (1866–1933). From Translations and Reprints from the Original Sources of European History, Volume VI, No. 5.
- History of Charles the Great and Orlando (1812). Ascribed to Turpin, bishop of Rheims, and translated from the Latin by Thomas Rodd (1763–1822). Reprinted in Mediaeval tales (1884) by Henry Morley (1822–1894). Originally in Rodd's Ancient Spanish ballads relating to the twelve peers of France, mentioned in Don Quixote, with English metrical versions (1821).
- The conquests of Charlemagne (1917). A translation of Gabhaltais Shearluis Mhoir, edited from the Book of Lismore and three other vellum manuscripts, by Irish scholar and politician Douglas Ross Hyde (1860–1949). The Irish version of the Pseudo-Turpin work above. Irish Texts Society, 19.
- The Gests of Charlemagne, being a literal translation of the Welsh text (1892). Translated by Welsh academic Rev. Griffith Hartwell Jones (1859–1944). Contains the story of the Voyage to Jerusalem, Pseudo-Turpin chronicle, Roman d'Oteul and Chanson de Roland. In Selections from the Hengwrt mss. preserved in the Peniarth library (1876–1892), Volume II, pp. 437–517. Selections of the Hengwrt–Peniarth manuscripts, edited and translated by the Rev. Robert Williams (1810–1881), continued by G. Hartwell Jones.
- The history of Charlemagne (1907). A translation of Ystorya de Carolo Magno, with a historical and critical introduction by Robert Williams. The translation is of the Welsh version found in the Red Book of Hergest, and includes the works in Gests of Charlemagne, above. In Y Cymmrodor, Volume XX (1907).
- The Irish version of Fierabras (1898). The story of Ferumbras, a Saracen knight who eventually fights for Charlemagne. Edited and translated by Celtic scholar Whitley Stokes (1830–1909). In Revue celtique, XIX (1898), pp. 14–passim. Another version of the story is Sechran na banimpire (1911), edited and translated by Carl Marstrander. In Ériu, Volume 5 (1911), pp. 161–199.
- Charlemagne; an Anglo-Norman poem of the twelfth century (1836). Now first published with an introduction and a glossarial index by French historian and philologist Francisque Xavier Michel (1809–1887).
- The Lyf of the noble and Crysten prynce, Charles the Grete (1880–1881). Translated from the French by William Caxton and printed by him in 1485. Edited from the unique copy in the British Museum, with introduction, notes and glossary, by Sidney John Hervon Herrtage. In Early English Text Society, Extra Series, 36, 37.
- The pilgrimage of Charlemagne to Jerusalem and Charles and Elegast (1928). In Medieval narrative: a book of translations (1928), pp. 77–124. By American medievalist Margaret Schlauch (1898–1986). Charles and Elegast is the translation of the Middle Dutch work Karel ende Elegast.
- The Merry pilgrimage: how Charlemagne went on a pilgrimage to Jerusalem in order to see whether Hugo of Constantinople was a handsomer man than he (1927). Translated by Margaret M. Sherwood (1892–1961)
- The saga of Charlemagne and his heroes (1975–1980). A translation of the Karlamagnús saga by Constance Bartlett Hieatt (died 2011).
- Charlemagne. In A manual of the writings in Middle English,1050–1400 (1923–1927), Chapter I.3, pp. 82–94. By John Edwin Wells (1875–1943).

Charlemagne Romances. The English Charlemagne romances were generally tales cast to show that his pilgrimage to the Holy Land was actually a military campaign. They are found in the publications of the Early English Text Society, Extra Series, Volumes 34–41, 43–45 and 50.

- The English Charlemagne romances. (1879–1887), 12 volumes.
- Sir Ferumbras (1879). The story of Ferumbras, a Saracen knight who eventually fights for Charlemagne. Edited from the unique manuscript Bodleian ms. Ashmole 33, by Sidney John Hervon Herrtage.
- The sege off Melayne and The romance of Duke Rowland and Sir Otuell of Spayne (1880). Edited by Sidney J. H. Herrtage.
- The Lyf of the noble and Crysten prynce, Charles the Grete (1880–1881). See above.
- The Romaunce of the Sowdone of Babylone and of Ferumbras his sone who conquerede Rome (1881). Edited from the unique ms. of English antiquary and book collector Thomas Phillipps (1792–1872). With introduction, notes, and glossary, by Emil Hausknecht (1853–1927).
- The taill of Rauf Coilyear with the fragments of Roland and Vernagu and Otuel (1882). Edited by Sidney J. H. Herrtage. An edition of The Tale of Ralph the Collier.
- The Boke of Duke Huon of Burdeux (1882–1887). Translated into English by John Bourchier, 2nd Baron Berners (1467–1533), and printed by Wynkyn de Worde (died 1534). Edited from the unique copy of the first edition, now in the possession of the Earl of Crawford and Balcarres [James Lindsay] with an introduction, by Sidney Lee (1859–1926).
- The right plesaunt and goodly historie of the foure sonnes of Aymon (1885). English translation from the French by William Caxton, printed about 1489. Edited from the unique copy, now in the possession of Earl Spencer, with an introduction, by Octavia Richardson.

Charroi de Nîmes. The Charroi de Nîmes is an Old French chanson de geste from the first half of the twelfth-century, part of the cycle concerning William of Orange.

- Le charroi de Nîmes (1936). An English translation with notes by Henri J. Godin.

Chartier, Alain. Alain Chartier (c. 1385 – 1430) was a French poet and political writer.

- The curial made by maystere Alain Charretier (1888. Translated thus in Englyssh [English] by William Caxton in 1484. Collated with the French original by French philologist Paul Hyacinthe Meyer (1840–1917), and edited by English philologist Frederick James Furnivall (1825–1910). In Early English Text Society, Extra Series, Volume 54.

Châtelaine de Vergy. Châtelaine de Vergy is an anonymously-written 13th century romance of courtly love in Old French.

- The chatelaine of Vergi: a 13th-century French romance (1903). Done into English by Alice Kemp-Welch, edited with introduction by Louis Brandin (1874–1940). With contemporary illustrations.

Chastellain, Georges. Georges Chastellain (c. 1405 –1475) was a Burgundian poet and chronicler of the Order of the Golden Fleece.

- A fragment of the Chronicle of Normandy, from the year 1414 to the year 1422. From the mss. of Sir George Chastelain, herald and archivist of the Order of the Golden Fleece, and of William Worcester. In Henrici Quinti, Angliae regis Gesta cum Chronica Neustriae, Gallice, ab a. 1414-1422 (1850), pp. 213–262. By Benjamin Williams (1803-1861).

Chaucer, Geoffrey. Geoffrey Chaucer (c. 1340s – 1400) was an English poet and author. Considered the greatest English poet of the Middle Ages, he is best known for The Canterbury Tales.

- Chaucer: a bibliographical manual (1908). By Eleanor Prescott Hammond (1866–1933).
- A bibliography of Chaucer, 1908-1924 (1926). A supplement to Eleanor P. Hammond's work, compiled by Dudley David Griffith (born 1882).
- The riches of Chaucer (1835). In which his impurities have been expunged, his spelling modernised, his rhythm accentuated and his obsolete terms explained; also have been added a few explanatory notes and a new memoir of the poet. By English author and Shakespearian scholar Charles Cowden Clarke (1787–1877).
- The poems of Geoffrey Chaucer, modernized (1841). Edited by English poet and critic Richard Henry Horne (1802–1884). Contains modernizations by the editor, Robert Bell, Elizabeth Barrett Browning, Leigh Hunt, Thomas Powell, William Wordsworth, and "Z.A.Z." Includes A life of Geoffrey Chaucer, by Professor Leonhard Schmitz (1807–1890).
- The Canterbury tales and Faerie queene, with other poems of Chaucer and Spenser (1870). Edited for popular perusal, with current illustrative and explanatory notes, by David Laing Purves (1838–1873).
- The prologue to the Canterbury tales; The romaunt of the rose, and minor poems (1907). Done into modern English by British philologist Rev. Walter William Skeat (1835–1912).
- The complete poetical works of Geoffrey Chaucer (1921). Now first put into modern English, by American scholars John Strong Perry Tatlock (1876–1948) and Percy MacKaye (1875–1956). Illustrations by Warwick Goble (1862–1943).
- Chaucer. In A manual of the writings in Middle English,1050–1400 (1923–1927), Chapter XVI, pp. 599–788. By John Edwin Wells (1875–1943).

Chaucer's Canterbury Tales. The Canterbury Tales are Chaucer's greatest work and is a collection of 24 stories written in Middle English between 1387 and 1400. (cf. Versions of the Canterbury Tales on Wikisource).

- Canterbury tales (1909). With bibliography An edition in which seventeen of the twenty-four tales have been slightly modernized as to spelling by the editor, Arthur Burrell (born 1859). In Everyman's Library, 307.
- The tales of Chaucer: the Canterbury tales done into prose (1930). All of the tales, but with some alteration and compression to render the book suitable for younger readers. By English author Eleanor Farjeon (1881–1965). Illustrated by Scottish artist Sir William Russell Flint (1880–1969).
- Canterbury tales (1934). Rendered into modern English by John Urban Nicolson (1885–1944).; with illustrations by American artist Rockwell Kent (1882–1971) and an introduction by American philologist and folklorist Gordon Hall Gerould (1877–1953).
- The Canterbury tales of Chaucer, modernis'd by several hands (1741). Published by English author and translator George Ogle (1704–1746). The work contains versions by Ogle, John Dryden, Alexander Pope, Thomas Betterton, and others.
- The Canterbury tales of Chaucer; completed in a modern version (1795). By William Lipscomb (1754–1842).
- Tales from Chaucer, in prose (1833). Designed chiefly for the use of young persons. By English author and Shakespearian scholar Charles Cowden Clarke (1787–1877). Later edition in Everyman's Library, 537.
- The Canterbury tales: being selections from the tales of Geoffrey Chaucer (1884). Rendered into modern English with close adherence to the language of the poet by Frank Pitt-Taylor.
- The Canterbury tales of Geoffrey Chaucer: a modern rendering into prose of the Prologue and ten tales (1904). By American dramatist and poet Percy MacKaye (1875–1956). Illustrations by Walter Appleton Clark (1876–1906).
- The Prioresses tale, Sir Thopas, the Monkes tale, the Clerkes tale, the Squieres tale, from the Canterbury tales (1888). Edited and translated by the Rev. Walter William Skeat (1835–1912).
- The tale of the man of lawe; The second nonnes tale; The chanouns yemannes tale (1891). Done into modern English by Walter W. Skeat.
- The story of Patient Griselda, from the Clerk's tale of Geoffrey Chaucer (1906). A tale of Griselda, done into modern English with a few notes, Walter W. Skeat. See also Gualtherus and Griselda, the clerk of Oxford's tale (1741), edited by George Ogle.
- Dryden's Palamon and Arcite; or The Knight's tale from Chaucer (1899). A John Dryden translation known as Palamon and Arcite, from his Fables, Ancient and Modern. Edited with notes and an introduction by Percival Ashley Chubb (1860–1959). Walter W. Skeat's translation (1904).
- January and May; or, The merchant's tale from Chaucer. In Poetical Miscellanies, The Sixth Part (1709) by Alexander Pope. Edited by John Dryden.
- The carpenter of Oxford; or, The miller's tale from Chaucer (1709). Translated by English poet Samuel Cobb (1675–1713).

Chaucer's Other Works. The other works of Geoffrey Chaucer include A treatise on the Astrolabe, Parlement of foules, The Book of the Duchess, The House of Fame, The Legend of Good Women, and Troilus and Criseyde. All are included in [Complete works]: The complete works of Geoffrey Chaucer (1937), edited from numerous manuscripts by the Rev. Walter William Skeat (1835–1912).

- Geoffrey Chaucer's hymn to the Blessed Virgin; the A.B.C., called La Prière de Nostre Dame (1935). Translated by Anselm Mary Townsend (born 1901). [Complete works, pp. 79–80.]
- A treatise on the astrolabe; addressed to his son Lowys by Geoffrey Chaucer, A.D. 1391 (1872). Edited from the earliest mss. by Walter W. Skeat. [Complete works, pp. 396–418.]
- The legend of good women (1889). By Walter W. Skeat. [Complete works, pp. 349–395.]
- Parlement of foules (1914). Translation, with an introduction, notes and glossary, by Charles Maxwell Drennan (1870–1935). [Complete works, pp. 101–110.]
- The house of fame (2000). Translated by Richard Scott Robinson. [Complete works, pp. 326–348.]
- Book of the duchesse (1937). [Complete works, pp. 83–96.]
- Orison of the Blessed Virgin Mary. Modernized by "B". In The Month, LXXV (1892), pp. 11–16. Now attributed to English poet Thomas Hoccleve (1368–1426).
- Troilus and Criseyde (1932). Translated by George Philip Krapp (1872–1934). [Complete works, pp. 306–325.]

Chaucer, Thomas. Thomas Chaucer (c. 1367 – 1434) was an English courtier and politician, and the son of Geoffrey Chaucer.

- Kirk's life records of Thomas Chaucer (1932). By Albert Croll Baugh (1891–1981). In Publications of the Modern Language Association of America, XLVII (1932), pp. 461–515. Abstracts of documents collected by Richard Edward Gent Kirk.

Chess problems. The history of chess writing in medieval times in extremely limited, with prominent authors that include Italian Dominican friar Jacobus de Cessolis (c. 1250 – c. 1322) and Spanish chess player Luis Ramírez de Lucena (c. 1465 – c. 1530). According to the 1911 edition of the Encyclopædia Britannica:

The first known writer on chess was Jacobus de Cessolis, whose main object..was to teach morals rather than chess. He was a Dominican friar, and his treatise...was written before the year 1200. [I]n the year 1474 Caxton, under the title of The Game and Playe of Chesse, printed an English translation. In 1490 we have the Göttinger Handschrift, a work containing nine different openings and fifty problems. The author of this manuscript is not known. Then comes Vicent, a Spanish writer, whose book bears date 1495. Only the title-page has been preserved, the rest of the work having been lost in the first Carlist war. Of Lucena, another Spanish author who wrote in or about 1497, [h]is treatise, Repeticion des Amores y Arte de Axedres, comprises various practical chess matters...

Works include Jacobus de Cessolis' The Game and Playe of the Chesse, published by William Caxton in 1474, and Luis Ramírez de Lucena's Repetición de Amores... (1497). The work Göttinger Handschrift has not been translated into English. (cf. German Wikipedia, Göttinger Handschrift)

- Caxton's Game and playe of the chesse, 1474 (1883). A verbatim reprint of the first edition, with an introduction by English librarian and antiquary William Edward Armytage Axon (1846–1913).
- Good companion (Bonus socius) (1910) A 13th-century manuscript collection of chess problems. Includes a short narrative of Jacobus Cessolis and the two French champions François-André Danican Philidor and Louis-Charles Mahé de La Bourdonnais. Edited by James F. Magee, Jr. (born 1867).
- An anti-feminist treatise of fifteenth-century Spain: Lucena's Repetición de amores (1931). By Barbara Matulka (1903–1936).

Chester plays. The Chester Mystery Plays is a cycle of mystery plays dating back to at least the early part of the 15th century.

- A collection of English miracle-plays or mysteries (1838). Containing ten dramas from the Chester, Coventry, and Towneley series, with an historical view of this description of plays. By William Marriott.
- The Chester plays (1843). A collection of mysteries based upon scriptural subjects, and formerly represented by the trades of Chester at Whitsuntide. Edited by English antiquarian and writer Thomas Wright (1810–1877). Shakespeare society, publications,17, 35.
- The Chester plays (1893–1916). Edited by Hermann Deimling and Dr. Matthews. In Early English Text Society, Extra series, Volumes 62, 115.
- The nativity and adoration cycle of the Chester mysteries (1917). Edited by Frank M. Conroy and Roy Mitchell.
- The rôle of the Virgin Mary in the Coventry, York, Chester and Towneley cycles (1933). By Brother Cornelius Luke.

Chevalier au Cygne. The story of the Knight of the Swan (Chevalier au Cygne) is a medieval tale about the defense of a damsel by mysterious rescuer in a swan-drawn boat. The Crusader cycle of chanson de gestes reworked the story to have the hero a legendary ancestor of Godfrey of Bouillon.

- The history of Helyas, Knight of the Swan (1901). Translated by Robert Copland (fl. 1508–1547), from the French version published in Paris in 1504. [Copland was an English printer and author, and is said to have been a servant of William Caxton, and worked for Wynkyn de Worde.] A literal reprint in the types of Wynkin de Worde after the unique copy printed by him upon parchment in London.

China, Medieval notices of. Accounts of travels of Europeans to China in medieval times. (cf. Europeans in Medieval China)

- Cathay and the Way Thither (1866). Translated and edited by Scottish orientalist and geographer Sir Henry Yule (1820–1889). With a preliminary essay on the intercourse between China and the West prior to the discovery of the Cape Route. Containing the travels of Odoric of Pordenone, ibn Battūta, Francesco Balducci Pegolotti, Giovanni de' Marignolli, and Rashid-al-Din Hamadani, together with letters and reports from missionary friars from Cathay and India from 1292 to 1338. Printed for the Hakluyt society, First series, Volumes 36, 37.
- Cathay and the way thither: being a collection of medieval notices of China (1913–1916). New edition of Henry Yule's translation, revised by French orientalist Henri Cordier (1849–1925). Printed for the Hakluyt society, Second series, Volumes 33, 37, 38, 41.
- The book of Sir Marco Polo the Venetian: concerning the kingdoms and marvels of the East (1875). Newly translated and edited with notes, maps, and other illustrations by Henry Yule.
- Documents relating to the Mission of the Minor Friars to China in the Thirteenth and Fourteenth Centuries. (1914). Latin text with a translation by British sinologist Arthur Christopher Moule (1873–1957). In Journal of the Royal Asiatic Society, (1914) Part 2, pp. 533–599.
- The Minor Friars in China (1917). By Arthur C. Moule. Extracts from the chronicle of Giovanni de' Marignolli written c. 1354 and letters from the khan to pope Benedict XII, with the pope's replies. In Journal of the Royal Asiatic Society, (1917), pp. 1–36.

Chivalry. Chivalry, derived from the French chevalier, was a code of conduct developed between 1170 and 1220. It was associated with the institution of knighthood, and knights' and gentlemen's behaviours were governed by chivalrous social codes. Sir Walter Scott (1771–1832), author of Ivanhoe, was the most prominent chronicler of the practice, as documented in his Chivalry, found in the Encyclopædia Britannica, 7th Edition (1842), Volume 6, pp. 592–617.

- The history of the valiant knight Arthur of Little Britain: A romance of chivalry (1814). Originally translated from the French by John Berners Bourchier (1467–1533) and updated by English literary antiquary Edward Vernon Utterson (1775–1856).
- The book of the Ordre of chyualry (1926). Translated and printed by William Caxton from a French version of Ramón Lull's Le libre del orde de cauayleria, together with Adam Loutfut's Scottish transcript (Harleian ms. 6149), edited by Alfred Thomas Plested Byles. Published for Early English Text Society, Original series, 168
- The book of chivalry of Geoffroi de Charny: text, context, and translation (1996). By medievalists Richard W. Kaeuper and Elspeth Kennedy (1921–2006). A translation of Livre de chevalerie (c. 1350) by French knight and author Geoffroi de Charny (1300–1356), the first recorded owner of the Shroud of Turin, lost after the sack of Constantinople in 1204.
- La Chevalerie (1884). A comprehensive study of chivalry and its history by Émile Théodore Léon Gautier (1832–1897), a French literary historian. Renown for its length and lavish drawings, it was llustrated by Luc-Olivier Merson (1846–1920), Édouard François Zier (1856–1924) and Michał Elwiro Andriolli (1836–1893).
- The honour of chivalry (1703). Or, The famous and delectable history of Don Bellianis of Greece. Containing the valiant exploits of that magnanimous and heroick prince, son unto the emperor Don Bellaneo of Greece (Belianís de Grecia). Translated out of the Italian by Jerónimo Fernández.
- The combat of the thirty. From an old Breton lay of the fourteenth century (1859). Translated by English novelist William Harrison Ainsworth (1805–1882). An account of the Combat of the Thirty of 1351, regarded as a noble display of chivalric ideals. In Bentley's miscellany, Volume XLV (1859), pp. 5–10, 445–459.
- Chronicles of England, France, and the Adjoining Countries (1803–1810). By Jean Froissart (c. 1337 – c. 1405). Known as Froissart's Chronicles, it is recognized as an expression of the chivalric revival of the 14th century. From the French editions, with variations and additions from many celebrated manuscripts, edited by French historian Jean-Baptiste de La Curne de Sainte-Palaye (1697–1781. Translated by English writer and printer Thomas Johnes (1748–1816).

Choumnos, Geōgios. Geōgios Choumnos (died after 1342) was a Byzantine statesman.

- Old Testament legends from a Greek poem on Genesis and Exodus (1925). Edited, with an introduction, metrical translation, notes and glossary, from a manuscript in the British Museum, by Frederick Henry Marshall (1878–1955).

Chrétien de Troyes. Chrétien de Troyes (fl. 1160–1191) was a French poet and trouvère known for his writing on Arthurian subjects. See Arthurian legends.

- King Arthur and the table round: tales chiefly after the Old French of Crestien of Troyes (1897). with an account of Arthurian romance, and notes by William Wells Newell (1839–1907).
- The legend of the Holy Grail and the Perceval of Crestien of Troyes (1902). By William W. Newell.
- Arthurian romances (1913). Translated by William Wistar Comfort (1874–1955). In Everyman's Library, 698.
- Eric and Enid (1913). A translation of Erec and Enide by W. Wistar Comfort.
- Cligés: a romance (1912). Now translated by Laetitia Jane Gardiner, from the Old French.
- King William the Wanderer (1904). An old English saga from Old French versions, translated by English author, artist and antiquary William Gershom Collingwood (1854–1932).
- Yvain, the Knight of the Lion (1913). A translation of Yvain, the Knight of the Lion by W. Wistar Comfort, Arthurian romances (1913), pp. 180–269. Also translations by Annette B. Hopkins (1916) and Burton Raffel (1987).

Christodulos. Christodoulos of Alexandria, also known as Abd-el-Messiah (died 1077), was the Coptic Orthodox Pope of Alexandria.

- The canons of Christodoulos (1932). Arabic text with translation by British specialist in Arabic Coptology O. H. E . (Oswald Hugh Ewart) Burmester (1897–1977). In Le muséon, Volume XLV (1932), pp. 77–84.

Christopher, Saint. Saint Christopher (died c. 251) was a martyr killed in the reign of the 3rd-century Roman emperor Decius (reigned 249–251) or alternatively under the emperor Maximinus Daia (reigned 308–313).

- The passion of St. Christopher. Translated by J. Fraser. In Revue celtique, XXXIV (1913), pp. 307–335.
- The life of S. Christopher. In The golden legend; or, Lives of the saints (1483), Volume IV, pp. 111–119. As Englished by William Caxton.

Christopher (Copt). Christopher (4th century) was a compatriot of Isaac Tiphre (see Abadir and Iraja) who wrote a Coptic manuscript of the 10th century, in the collection of Lord Zouche.

- Martyrdom of Isaac Tiphre (1886). By British Egyptologist and orientalist Sir Ernest Alfred Wallis Budge (1857–1934). In Proceedings of the Society of Biblical Archaeology, Volume VII (1884), pp. 94–97, IX (1886), pp. 74–90.

Chronicle of Edessa. The Chronicle of Edessa, or Chronicon edesanum, is an anonymous record of the history of Edessa written in the mid-6th century in the Syriac language. It covers the period 132 BC to AD 540.

- The chronicle of Edessa (1864). Translated by Benjamin Harris Cowper. In the Journal of sacred literature, New series, Volume V (1874), pp. 28–45.

Chronicles of England and London. Medieval chronicles of England, in Middle English, Latin or Anglo-Norman, exemplified by the Brut chronicle, Gregory's chronicle, and the Chronicon Angliae Petriburgense, continued with chronicles of London. It also includes the Chronicle of Melrose, the oldest independent account of the sealing of Magna Carta.

- Six old English chronicles (1872). Including Ethelwerd's Chronicle, Asser's Life of Alfred, Geoffrey of Monmouth's British history, Gildas, Nennius; and the spurious chronicle of Richard of Cirencester. Two of which are now first translated from the monkish Latin originals, by English historian John Allen Giles (1808–1884).
- The Brut: or the Chronicles of England (1906–1908). Edited from ms. Rawl. B 171, Bodleian Library, with introduction, notes and glossary, by Friedrich Daniel Wilhelm Brie (1880–1948). (cf. German Wikipedia, Friedrich Brie). In Early English Text Society, Original series, Volumes 131, 136.
- The chronicle of William Gregory, Skinner. In The Historical collections of a citizen of London in the fifteenth century (1876), pp. 55–240. By Sir William Gregory (c. 1400–1467). Edited by British historian James Gairdner (1828–1912). With an Appendix: Mayors and Sheriffs, pp. 241–258.
- Chronicon Angliae, ab anno domini 1328 usque ad annum 1388, auctore monacho quodam Sancti Albani (1874). Edited by Sir Edward Maunde Thompson (1840–1929), a British palaeographer and first director of the British Museum.
- Transcript of a chronicle in the Harleian Library of mss. 6217, entitled, “An Historicall relation of certain passages about the end of King Edward the Third, and of his Death" communicated in a letter addressed to the Right Honourable the Earl of Aberdeen. By English antiquarian Thomas Amyot (1775–1850).
- The chronicle of Melrose from AD 731 to AD 1235 (1856). In The church historians of England (1856), Volume IV, Part 1, pp. 77–242. By English archivist Joseph Stevenson (1806–1895).
- A chronicle of London, from 1089 to 1483 (1827). Written in the fifteenth century, and for the first time printed from mss. in the British museum: to which are added numerous contemporary illustrations, consisting of royal letters, poems, and other articles descriptive of public events, or of the manners and customs of the metropolis. Edited by English antiquary Sir Nicholas Harris Nicolas (1799–1848) and Edward Tyrrell.
- Chronicles of the mayors and sheriffs of London, A. D. 1188 to A. D. 1274 (1863). Translated from the original Latin and Anglo-Norman of Liber de antiquis legibus in the possession of the corporation of the city of London. Attributed to London chronicler and merchant Arnold Fitz-Thedmar (1201 – c. 1274).
- The French chronicle of London, A. D. 1259 to A. D. 1343. From the original Anglo-Norman of the Chroniques de London, preserved in the Cottonian collection in the British museum. Translated, with notes and illustrations, by English translator, lexicographer, and antiquary Henry Thomas Riley (1816–1878).
- The chronicles of London from 44 Hen. III to 17 Edw. III (1885–1886). Translated from a ms. in the Cottonian collection, by Scottish historian Edmund Marsden Goldsmid.

Chronicles of Ireland. See Annals of Ireland.

Chronicles of the Isle of Man. The medieval history of the Isle of Man is found primarily in various editions of the Chronica Regum Manniæ et Insularum and other documents published by the Manx Society.

- Chronica regvm Manniae et insvlarvm: The chronicle of Man and the Sudreys (1874). From the manuscript codex in the British museum, with historical notes by Norwegian historian Peter Andreas Munch (1810–1863) and Bishop Alexander Goss (1814–1872).
- The chronicle of the Isle of Man (1858). In The church historians of England (1858), Volume V, Part 1, pp. 383–405. By English archivist Joseph Stevenson (1806–1895).
- The chronicle of Man and the Isles (1786). In Antiquitates Celto-Normannicae (1786). By the Rev. James Johnstone (died 1798).
- An abstract of the laws, customs, and ordinances of the Isle of Man (1867). Compiled by John Parr and edited, with notes, by Sir James Gell (1823–1905).

Chronicles of Scotland. Chronicles of Scotland and northern England that include the Chronicle of Holyrood and the Lanercost chronicle. These include the Battle of the Standard and the Wars of Scottish Independence.

- Early Sources of Scottish History, A.D. 500 to 1286 (1922). By Scottish historian Alan Orr Anderson (1879–1958).
- The early chronicles relating to Scotland (1912). By Sir Herbert Maxwell (1845–1937).
- The chronicle of Holyrood from AD 1 to AD 1163 (1856). In The church historians of England (1856), Volume IV, Part 1, pp. 59–76. By English archivist Joseph Stevenson (1806–1895).
- A Scottish chronicle known as the Chronicle of Holyrood (1938). Edited by Marjorie Ogilvie Anderson (1909–2002), with some additional notes by Scottish historian Alan Orr Anderson. In Publications of the Scottish History Society, Third series, Volume 30 (1938).
- The chronicle of Lanercost, 1272–1346 (1913). Translated with notes Sir Herbert Maxwell.
- The chronicle of John, prior of Hexham, from AD 1130 to AD 1154 (1856). A translation of a work by John of Hexham (c. 1160 – 1209). In The church historians of England , Volume IV, Part 1, pp. 1–32. By Joseph Stevenson.
- The acts of King Stephen, and the Battle of the Standard, by Richard, prior of Hexham, from AD 1135 to AD 1139 (1856). A translation of a work by Richard of Hexham (fl. 1141). In The church historians of England , Volume IV, Part 1, pp. 33–58. By Joseph Stevenson.
- Chronicle of the war between the English and the Scots, AD 1173, 1174 (1856). A translation of the work by Jordan Fantosme (died c. 1185). In The church historians of England , Volume IV, Part 1, pp. 243–288. By Joseph Stevenson.

Chronicles of Wales. The chronicles of Wales include Brut y Tywysogion (Chronicle of the Princes), Aneirin's principal work Y Gododdin, the chronicles of Adam of Usk, and the ancient books of Wales including the Black Book of Carmarthen; the Book of Aneurin; the Book of Taliesin; and the Red Book of Hergest.

- Brut y tywysogion: The chronicle of the princes of Wales (1860). Edited by English antiquary and Anglican priest John Williams ab Ithel (1811–1862).
- Y Gododin: a poem on the battle of Cattraeth by Aneurin, a Welsh bard of the sixth century (1852). Translated by John Williams ab Ithel.
- The Brychan documents. Edited and translated by Welsh historian the Rev. Arthur Wade-Evans (1875–1964). In Y Cymmrodor, XIX (1906), pp. 18–50.
- Chronicon Adæ de Usk: A. D. 1377–1404 (1876) and Chronicon Adæ de Usk: A. D. 1377–1421 (1904). Edited with a translation and notes by British palaeographer Sir Edward Maunde Thompson (1840–1929).
- The four ancient books of Wales containing the Cymric poems attributed to the bards of the sixth century, 2 volumes (1868). By Scottish historian and antiquary William Forbes Skene (1809–1892).

Chroniques de Saint-Denis. Joan the Maid of Orleans, Being that Portion of the Chronicles of St. Denis which deals with Her Life and Times, from the Chroniques de France printed in Paris in 1493 (1938). Translated by Pauline Bridge Seeberger Sowers, with reproductions of woodcuts from original of Antoine Vérard (fl. 1485 – 1512)

Chrysostomus, Johannes. Johannes (John) Chrysostom (c. 347 – 407) was an important early Church father who served as archbishop of Constantinople.

- Selected works (1839–1877). In A library of fathers of the holy Catholic church: anterior to the division of the East and West (1838-1881), translated by John Henry Parker.
- Works of Chrysostom. In Nicene and Post-Nicene Fathers: Series I (1885) (Wikisource)
- Saint Chrysostome his Paraenesis, or Admonition wherein hee recalls Theodorus the fallen; Or generally an exhortation for desperate sinners (1654). An excerpt from the homiletic writings of Chrysostomus, probably written during the time of his episcopate when Theodosius was emperor of Constantinople, and Eudoxia his empress. Translated by William Villiers, 2nd Viscount Grandison. Dedicated to Sir Thomas Wentworth, 1st Earl of Cleveland, a fellow prisoner of Villiers at the Tower of London.
- The golden book of St. John Chrysostom, concerning the education of children (1659). Translated out of the Greek by English writer and gardener John Evelyn (1620–1706). In The miscellaneous writings of John Evelyn (1825), pp. 103–140, collected by English librarian and antiquary William Upcott (1779–1845).
- St. Chrysostom of the priesthood: In six books (1759). By the Rev. John Bunce.
- Four discourse of Chrysostom, chiefly on the parable of the rich man and Lazarus (1869). Translated by F. Allen.
- Fragments of a Coptic version of an encomium on Elijah the Tishbite, attributed to Saint John Chrysostom (1893). By British Egyptologist and orientalist Sir Ernest Alfred Wallis Budge (1857–1934). In Transactions of the Society of Biblical Archæology, Volume IX (1893), pp. 355–404.
- Sermon on alms (1917). Delivered by Chysostom at Antioch after passing through the marketplace in winter, seeing paupers and beggars lying neglected. Translated by Margaret M. Sherwood (1892–1961) from the parallel Greek and Latin texts of the Abbé Migne, in Volume 51 of his Patrologia Graecae.

Church and the Jews. The church and the Jews in the XIIIth century (1933). A study of their relations during the years 1198–1254 based on the papal letters and the conciliar decrees of the periods. By Solomon Grayzel (1896–1980).

Ciarán. Saint Ciarán of Clonmacnoise (c. 516 – c. 549) was one of the Twelve Apostles of Ireland and the first abbot of Clonmacnoise. He is known as Ciarán the Younger.

- The Latin and Irish lives of Ciaran (1921). By Irish archaeologist Robert Alexander Stewart Macalister (1870–1950).

Ciarán of Saigir. Saint Ciarán of Saigir (died c. 530) was bishop of Saighir and one of the Twelve Apostles of Ireland. He is considered to be the first saint to have been born in Ireland, although the legend that he preceded Saint Patrick is questionable. He is known as Ciarán the Elder.

- Life of S. Kieran (1892). In Silva gadelica, Volume II, pp. 1–17. Translated by Irish antiquarian Standish Hayes O'Grady (1832–1915).
- Life of Cairan of Saigir (1922). In Bethada náem nÉrenn: Lives of Irish saints, Volume II, pp. 99–120. Translated by English historian Charles Plummer (1851–1927).
- St. Ciaran, patron of Ossory (1876). A memoir of his life and times, comprising a preliminary enquiry respecting the period of his birth; an historical commentary on the legend of his life; some notes on his death, and on the surviving memorials of his mission. By John Hogan. Translated from original documents including Betha Chiaráin tSaighre in Silva gadelica, Volume I, pp. 1–16, and Betha Cairáin Saigre I, II, in Bethada náem nÉrenn, Volume I, pp. 103–124.
- Beaṫa naoim ċiaráin saiġre: Life of S. Kiaran (the elder) of Seir (1895). The gaelic text, edited, with literal English translation and notes, by D. B. Mulcahy.

Cid Campeador, El (El Cid). El Cid, name Rodrigo Díaz de Vivar (c. 1043 – 1099), was a Castilian knight and warlord in medieval Spain, known by the Moors as El Cid, and the Christians as El Campeador. His deeds are recorded in the Castilian epic poem El Cantar de mio Cid.

- The poem of the Cid (1879). A translation from the Spanish, with introduction and notes by John Ormsby (1829–1895).
- Poem of the Cid (1907–1908) Text reprinted from the unique manuscript at Madrid, 3 volumes. By Archer Milton Huntington (1870–1955).
- The lay of the Cid (1919). Translated into English verse by Robert Selden Rose (1888–1964) and Leonard Bacon (1887–1954).
- The tale of the warrior lord: El cantar de mio Cid (1930). Translated by Merriam Sherwood (1892–1961).
- Translations from the poem of the Cid (1872). In The works of John Hookham Frere in verse and prose, Volume II, pp. 409–440. Collected with a prefatory memoir by his nephews W. E. and Sir Bartle Frere. Translations by English diplomat and writer John Hookham Frere (1769–1846).

Cináed ua hArtacáin. Cináed ua hArtacáin (died 975) was an Irish Gaelic poet.

- The deaths of some Irish heroes (1902). Edited and translated by Celtic scholar Whitley Stokes (1830–1909). In Revue celtique, XXIII (1902), pp. 303–348.

Cisneros, Garcias de. Garcias de Cisneros (1455–1510) was abbot of the Santa Maria de Montserrat Abbey in Spain.

- Book of exercises for the spiritual life and directory for the canonical hours (1876). Translated by a monk of St. Augustine's monastery.
- Book of exercises for the spiritual life (1929). Written in the year 1500 by Garcia Jimenez de Cisneros, and translated from the original Spanish by Edgar Allison Peers (1891–1952). First English translation of the Spanish edition of 1912.

=== CL–CO ===
Clare of Assisi. Saint Clare of Assisi (1194–1253) is an Italian saint, and one of the first followers of Saint Francis of Assisi. She founded the Order of Poor Ladies, known today as the Poor Clares.

- The princess of poverty: Saint Clare of Assisi and the Order of Poor Ladies (1900). By Father Marianus Fiege.
- The life of Saint Clare (1910). Ascribed to Friar Thomas of Celano (c. 1185 – c. 1265) of the order of Friars minor. Translated and edited from the earliest mss. by Fr. Paschal Robinson (1870–1948). With an appendix containing the rule of Saint Clare.
- The rule of Saint Clare (1912). Its observance in the light of early documents: a contribution to the seventh centenary of the saint's call. By Fr. Paschal Robinson, of the Order of Friars Minor.

Claudianus, Claudius. Claudius Claudianus, known as Claudian (c. 370 – c. 404), was a Latin poet, associated with the court of the Roman emperor Arcadius and his brother Honorius, and particularly with the general Stilicho.

- The works of Claudian (1817). Translated into English verse by A. Hawkins.
- Claudian (1922). With an English translation by Maurice Platnauer (1887–1974).
- The rape of Proserpine: with other poems, from Claudian (1814). Translated into English verse, with a prefatory discourse, and occasional notes. By Jacob George Strutt.
- The rape of Proserpine: a poem in three books (1854). [Incomplete.] To which are added, the Phoenix: an idyll and the Nile: a fragment. Translated from the Latin of Claudius Claudianus, by the Very Rev. Henry Edward John Howard (1795–1868).
- The rape of Proserpine, from Claudian (1714). With the story of Sextus and Erichtho, from Pharsalia, Book 6, of Lucan. Translated by Jabez Hughes (c. 1685 – 1731).
- Claudian's Panegyrick on the third consulate of Honorius (1724). Translated from the original, in Miscellaneous translations, in prose and verse, from Roman poets, orators, and historians (1724), by English writer and literary critic William Warburton (1698–1779). Reprinted in Tracts, by Warburton, and a Warburtonian [Richard Hurd, Bishop of Worcester]: not admitted Into the collections of their respective works (1789), edited by Samuel Parr (1747–1825).

Clement I. Pope Clement I, or Saint Clement of Rome (1st century), was the fourth Bishop of Rome, from 88 until 99. His principal work was the First Epistle of Clement. Other works once attributed to him, including the Second Epistle of Clement, are now believed to be written by others.

- The epistle of St. Clement: bishop of Rome (1899). Translated by bishop John Allen Fitzgerald Gregg (1873–1961).
- First Epistle to the Corinthians (1867). By Scottish classical scholar Sir James Donaldson (1831–1915). Ante-Nicene Christian library, Volume I. The Apostolic Fathers with Justin Martyr and Irenaeus.
- An English translation of the so-called Second epistle of Clement to the Corinthians (1922). By the Society for Promoting Christian Knowledge.
- The Clementine homilies (1870). Books I–V translated by Rev. Thomas Smith; Books VI–XII by Peter Peterson; and Books XIII–XX by James Donaldson. In Ante-Nicene Christian library, Volume XVII.
- A new document on Clement of Rome, his relations and his interview with Simon Peter (1914). Translated from the Syriac by Iraqi historian Alphonse Mingana (1878–1937). In The expositor, 8th series, Volume VIII (1914), pp. 227–242.
- Recognitions of Clement, or The travels of Peter (1711). In Primitive Christianity reviv'd: in four volumes (1711), Volume V, by English theologian and historian William Whiston (1667–1752).
- Recognitions of Clement (1808). Translated by Thomas Smith. In the Ante-Nicene Christian library, Volume III.
- The writings of Tatian and Theophilus, and the Clementine Recognitions (1867). By Marcus Dods (1834–1909), Thomas Smith and the Rev. Benjamin Plummer Pratten.
- Two epistles on virginity, ascribed to Clemens Romanus (1862). Transcribed from the Syriac by Benjamin Harris Cowper. In the Journal of sacred literature, 3rd series, Volume XIV (1862), pp. 31–50. A translation by Benjamin P. Pratten is found in the Ante-Nicene Christian library, Volume XIV, pp. 365–395.

Clement of Alexandria. Clement of Alexandria, known as Titus Flavius Clemens (c. 150 – c. 215), was a Christian theologian and philosopher who taught at the Catechetical School of Alexandria. Among his pupils were Origen and Alexander of Jerusalem.

- The writings of Clement of Alexandria (1868–1869). Translated by the Rev. William Wilson. In the Ante-Nicene Christian library, Volumes IV, XII.
- Fragments of Clement Alexandrinus (1871). Various translators. In the Ante-Nicene Christian library, Volume XXIV, pp. 139–181.
- Clement of Alexandria (1919). with an English translation by George William Butterworth (born 1879). Includes :The exhortation to the Greeks; The rich mans̕ salvation; and the fragment of an address entitled, To the newly baptized.
- A homily of Clement of Alexandria, entitled: Who is the rich man that is being saved? 1901). By Percy Mordaunt Barnard (1868–1941).
- Clement of Alexandria. Miscellanies book VII (1902). The Greek text, with introduction, translation, notes, dissertations and indices, by Irish-born theologian Fenton John Anthony Hort (1828–1892) and English classical scholar Joseph Bickersteth Mayor (1828–1916).
- The Excerpta ex Theodoto of Clement of Alexandria (1934). Edited with translation, introduction and notes by Robert Pierce Casey (1897–1959). Surviving fragments by Theodotus of Byzantium and other followers of the Gnostic movement of Valentinianism.
- Christian doctrine and practice in the second century (1844). By Caroline Frances Cornwallis (1786–1858).
- Selections from the writings of Clement of Alexandria (1914). By Rufus Matthew Jones (1863–1948).

Cloud of Unknowing. The Cloud of Unknowing is an anonymous work of Christian mysticism written in Middle English in the latter half of the 14th century.

- The divine cloud (1871). With notes and a preface by Benedictine mystic Augustine Baker (1575–1641). Edited by the Rev. Henry Collins.
- A book of contemplation the which is called The cloud of unknowing, in the which a soul is oned with God (1912). Edited from the British Museum ms. Harl. 674, with an introduction by English writer and pacifist Evelyn Underhill (1875–1941).
- The cloud of unknowing and other treatises by an English mystic of the fourteenth century (1924). With a commentary on the Cloud by Father Augustine Baker, edited by Dom Justin McCann.

Cocles, Bartolomeo della Rocca. Bartolomeo della Rocca, known as Cocles (1467–1504), was an Italian scholar of chiromancy, physiognomy, astrology, and geomancy.

- The contemplation of mankinde (1571). By English astrologer and translator Thomas Hyll (born ca. 1528) (perhaps writing as Didymus Mountain). Second edition of A brief and most pleasaūt epitome of the whole are of physiognomies, by that learned chyrurgian Cocles.

Cogadth Gaedhel re Gallaibh. Cogadh Gáedel re Gallaibh is a medieval Irish text that tells of the raids of the Vikings and Uí Ímair dynasty in Ireland and the Irish king Brian Boru's war against them, from the Battle of Sulcoit in 967 through the Battle of Clontarf in 1014, in which Boru was slain.

- Cogadh Gaedhel re Gallaibh (1867). The war of the Gaedhil with The Gaill, or, the invasions of Ireland by the Danes and other Norsemen. The original Irish text, edited with translation and introduction, by Irish historian James Henthorn Todd (1805–1869). Published by the authority of the lords commissioners of Her Majesty's Treasury, under the direction of the Master of the Rolls. Rolls series, 48.

Cóir Anmann. Cóir Anmann, or Fitness of Names (1897). Translated and edited by Celtic scholar Whitley Stokes (1830–1909). In Irische Texte mit Wörterbuch, 3rd series, Part 2 (1897), pp. 285–444.

Coley, Henry. Henry Coley (1633–1704) was an English astrologer and mathematician. Coley was an amanuensis of astrologer William Lilly (1602–1681).

- Anima astrologiæ; or, A guide for astrologers (1886). Being the one hundred and forty-six considerations of the famous astrologer, Guido Bonatus, translated from the Latin by H. Coley, together with the choicest aphorisms of the seven segments of Italian polymath Gerolamo Cardan (1501–1576) of Milan, edited by William Lilly in 1675. Republished from the original edition with notes and a preface by William Charles Eldon Serjeant.

Colmán mac Lúacháin. Saint Colmán mac Luacháin was an early Irish abbot (fl. 7th century), founder and patron saint of Lann.

- Betha Colmáin maic Lúacháin: Life of Colmán son of Lúachan (1911). Edited from a ms. in the library of Rennes, with translation, introduction, notes, and indices by German Celtic scholar Kuno Meyer (1858–1919). Reprinted inTodd Lecture Series, 17.

Columba. Saint Columba (521–597) was an Irish abbot and missionary evangelist credited with spreading Christianity in what is today Scotland at the start of the Hiberno-Scottish mission. He was one of the Twelve Apostles of Erin. See works on the life of Columba by Adamnan and the discussion in Early Sources of Scottish History, A.D. 500 to 1286, Volume I, pp. xxi–xxii, 160–161.

- Saint Columba. (1858). In Ulster Journal of Archaeology, Volume 6, pp. 1–39.
- Betha Choluim Chille: On the life of Saint Columbo. In Three Middle-Irish homilies on the lives of Saints Patrick, Brigit and Columba (1877). Edited by Celtic scholar Whitley Stokes (1830–1909).
- Life of Colum-Cille. In Lives of saints: from the Book of Lismore (1890), pp. 168–181. Edited, with a translation, notes and indices, by W. Stokes. Printed for the Irish archaeological and Celtic society.
- The book of hymns of the ancient Church of Ireland (1855–1869). Edited, from the original manuscript in the library of Trinity college, Dublin, with translation and notes, by Irish historian James Henthorn Todd (1805–1869). Irish archaeological and Celtic society, 17, 23.
- The old Irish life of St. Columba; being a discourse on his life and character delivered to the brethren on his festival (1887). Translated from the original Irish text by Irish scholar William Maunsell Hennessy (1829–1889). In Celtic Scotland: a history of ancient Alban (1886–1890), Volume II, pp. 467–507, by Scottish historian and antiquary William Forbes Skene (1809–1892).
- Life of Columb Cille (1918). Compiled by Manus O'Donnell in 1532. Edited and translated from ms. Rawlinson B.514 in the Bodleian Library, by Gertrude Schoepperle (1882–1921), Richard Henebry (1863–1916), and Andrew O'Kelleher (born 1883). Partially printed in Zeitschrift für celtische Philologie, Volume III (1901), pp. 516–570; Volume IV (1903), pp. 276–331; Volume IX (1913), pp. 242–287; and Volume XI (1917), pp. 114–147.
- The life of St. Columba from the Edinburgh ms. (1927). Edited and translated by Paul Grosjean (1900–1964). In Scottish gaelic studies, Volume II (1927), pp. 111–171. Supplementary note, ibid (1931).
- A tale of Doomsday Colum Cille should have left untold (1931). Edited and translated by Paul Grosjean. In Scottish gaelic studies, Volume III (1931), pp. 73–85, 188–199.

Coluthus. Coluthus of Lycopolis (fl. 500) was an epic poet writing in Greek, who flourished during the reign of Byzantine emperor Anastasius I (491–518).

- The rape of Helen, from the Greek of Coluthus, with miscellaneous notes (1786). Translated by William Beloe (1756–1817).
- The Tragedies of L. Annaeus Seneca the philosopher; viz., Medea, Phaedra and Hippolytus, Troades, or the royal captives, and the Rape of Helen, out of the Greek of Coluthus (1702). Translated into English verse with annotations, by English translator and poet Sir Edward Sherburne (1618–1702).
- The Argonautics of Apollonius Rhodius, in four books (1780). By English poet and translator Francis Fawkes (1720–1777). Completed by his coadjutor and editor Henry Meen, who annexed a translation of Coluthus's Greek poem on the Rape of Helen, or The origin of the Trojan war; with notes. Reprinted in The works of the British poets (1795), Volume XIII. With prefaces, biographical and critical by Scottish author and critic Robert Anderson (1750–1830).
- Oppian, Colluthus, Tryphiodorus (1928). With a translation by A. W. Mair. In Loeb classical library.

Combat des trente. The combat of the thirty. From an old Breton lay of the fourteenth century (1859). Translated by English novelist William Harrison Ainsworth (1805–1882). An account of the Combat of the Thirty of 1351, in Bentley's miscellany, Volume XLV (1859), pp. 5–10, 445–459.

Comgall's rule. An Old-Irish metrical rule (1904). An anonymous poem concerning the rule of the Lord, or Comgall's rule, written c. 800, transcribed by John Strachan (1862-1907) In Ériu, Volume I (1904). pp. 191–208. The rules are attributed to Saint Comgall (c. 510 – 597 or 602), an early Irish saint and the founder of the Irish monastery at Bangor. According to Adamnan's Life of Columba, there was a close connection between Comgall and Saint Columba.

Comines, Philippe de. Philippe de Comines (1447–1511), sieur d'Argenton, was a French writer and diplomat, called "the first truly modern writer."

- The history of Comines (1897). Englished by Thomas Danett, anno 1596. With an introduction by English literary journalist and author Charles Whibley (1859–1930). The Tudor translations, 17, 18.
- The memoirs of Philip de Comines (1712). Containing the history of Louis XI and Charles VIII of France, and of Charles the Bold, Duke of Burgundy, to which princes he was secretary; also the history of Edward IV and Henry VII of England, including that of Europe for almost half the fifteenth century; with a supplement, as also several original treaties, notes and observations; and lastly, the secret history of Louis XI out of a book called The scandalous chronicle. With the life of the author prefixed to the whole, with notes upon it, by Sleidan (1506–1556). Faithfully translated from the late edition of Denis Godefroy (1549–1622).; to which are added remarks on all the occurrences relating to England, by Thomas Uvedale.
- The memoirs of Philippe de Commynes, lord of Argenton (1855–1856). Containing the histories of Louis XI and Charles VIII, kings of France, and of Charles the Bold, duke of Burgundy. To which is added, The scandalous chronicle; or, Secret history of Louis XI, by Jean de Troyes. Edited with a biography and notes, by Sir Andrew Richard Scobel (1831–1916).
- Notes on Louis XI, with some short extracts from Commines' Memoirs (1878). Translated by A. E.
- Memoirs: the reign of Louis XI, 1461-1483 [by] Philippe de Commynes (1972). Translated with an introduction by Michael Jones.
- The universal spider: the life of Louis XI of France [by] Philippe de Commynes (1973). Translated and edited by Paul Kendall.

Commodianus. Commodianus (3rd century) was a Christian Latin poet, who flourished c. 250.

- The instructions of Commodianus, in favor of Christian discipline, against the gods of the heathens (1880). Expressed in acrostics and transcribed by Robert Ernest Wallis (1820–1900). In Ante-Nicene Christian library, Volume XVIII, and Ante-Nicene Fathers. Volume IV: Fathers of the Third Century, Commodianus.

Comnena, Anna. Anna Comnena, also known as Anna Komnena (1083 – 1150s), was a Byzantine princess and author of the Alexiad, an account of the reign of her father Alexios I Komnenos, Byzantine emperor from 1081 to 1118.

- The Alexiad of the Princess Anna Comnena (1928). Translated by Elizabeth Anna Sophia Dawes (1864–1954). (The Alexiad, Wikisource).

Compagni, Dino. Dino Compagni (c. 1255 – 1324) was an Italian historical writer and political figure.

- The chronicle of Dino Compagni (1906). Translated by Else Cecilia Mendelssohn Benecke (1873–1917) and Alan George Ferrers Howell (1855–1928).

Conn Cétchathach. Conn Cétchathach, Conn of the hundred battles, was son of Fedlimid Rechtmar, was a High King of Ireland, and the ancestor of the Connachta and Uí Néill dynasties.

- Aided Chuind Chétchathaig, or Death of Conn of the Hundred Battles (1912). Translated by Osborn J. Bergin (1873–1950). In Zeitschrift für celtische Philologie, Volume VIII (1912), pp. 274–277. From the Book of Lecan.
- Cath Mhuighe Léana, or, The battle of Magh Leana; together with Tocmarc Moméra, or The courtship of Momera (1855). Now for the first time edited, with translation and notes, by Eugene Curry.
- The Adventures of Art (Airt), son of Conn, and the Courtship of Delbchæm. (1907). Edited and translated by Irish scholar of Celtic studies Richard Irvine Best (1872–1959). In Ériu, Volume III (1907), pp. 149–173. Reprinted in Ancient Irish tales (1936), edited by Thomas Peete Cross (1879–1951) and Clark Harris Slover.
- The adventures of Condla Ruad (1874). Edited and translated by J. O'Beirne Crowe. In The Journal of the Royal Historical and Archaeological Association of Ireland, Fourth series, Volume III (1874), No. 18, pp. 118–133.

Conquête d'Irlande. Conquête d'Irlande is an Anglo-Norman poem, known as The song of Dermot and the Earl, on the Norman conquest of Ireland with the arrival of Richard de Clare, 2nd Earl of Pembroke (Strongbow), in 1170. The poem mentions Morice Regan, secretary to Dairmaid mac Murchadha, king of Leinster, who was, at the least, and eyewitness to the events described therein.

- The song of Dermot and the Earl (1892). An Old French poem from the Carew manuscript no. 596 in the archiepiscopal library at Lambeth palace. With literal translation and notes, with a facsimile and map, by Irish historian Goddard Henry Orpen (1852–1932).
- Anglo-Norman poem on the conquest of Ireland by Henry the Second (1837). From the Carew ms., edited by French historian and philologist Francisque Xaview Michel (1809–1887). With an introductory essay on the history of the Anglo-Norman conquest of Ireland, by English antiquary Thomas Wright (1810–1877).

Constantine I. Constantine I, known as Constantine the Great (c. 272 – 337) was Roman emperor from 306 to 337.

- The forged donation of Constantine, AD 800 (1896). A translation of the Donation of Constantine, a decree purportedly transferring imperial power to the pope. In Select historical documents of the middle ages (1896), pp. 319–321. Translated and edited by Ernest Flagg Henderson (1861–1928) from Karl Zeumer's edition of the text Die Constantinische Schenkungsurkunde (1888).

Consulate of the sea. Il consolato del mare; the judicial order of proceedings before the consular court (1809–1810). Translated by John E. Hall. In The American law journal, Volume II (1809), pp. 385–391, Volume III (1810), pp. 1–13.

- The good customs of the sea (1874). By British legal scholar Sir Travers Twiss (1809–1897). In Monumenta juridica: The Black book of the Admiralty, with an appendix, Volume III (1876), pp. 35–657. Rolls series, 55.

Contarini, Ambrogio. Ambrogio Contarini (1429–1499) was a Venetian nobleman, merchant and diplomat known for an account of his travel to Persia. Among his adventures was a meeting with Persian ruler Uzun Hassan.

- The journey of Ambrogio Contarini, ambassador of the illustrious signory of Venice to the great lord Ussuncassan, king of Persia, in the years 1473–1476, written by himself (1811). In A general history and collection of voyages and travels to the end of the eighteenth century (1811), Volume II, pp. 117–171. By Scottish writer and translator Robert Kerr (1757–1813).
- The journey of Ambrogio Contarini... (1873). In Travels to Tana and Persia (1873), by Giosafat Barbaro (1413–1494) and Ambrogio Contarini. Translated from the Italian by scholar and courtier William Thomas (died 1554) for the young Edward VI of England, and edited, with an introduction by Lord Stanley of Alderley (1827–1903). Issued by the Hakluyt Society, First series, Volume 49a.

Conti, Niccolò de'. Niccolò de' Conti (c. 1395 – 1469) was an Italian merchant, explorer, and writer, who traveled to India and other Asian destinations. His travels were used to help create the 1450 Fra Mauro map.

- The travels of Nicolò Conti in the East in the early part of the fifteenth century (1857), Translated from the original of Poggio Bracciolini (1380–1459), with notes, by John Winter Jones (1805–1881), Keeper of the Printed Books, British Museum. In India in the fifteenth century (1857). Translated into English, and edited, with an introduction, by English geographer Richard Henry Major (1818–1891). Issued by the Hakluyt Society, First series, Volume 22.

Coplas de Yoçef. Coplas de Yoçef. A Medieval Spanish Poem in Hebrew Characters (1935). Translated by Spanish literary scholar Ignacio González-Llubera (1893–1962). (cf. Spanish Wikipedia, Coplas de Yoçef)

Coptic texts. Coptic texts are among the body of writings in the Coptic language of Egypt, the last stage of the indigenous Egyptian language. They comprise mostly Christian texts dating after the 2nd century.

- Coptic and Greek texts of the Christian period (1905). From ostraca, stelæ, etc., in the British Museum, by H. R. Hall (1873–1930). A collection of Greek and Coptic texts reproduced from ostraca, from fragments of calcareous stone, and from commemorative stelæ and gravestones, preserved in the Department of Egyptian and Assyrian Antiquities in the British Museum. All were inscribed during the latter portion of the Coptic Period of the history of Egypt, between the 5th and 12th centuries.
- The Coptic manuscripts in the Freer Collection (1923). Edited by Coptic scholar William Hoyt Worrell (1879–1952).
- A Coptic wizard's hoard (1930). By William H. Worrell. In the American journal of Semitic languages and literatures, Volume XLVI (1930), pp. 239–262.
- Coptic magical and medical texts (1935). Edited and translated by William H. Worrell. In Orientalia, Nova series, IV (1935), pp. 1–37, 184–195.
- Coptic ostraca (1902). From the collections of the Egypt Exploration Fund, the Cairo Museum and others. The texts edited with translations and commentaries by Scottish coptologist Walter Ewing Crum (1865–1944), with a contribution by English scholar and liturgist the Rev. Frank Edward Brightman (1856–1932).
- Wadi Sarga: Coptic and Greek texts from the excavations undertaken by the Byzantine research account (1922). Texts from the 5th through 7th centuries presenting a picture of life at a monastery. Edited by Walter E. Crum and British papyrologist Sir Harold Idris Bell (1879–1967), with an introduction by British archaeologist Reginald Campbell Thompson (1876–1941).
- Varia coptica: texts, translations, indexes (1939). By Walter E. Crum. Literary and legal texts, letters, list and accounts from papyri and ostraca, published for the first time, with the exception of numbers 49, 53, 115 and 120.
- Coptic ostraca of the New York Historical Society (1928). By A. Arthur Schiller (1902–1977). In the Journal of the American Oriental Society, Volume XLVIII (1928), pp. 147–158. Of interest in presenting Egyptian life shortly after the 7th century Arab conquest.
- Egyptian tales and romances: pagan, Christian and Muslim (1931). Translated by British Egyptologist and orientalist Sir Ernest Alfred Wallis Budge (1857–1934). Christian tales translated from the Coptic include: (1) How Abbaton, angel of death, became king of mankind, by Timothy, archbishop of Alexandria; (2) Mysteries of St. John the Divine; (3) How Pisentius, bishop of Coptos, held converse with the mummies; (4) Story of Dorotheos and Theopisthe, by Theodosius, patriarch of Alexandria; (5) The story of Ketson, the merchant, as told by Severus, Patriarch of Antioch; (6) The story of the Lady Euphemia and the devil, as told by Eustathius, Bishop of Trake; (7) The history of Aur, the son of the magician Abrashīt by a queen; (8) The life of Onnophrios, the Anchorite, by Apa Papnoute (Paphnutius); (9) The Revelation of St Paul. St Paul's vision of the Judgement; (10) Apa Aaron and his miracles; (11) The story of the finding of the Cross, as told by Cyril of Jerusalem; and, (12) Adam describes the rebellion of Satan against God.

Coradinus Gilinus. The De morbo quem gallicum nuncupant (1497) of Coradinus Gilinus (1930). An early work on syphilis translated by Cyril Cuthbert Barnard. In Janus, Volume XXXIV (1930), pp. 97–116.

Cormac mac Airt. Cormac mac Airt was a High King of Ireland, who may have been an authentic historical figure, and whose reign is dated between the 2nd and 4th centuries.

- Works in Silva gadelica (I–XXXI), edited by Irish antiquarian Standish Hayes O'Grady (1832–1915). An edition of Silva gadelica that includes The panegyric of king Cormac (pp. 96–98); The birth of king Cormac (pp. 286–289); and The battle of Crinna (pp. 359–367). Page numbers refer to the translations in Volume 2. A retelling of the story of Cormac is found in The high deeds of Finn, and other bardic romances of ancient Ireland (1923), by Irish writer Thomas Hazen William Rolleston (1857–1920).
- Toruigheacht Dhiarmuda agus Ghrainne: The pursuit after Diarmuid O'Duibhne and Grainne, the daughter of Cormac mac Airt, king of Ireland in the third century (1857). Edited by Standish H. O'Grady. A translation of The Pursuit of Diarmuid and Gráinne, a tale from the Fenian Cycle of Irish mythology. In Transactions of the Ossianic Society, Volume III.
- The Irish ordeals: Cormac's adventure in the land of promise, and the decision as to Cormac's sword (1891). Edited and translated by Celtic scholar Whitley Stokes (1830–1909). In Irische Texte mit Wörterbuch, 3rd series, Part 1 (1891), pp. 183–229.
- Esnada tige Buchet: The songs of Buchet's House (1904). Edited and translated by Whitley Stokes. In Revue celtique, XXV (1904), pp. 18–39, 225–227. The story of king Cormac's wooing. A rhymed version of this work is translated by Irish historian Mary Teresa Hayden (1862–1942) and found in Zeitschrift für celtische Philologie, Volume VIII (1912), pp. 261–273.
- Tecosca Cormaic: The instructions of king Cormac mac Airt (1909). Edited and translated by German Celtic scholar Kuno Meyer (1858–1919). Reprinted inTodd Lecture Series, 15. Maxims or proverbs attributed to Cormac, but probably compiled in the 9th century.
- Tochomlod na nDéssi: The expulsion of the Déssi (1901). Edited and translated by Kuno Meyer. In Y Cymmrodor, XIV (1901), pp. 101–135. A translation of the 8th century text The Expulsion of the Déisi.

Cormacán Eigeas. Cormacán Eigeas mac Maelbrighdhe (died 946) was Ollamh Érenn, chief poet to Muirchertach mac Néill, king of Ulster.

- The circuit of Ireland by Muircheartach mac Neill, prince of Aileach (1841). A poem written in 942 and translated by Irish language scholar John O'Donovan (1809–1861). In Tracts relating to Ireland (1841), Volume I. Published by the Irish Archaeological Society.

Cornish plays. The ancient Cornish drama (1859). Translations of the Ordinalia by British philologist Edwin Norris (1795–1872).

- Mount Calvary: or, The history of the passion, death, and resurrection of our Lord and Saviour Jesus Christ (1826). Written in Cornish (as it may be conjectured) some centuries past/interpreted in the English tongue in the year 1682 by Cornish antiquary John Keigwin (1641–1716). Edited by Cornish author Davies Gilbert (1767–1839).
- The passion (1860–1861). A Middle-Cornish poem transcribed and translated from a British Museum ms., Harl. N. 1782, by Celtic scholar Whitley Stokes (1830–1909). In Transactions of the Philological Society, 1860–1861, Appendix, pp. 1–100.

Corpre Cromm mae Feradaig. Three legends from Brussels manuscript 5100-4 (1905). Edited and transcribed by Celtic scholar Whitley Stokes (1830–1909). In Revue celtique, XXVI (1905), pp. 360–377. The first legend gives an account of the interviews between a bishop in Clonmacnois named Coirpre Crom (observed 899) and the soul of Maelsechlainn, son of Maelruanaid and grandson of Donnchad, who was overking of Ireland from AD 843 to AD 860, and fought valiantly against the Vikings. [Names and dates from Stokes' article.] The second legend tells how St. Ciaran of Clonmacnois replaced his head (rather unskilfully) upon a wicked Coirpre Crom who had been decapitated. The object is to show the benefits of confession and repentance, which saved Coirpre's head from the clutches of a demon [paraphrased from Stokes' article.]

Cort mantel. Influence of medieval upon Welsh literature: the story of the Cort mantel (1863). A translation of a 13th-century French poem of the times of King Arthur, concerning the chastity test. By English antiquarian and writer Thomas Wright (1810–1877). In Archaeologia cambrensis, 3rd series, IX (1863), pp. 7–40.

Cosmas Indicopleustes. Cosmas Indicopleustes (fl. 6th century) was a Greek merchant and later hermit from Alexandria who made several voyages to India during the reign of Justinian. His work Christian Topography contains some of the earliest and most famous world maps.

- Kosma aigyptiou monachou Christianikē topographia: The Christian topography of Cosmas, an Egyptian monk (1897). Translated from the Greek, and edited with notes and introduction by Scottish philologist John Watson McCrindle (1825–1913). Issued by the Hakluyt Society, First series, Volume 98.

Couldrette. Couldrette, also known as Coudrette (fl. c. 1500) was a French writer, author of a novel in octosyllabic verse devoted to the legend of the fairy Mélusine, legendary ancestor of the Lusignan family. Another version of the story was written by Jean d'Arras (fl. c. 1392), and both were believed to be based on an earlier piece by an unknown author. (cf. French Wikipedia, Coudrette)

- The Romans of Partenay or of Lusignen: otherwise known as The tale of Melusine (1899). Translated from the French of La Coudrette, written c. 1401. Edited from a unique manuscript in the library of Trinity College with an introduction, notes and glossarial index by British philologist the Rev. Walter William Skeat (1835–1912). In Early English Text Society, Original series, Volume 22.

Courtesy. Courtesy referred to manners, etc., that in the Middle Ages in Europe, was the behaviour expected of the nobility, compiled in courtesy books and other works.

- The Babees book: Early English Meals and Manners (1838). Translated and edited by English philologist Frederick James Furnivall (1825–1910). In Early English Text Society, Original Series, 32.
- Queene Elizabethes achademy (by Sir Humphrey Gilbert) (1879). Edited by F. J. Furnivall. A booke of percedence. The ordering of a funerall, &c. Varying versions of The good wife, The wise man, &c. Maxims, Lydgate's Order of fools, A poem on heraldly, Occleve on Lord's men, &c. With essays on early Italian and German books of courtesy, by William Michael Rossetti (1829–1919) and Eugen Oswald (1826–1912). In Early English Text Society, Extra Series, 8.
- Hali meidenhad, an alliterative homily of the thirteenth century (1866). Translated and edited by F. J. Furnivall (1825–1910) and Thomas Oswald Cockayne (1807–1873). In Early English Text Society, Original Series, 18. See also Clene maydenhod (1867).
- Caxton's Book of curtesye (1868). Printed at Westminster about 1477–1478 A.D. and now reprinted, with two ms. copies of the same treatise, from the Oriel ms. 79, and the Balliol ms. 354 (Richard Hill's Commonplace Book). Edited by F. J. Furnivall. In Early English Text Society, Extra Series, 3.
- The book of the courtier (1903). By Count Baldesar Castiglione (1478–1529), printed in 1528. Translated from the Italian by Leonard Eckstein Opdycke (1858–1914), with twelve portraits and fifteen autographs.
- Courts and camps of the Italian renaissance (1908). By B. Castiglione. With appreciations and annotations by Christopher Hare, pseudonym for Marian Andrews (1839–1929).

=== CR–CY ===
Craft of dying. The book of the craft of dying, and other early English tracts concerning death (1917). Taken from manuscripts and printed books in the British museum and Bodleian libraries, now first done into modern spelling and edited by Frances Margaret Mary Comper. With a preface by the Rev. George Congreve (1835–1918). Includes a translation of the mediaeval work De arte Moriendi (The craft of dying) and an abridgment by William Caxton; a chapter from the Orologium Sapientiæ, by Henry Suso; a chapter from the Toure of all Toures; a fragment from ms. Bod. 423; a chapter from The Form of Living, by Richard Rolle; and, The lamentation, or complaint, of the dying creature.

- Contemplations of the dread and love of God (1916). From ms. Harleian 2409 in the British Museum, a mystic treatise ascribed to an anonymous follower of Richard Rolle (c. 1500). Translated into modern English by Frances M. M. Comper.

Crescas, Hasdai ben Abraham. Hasdai ben Abraham Crescas (c. 1340 – 1411) was a Catalan-Jewish philosopher and a renowned halakhist (teacher of Jewish law).

- Crescas' critique of Aristotle: problems of Aristotle's Physics in Jewish and Arabic philosophy (1971). By Harry Austryn Wolfson (1887–1974).

Creton, Jean. Jean Creton (fl. 1386–1420) was a French historian and poet who served as squire to Charles VI of France.

- Translation of a French metrical history of the deposition of King Richard the Second (1824). Written by a contemporary, and comprising the period from his last expedition into Ireland to his death. From a ms. now preserved in the British Museum. Accompanied by prefatory observations, notes, and an appendix, with a copy of the original. By the Rev. James Webb. In Archaeologia, or, Miscellaneous tracts relating to antiquity, Volume XX (1824), pp. 1–423.
- An Examination of the Authorship of the Deposition and Death of Richard II attributed to Créton (1940). By Evan J. Jones. In Speculum, XV(4) (1940), pp. 460–477.

Crimthann mac Fidaig. The death of Crimthan, son of Fidach, and the adventures of the sons of Eochaid Muigmedon (1903). Edited and transcribed by Celtic scholar Whitley Stokes (1830–1909). In Revue celtique, XXVIV(1903), pp. 172–207. Tales of Crimthann Mór and the sons of Eochaid Mugmedón, from the Yellow Book of Lecan. Another version is from the Book of Ballymore, reprinted in Silva gadelica, by Standish H. O'Grady.

Cross legends (Holyrood). The Holyrood is a Christian relic alleged to be part of the True Cross on which Jesus died. Saint Margaret of Scotland (c. 1045 – 1093) is said to have moved the relic from Waltham Abbey to Holyrood Abbey.

- Legends of the holy rood: Symbols of the passion and cross-poems (1871). In Middle English of the 11th, 14th and 15th centuries. Edited from mss. in the British Museum and Bodleian libraries. With introduction, translations, and glossarial index, by English philologist Richard Morris (1833–1894). In Early English Text Society, Originalseries, Volume 46. Only Discovery of the Holy Cross and the Uplifting of the Holy Rood have been translated, with the others remaining in the original.
- History of the holy rood-tree (1894). A 12th-century version of the cross legend, with notes on the orthography of the Ormulum (with a facsimile) and a Middle English Compassio Mariae (Feast of the Sorrows and Sorrows of Mary under the Cross). By Arthur Sampson Napier (1853–1916). In Early English Text Society, Original series, Volume 103.
- The Ruthwell cross, Northumbria. From about AD 680, with its runic verses by Caedmon, and Caedmon's complete cross-lay, "The Holy Rood, a dream" from a south-English transcript of the 10th century (1866). With translations, comments and facsimile-plates by English archeologist and philologist George Stephens (1813–1895). An account of the Ruthwell cross that includes the poem Dream of the Rood, once attributed to Cædmon or Cynewulf, and whose authorship is now unknown.

Crusades. Translations of works concerning the Crusades are extensively covered elsewhere, and representative works are presented below.

- Crusades (Bibliography and Sources) (1908). A concise summary of the historiography of the Crusades. In the Catholic Encyclopedia, by French historian Louis R. Bréhier (1869–1951).
- Bibliothèque des Croisades, 4 volumes (1829). Bibliography of works on the Crusades by French historians Joseph François Michaud (1767–1839) and Joseph Toussaint Reinaud (1795–1867).
- Translations and Reprints from the Original Sources of History (1901). A collection published by the University of Pennsylvania that includes in Volume I articles by American historian Dana Carleton Munro (1866–1933) on Urban II, letters from the Crusaders and the Fourth Crusade.
- The Crusades: a documentary survey (1962). Translations (various translators) from original documentary accounts of the times woven together with narrative introductions, edited by American medieval historian James Arthur Brundage. Includes over 100 translations of original Latin sources, the work of William of Tyre, and others. With a complete bibliography.
- Gesta Francorum et aliorum Hierosolimitanorum (1967). An edition of the anonymous Gesta Francorum, an account of the First Crusade, edited and translated by Rosalind Hill. Latin text with facing-page English translation.
- History of the journey to Jerusalem (2013), by Albert of Aachen (Aix) (died after 1150). Volume I: The First Crusade 1095–1099. Volume II: The Early History of the Latin States 1099–1119. Translated by British historian Susan B. Edgington. In Crusader Texts in Translation, Volumes 24 and 25.
- The chronicle of Ibn al-Athīr for the crusading period from al-Kāmil fīʾl-taʾrīkh (2005–2008). By Ali ibn al-Athir(1160–1233). Volume I: The Years 491–541/1097–1146. The Coming of the Franks and the Muslim Response. Volume II: The Years 541–589/1146–1193. The Age of Nur al-Din and Saladin. Volume III: The Years 589–629/1193–1231. The Ayyūbids after Saladin and the Mongol Menace. Translated by Donald S. Richards. In Crusader Texts in Translation, Volumes 13, 15 and 17.
- The Crusade of Richard I, 1189–1192 (1889). A history of the Third Crusade from 1189 to 1192, in particular, the role of Richard I of England. By English historians Thomas Andrew Archer (1853–1905) and Charles Lethbridge Kingsford (1862–1926). A detailed chronology with excerpts from Itinerarium Regis Ricardi and works by Ambroise of Normandy (fl. 1190), Roger of Howden (fl. 1174–1201), Ralph of Coggeshall (died after 1227), Ralph de Diceto (1120–1202), Roger of Wendover (died 1236), Matthew Paris (1200–1259), ibn al-Athir (1160–1233) and Bar Hebraeus (1226–1286). With interesting appendices on such diverse subjects as coinage, medieval warfare, the Assassins and the Old Man in the Mountain, beards, Arabic speaking among Crusaders, beheading of the dead. Illustrations of various war engines of the time.
- The conquest of Constantinople (1936). Translated from the old French work La Conquête de Constantinople of Robert de Clari (died after 1216), by American medieval historian Edgar Holmes McNeal (1874–1955).
- Memoirs of the Crusades (1955). Includes the chronicle De la Conquête de Constantinople of Geoffrey of Villehardouin and Life of Saint Louis by Jean de Joinville (1224–1317). Translation by British biographer Frank Thomas Marzials (1840–1912).
- The Crusades, A.D. 1095–1261 (1869). Excerpts from Edward Gibbon's History of the Decline and Fall of the Roman Empire (1776–1789). Additions on chivalry by English historian Henry Hallam (1777–1859). With an essay on chivalry and romance by Scottish novelist Sir Walter Scott and a discussion of the siege of Rhodes in 1480 through the translation of Gulielmus Caoursin's Obsidionis Rhodiæ urbis descriptio (1490) by English poet John Caius.
- The crusade of Richard I, 1189-92 (1900). Extracts from the Itinerarium Ricardi, Bohãadin, Ernoul, Roger of Howden, Richard of Devizes, Rigord, Ibn Alathãir, Li Livres, Eracles, etc. Selected and arranged by Thomas Archer.

Crusades, biographies. Biographies (to include eyewitness accounts) of major participants in the Crusades include those of pope Urban II, Crusader leaders Godfrey of Bouillon, Richard the Lionheart, and Louis IX of France, the Ayyubid sultan Saladin, and Byzantine emperor Alexius I Comnenus. Many of these are found (in their French translations) in the Recueil des historiens des croisades (RHC), the first comprehensive collection of original sources of the Crusades.

- The speech of Pope Urban II at Clermont, 1095 (1906). By American historian Dana Carleton Munro (1866–1933). Translations of original accounts of the Council of Clermont, led by Urban II. These original sources are found in RHC Historiens occidentaux, Volume 3 (1886).
- The First Crusade: the accounts of eye-witnesses and participants (1921). By August Charles Krey (1887–1961).
- Godeffroy of Boloyne: The siege and conqueste of Jerusalem (1893). By William of Tyre (c. 1130 – 1186). Translated from the French by English printer and writer William Caxton and printed by him in 1481. Edited from the copy in the British museum, with introduction, notes, vocabulary, and indexes, by Mary Noyes Colvin. Taken from a French translation of William's Historia rerum in partibus transmarinis gestarum (History of Deeds Done Beyond the Sea); in RHC Historiens occidentaux, Volume 1 (1884). In Early English Text Society, Extra series, Volume 64.
- Godfrey of Bulloigne; or, The recovery of Jerusalem (1818). By English translator Edward Fairfax (c. 1580 –1635). The first complete English translation of La Gerusalemme liberata, by Italian poet Torquato Tasso (1544–1595). The work is a reinvention of the First Crusade, with Godfrey of Bouillon lionized as the ideal military leader, using both the 1464 work of Benedetto Accolti, De Bello a Christianis contra Barbaros, and other available original sources. In RHC Historiens occidentaux, Volume 5.XI (1895)
- The Alexiad (1928). By Anna Comnena. Translated by Elizabeth A. S. Dawes (1864–1954). (The Alexiad, Wikisource). In RHC Historiens grecs, Volume 1.II (1875).
- Count Raymond of Toulouse (1915). By American historian Harry Neal Baum (1889–1967), the third son of L. Frank Baum. A biography of Raymond IV of Toulouse.
- The life of Saladin (1897). By Arab historian and friend of Saladin's Baha ad-Din ibn Shaddad (1145–1234). Edited and translated by British archaeologist Charles W. Wilson (1836–1905), with annotations by Claude Reignier Conder (1848–1910), an English soldier, explorer and antiquarian. Part of the library of the Palestine Pilgrims' Text Society, Volume XIII and RHC Historiens orientaux, Volume 3 (1884).
- Chronicles of the Crusades (1848). Two contemporaneous narratives of the Crusade of Richard Coeur de Lion, by Richard of Devizes and by Geoffrey de Vinsauf; and one of the Crusade at Saint Louis, by French chronicler Jean de Joinville (1224–1317). Edited and translated by Thomas Johnes (1748–1816), an English politician, farmer, printer, writer and translator.
- The chronicle of Richard of Devizes: concerning the deeds of Richard the First, King of England (1841). The Chronicon de rebus gestis Ricardi Primi (1192) of Richard of Devizes, translated and edited by English historian John Allen Giles (1808–1884).
- Memoirs of the Crusades (1955). Translation by British biographer Sir Frank Thomas Marzials (1840–1912). Consists of the chronicle De la Conquête de Constantinople of Geoffrey of Villehardouin and Life of Saint Louis by Jean de Joinville, who had accompanied Louis IX of France on the Seventh Crusade and Eighth Crusade.

Cuanu mac Ailchine. Mór of Munster and the Violent Death of Cuanu son of Cailchine (1912). Edited and translated by Thomas P. O'Nolan. In the Proceedings of the Royal Irish Academy, Volume XXX, Section C: Archæology, Linguistic and Literature (1912–1913), pp. 261–282. Text mainly from the Book of Leinster, telling of Mór Muman and the killing of Caunu by Lonán mac Findig, brother-in-law to Mór.

Cuchulain cycle. Collections of tales of Cú Chulainn (Cuchulain) who was an Irish mythological demigod who appears in the stories of the Ulster Cycle. He is believed to be an incarnation of the Irish god Lugh, who is also his father.

- Ancient Irish tales (1936). By Tom Peete Cross (1879–1951) and Clark Harris Stover. Includes the following stories from the Ulster cycle: The birth of Conchobar; The birth of Cu Chulainn; The boyhood deeds of Cu Chulainn; The wooing of Emer; The tragic death of Connla; The sick-bed of Cu Chulainn; The story of Mac Datho's pig; The debility of the Ulstermen; The cattle-raid of Regamna; The intoxication of the Ulstermen; The exile of the sons of Usnech; The adventures of Nera; Bricriu's feast; The cattle-raid of Cooley; The tragic death of Cu Roi Mac Dairi; Death tales of the Ulster heroes; The phantom chariot of the Cu Chulainn.
- Táin bó Cúailnge: The cattle raid of Cualnge (1904). An old Irish prose-epic, Táin bó Cúailnge, translated from Leabhar na hUidhre and the Yellow Book of Lecan by Lucy Winifred Faraday (born 1872).
- Anecdota from the Stowe ms. no. 992 (1884). By German Celtic scholar Kuno Meyer (1858–1919). In Revue celtique, VI (2) (1883–1885), pp. 173–186. From the Stowe manuscripts.
- The Cuchullin saga in Irish literature: being a collection of stories relating to the hero Cuchullin (1898). Translated from the Irish by various scholars. Compiled and edited with introduction and notes by Eleanor Henrietta Hull (1860–1935).
- The death-tales of the Ulster heroes (1906). Edited and translated by Kuno Meyer. In the Todd Lecture Series, 14 (1906).
- Heroic romances of Ireland (1905–1906) Translated into English prose and verse, with preface, special introductions and notes by Arthur Herbert Leahy (1857–1928).

Cuchulain tales. Individual tales of Cú Chulainn (Cuchulain). See also Ulster cycle and Táin bó Cúailnge.

- The coming of Cuculain, a romance of the heroic age of Ireland (1894). By Irish antiquarian Standish Hayes O'Grady (1832–1915).
- Death of Conchobar (1861). In Lectures on the manuscript materials of ancient Irish history (1861), by Irish philologist and antiquary Eugene O'Curry (1796–1862). An account of the death of Conchobar mac Nessa, brother of Deichtine, mother of Cuchulain. Also in The death-tales of the Ulster heroes, Todd Lecture Series, 14 (1906).
- Cúchulainn's death (1877). By German Celtic scholar Kuno Meyer (1858–1919). In Revue celtique, III (2) (1876–1878), pp. 175–185. Abridged from the Book of Leinster.
- The death of Conla (1904). Edited and translated by Kuno Meyer. In Ériu, Volume I (1904), pp. 113–121. The tale of the death of Connla, son of the Ulster champion Cú Cuchulain and the Scottish warrior woman Aífe.
- The tragic death of Cúrói mac Dári (1905). Edited and translated by Irish scholar Richard Irvine Best (1872–1959). In Ériu, II (1905), pp. 18–35. The story of the death of Cúrói at the hands of his wife's lover, Cuchulain, from the Yellow Book of Lecan. A poem on this subject, Brinna Fercherne, has been translated by Kuno Meyer in Zeitschrift für celtische Philologie, Volume III (1901).
- The violent deaths of Goll and Garb (1893). Edited and transcribed by Celtic scholar Whitley Stokes (1830–1909). In Revue celtique, XIV (1893), pp. 396–449.
- Cophur in dá muccida: The begetting of the two swineherds (1897). In The voyage of Bran, son of Febal, to the land of the living (1895–1897), Volume II, pp. 58–66. By Kuno Meyer.
- Echtra Nerai: The adventures of Nera (1889). By Kuno Meyer. In Revue celtique, X (1889), pp. 212–228. One of the tales prefatory to Táin Bó Cúailnge. Another translation can be found in The works of Morris and of Yeats in relation to early saga literature (1937), by Dorothy Mackenzie Hoare.
- Fled Bricrend, the feast of Bricriu (1899). An early Gaelic saga, transcribed by older mss. into the Book of the Dun Cow, by Moelmuiri mac mic Cuinn na m-Bocht of the community of the Clonmacnois. With conclusion from Gaelic ms. XL. Edinburgh Advocates' Library. Edited, with translation, introduction and notes by Scottish Gaelic scholar George Henderson (1866–1912). In Irish Texts Society, 2. The conclusion of the story, Cennach ind Rúanado, or The bargain of the strong man, is found in Revue celtique, XIV (1893), pp. 450–459, by Kuno Meyer.
- Foglaim Conculaind: The training of Cúchulainn (1908). Translated and edited by Whitley Stokes. Revue celtique, XXIX (1908), pp. 109–152, 312–314.
- Forbais Etair: The siege of Howth (1887). A story of legendary Irish poet Athirne, translated and edited by Whitley Stokes. Revue celtique, VIII (1887), pp. 47–64.
- Goire Conaill Chernaig i Crúachain ocus aided Ailella ocus Conaill Chernaig: The cherishing of Conall Chernach and the death of Aidill and Conall Chernaig (1897). Edited and translated by Kuno Meyer in Zeitschrift für celtische Philologie, Volume I (1897), pp. 102–111.
- Immaccallam in dà Thuarad: The colloquy of the two sages (1905). Edited and translated by Whitley Stokes. In Revue celtique, XXVI (1905), pp. 4–64. The colloquy takes place during the time of Conchobar and Cuchulain, but has nothing to do with them.
- Longes mac nUsnig: Deirdre, or the lamentable fate of the sons of Usnach (1808). An ancient dramatic Irish tale, one of the three tragic stories of Erin. Literally translated into English from an original Gaelic manuscript by Theophilus O'Flanagan (c. 1762 – 1814). In the Transactions of the Gaelic Society of Dublin, Volume I (1808).
- The exile of the sons of Usnach (1882–1884). Edited and translated by Eugene O'Curry. In Irisleabhar na Gaedhilge, Volume I (1882–1883), pp. 378–392, Volume II (1884–1886), pp. 10–17.
- The death of the sons of Uisnech (1887). Edited and translated by Whitley Stokes. In Irische Texte mit Wörterbuch, Volume II, part 2 (1897), pp. 109–184. From the Glenmason manuscript with an additional conclusion. Also found in a translation by Donald MacKinnon (1839–1914) in Celtic Review, Volume I (1904–1905), pp. 12–17, 104–131.
- Fate of the children of Usnach (1904). Taken from Cuchulain of Muirthemne: The story of the men of the red branch of Ulster. Arranged and put into English by Irish playwright and folklorist Lady Gregory (1852–1932).
- Scél mucci maic Dáthó: The Story of Mac Dáthó's Pig and Hound (1894). In Hibernica minora (1894), by Kuno Meyer. Anecdota Oxoniensia: Mediaeval and modern series, Volume VIII, pp. 51–64. Another version can be found in An early Irish reader (1927), by English philologist Nora Kershaw Chadwick (1891–1972).
- Saibur-charpat Con Culaind: The demoniac chariot of Cu Chulaind (1871). Edited and translated by J. O'Beirne Crowe. Journal of the Royal Historical and Archaeological Association of Ireland, Fourth series, Volume I (190–1871), pp. 371–448. From Leabhar na hUidre.
- The Fight of Ferdiad and Cuch ulaind, an episode from the ancient tale of the Táin Bó Chuailgne (1873). From On the manners and customs of the ancient Irish (1873), Volume III, pp. 413–463. By Irish philologist and antiquary Eugene O'Curry (1796–1862). Edited by William Kirby Sullivan (1821–1890).
- Táin bó Flidais (1904). An edition of Táin bó Flidhais (The cattle raid of Flidais) from the Glenmason manuscript, by Donald MacKinnon (1839–1914). In Celtic Review, Volume I (1904–1908), passim. The first section of this manuscript has part of Longes mac nUsnig, the remainder being the longer recension of the Táin bó Flidais. Certain passages omitted in the Glenmason manuscript but found in a 17th-century version of the work have been edited and translated by Margaret E. Dobbs in Ériu, VIII (1916), pp. 133–149.
- Táin bó Fráich (1890). Edited and transcribed by J. O'Beirne Crowe. In Royal Irish Academy, Irish manuscript series, (1890), Volume I, part 1 (1890), pp. 134–171. The spoils of the cows of Froech, one of the prefatory tales of the Táin bó Cúailnge, from the Book of Leinster.
- Táin bó Fráich (1903). Translated by Scottish historian Alan Orr Anderson (1879–1958). In Revue celtique, XXIV (1903), pp. 127–154.
- Táin bó Fráich (1937). Translated by Irish linguist Mary Elizabeth Byrne (1880–1931) and Myles Dylan. In Études Celtiques, Volume II, Fascicule 3 (1937).
- The geste of Fraoch and the death of Fraoch (1911). Translated by Scottish Gaelic scholar George Henderson (1866–1912). In The Celtic dragon myth (1911), by John Francis Campbell (1821–1885), pp. 1–32.
- Tochmarc Emire: The wooing of Emer (1888). An Irish hero-tale of the 11th century, translated by Kuno Meyer. In Archaeological review, Volume I (1888), pp. 68–75, 150–155, 231–235, 298–307. A translation from a different manuscript, The oldest version of Tochmarc Emire, also by K. Meyer, is found in Revue celtique, XI (1890), pp. 433–437. Tochmarc Emire is one of the stories in the Ulster Cycle of Irish mythology and concerns the efforts of the hero Cú Chulainn to marry Emer, who appears as his wife in other stories of the cycle, and his training in arms under the warrior-woman Scáthach.
- Tochmarc Ferbe: The courtship of Ferb (1902). An old Irish romance transcribed in the 12th century into the Book of Leinster, translated into English prose and verse by Arthur Herbert Leahy (1857–1928) and illustrated by Caroline Watts. Translated from the German version of Tochmarc Ferbe by E. Windisch in Irische Texte mit Wörterbuch, Volume III (1897)., pp. 445–558.

Cuigne mac Emoin. The alphabet of Cuigne mac Emoin (1928). By Roland M. Smith. In Zeitschrift für celtische Philologie, Volume XVII (1928), pp. 45–72. A collection of legal and proverbial maxims.

Cuimmin, Saint. Cuimmin's poem on the saints of Ireland (1896). By Celtic scholar Whitley Stokes (1830–1909). In Zeitschrift für celtische Philologie, Volume I (1896–1897), pp. 59–73.

Cuthbert. Cuthbert of Lindisfarne (c. 634 – 687) was an Anglo-Saxon saint of the early Northumbrian church in the Celtic tradition.

- The Life of Saint Cuthbert (1888). Written anonymously about the year AD 700 by a monk of Lindisfarne Abbey. With forty-five full-page illuminations from the Lawson ms., end of twelfth century. Edited by William Forbes-Leith (1833–1921).
- Two lives of Saint Cuthbert (1940). A life by an anonymous monk of Lindisfarne and Bede's prose life. Texts, translation, and notes by medieval historian, antiquarian and archaeologist Bertram Colgrave (1889–1968).
- The little book of the birth of St. Cuthbert, commonly called the Irish life of St. Cuthbert (1929). Translated by English historian Madeleine Hope Dodds (1885–1972). In Archaeologia Aeliana, Series 4, Volume VI (1929), pp. 52–94.

Cuthburga. Saint Cuthburga (died 725) was the first abbess of Wimborne Minster. She was the sister of Ine, king of Wessex and was married to the Northumbrian king Aldfrith.

- The marriage of St. Cuthburga, who was afterwards foundress of the monastery at Wimborne (1913). By the Rev. Canon James Michael John Fletcher (1852– 1940). In the Proceedings of the Dorset Natural History and Antiquarian Field Club, Volume XXIV (1913), pp. 167–185.

Cynewulf. Cynewulf was an Old English poet who flourished in the 9th century, with possible dates extending into the late 8th and early 10th centuries. He is one of twelve Anglo-Saxon poets identified in mediaeval sources.

- The poems of Cynewulf (1910). Translated into English prose by Charles William Kennedy (1882–1969). With an introduction, bibliography, and facsimile of the Vercelli Book.
- Andreas, or, The legend of St. Andrew (1899). An Old English poem known as Andreas attributed to Cynewulf. Translated by Robert Kilburn Root (1877–1950). In Yale Studies in English, Volume 7.
- Cynewulf's Christ: an eighth-century English epic (1892). Translated and edited by English historian and Shakespearian scholar Sir Israel Gollancz (1863–1930).
- The Christ of Cynewulf (1900). A poem in three parts: The Advent, The Ascension, and The Last Judgment. Translated into English prose by American scholar Charles Huntington Whitman (1873–1937).
- The Christ of Cynewulf (1909). A poem in three parts: The Advent, The Ascension, and The Last Judgment. A critical edition of Whitman's translation, edited with introduction, notes and glossary by American philologist Albert Stanburrough Cook (1853–1927).
- The Holy Rood, a dream (1866). A translation of the poem Dream of the Rood, once attributed to Cynewulf or Cædmon, by English archeologist and philologist George Stephens (1813–1895). In The Ruthwell cross, Northumbria (1866).
- The dream of the Rood: an old English poem attributed to Cynewulf (1905). Edited by Albert Stanburrough Cook.
- A literal translation of Cynewulf's Elene from Zupitza's text (1888). By Richard Francis Weymouth (1822–1902). A translation of Elene (Saint Helena Finds the True Cross), based on Cynewulfs Elene mit einem Glossar (1877) by German philologist Julius Zupitza (1844–1895).
- Elene: a metrical translation from Zupita's edition (1895). By Jane Menzies.
- The Elene of Cynewulf (1904). Translated into English prose by Lucius Hudson Holt (1881–1953). In Yale Studies in English, Volume 21.
- Translation of Cynewulf's Juliana (1905). By Herbert Spenser Murch. In The Journal of English and Germanic Philology, V (1903–1905), pp. 303–319. An edition of Juliana, an account of the martyring of St. Juliana of Nicomedia. The surviving manuscript, dated between 970 and 990, is found in the Exeter Book.
- The legend of St. Juliana (1906). Translated from the Latin of the Acta sanctorum and the Anglo-Saxon of Cynewulf, by Charles William Kennedy (1882–1969).
- The king of birds: or, The lay of the phoenix (1844). An Anglo-Saxon song of the tenth or eleventh century, translated into the metre and alliteration of the original, and communicated to the Society of Antiquaries by English archeologist and philologist George Stephens (1813–1895). An edition of The Phoenix, sometimes attributed to Cynewulf. In Archaeologia, or, Miscellaneous tracts relating to antiquity, Volume XXX (1854), pp. 256–322.
- The Old English Elene, Phoenix, and Physiologus (1919). Edited by Albert Stanburrough Cook. Includes the anonymous work Physiologus once attributed to Cynewulf.
- The Old English Physiologus (1921). Text and prose translation by Albert Stanburrough Cook. Verse translation by James Hall Pitman (born 1896). In Yale Studies in English, Volume 63. Three short poems of the Exeter Book: the Panther, the Whale, and the Partridge; often ascribed to Cynewulf. The last is a fragment. Text is extracted from the previous Cook's previous entry above, where a critical apparatus is found.

Cyprian and Justina. Cyprian and Justina are legendary saints of Antioch, who in 304, during the persecution of Diocletian, suffered martyrdom at Nicomedia.

- The martyrdom of Cyprian and Justa (1903). By American theologian and Biblical scholar Edgar Johnson Goodspeed (1871–1962). In Historical and linguistic studies in literature related to the New Testament, First series, Volume I, Part 2 (1903). Reprinted from the text and translation of the Ethiopic version in the American journal of Semitic languages and literatures, Volume XIX, Number 2 (1903), pp. 65–82.
- Cyprian and Justa (1900). Translated by oriental language scholar Agnes Smith Lewis (1843–1926). In Select narratives of Holy women (1900), pp. 185–203. Studia sinaitica, Volume X (1900). Original Syriac text in Volume IX.
- Acts of St. Cyprian (1927). Translated and edited by Edward Charles Everard Owen (1860–1949). In Some authentic acts of the early martyrs (1927), Chapter VII, pp. 93–99.

Cyprianus. Saint Cyprianus, or Cyprian (c. 210 – 258), was a bishop of Carthage and an early Christian writer.

- The genuine works of St. Cyprian, archbishop of Carthage (1717). With his life, written by his own Deacon Pontius. All done into English, from the Oxford edition. By Nathaniel Marshall (died 1730). With a dissertation on the case of heretical and schismatical baptism, at the close of the famous Council of Carthage, held in 256.
- Select epistles of St. Cyprian treating of the episcopate (1922). After the translation of Nathaniel Marshall. Edited with introduction and notes by Thomas Alexander Lacey (1853–1931)
- Selected works (1839–1844). Volumes III and XVII in the Library of fathers of the holy Catholic church (1838–1881). Translated by John Henry Parker.
- Selected works. Ante-Nicene Fathers, Volume V: Fathers of the Third Century.

Cyprus, History of. Excerpta cypria (1908). Materials for a history of Cyprus, translated and transcribed by British colonial official and historian Claude Delaval Cobham (1842–1915). With an appendix on the bibliography of Cyprus. For the medieval period, extracts from some twenty authors.

Cyrillus of Alexandria. Cyrillus of Alexandria, also known as Cyril, (c. 376 – 444) was Patriarch of Alexandria from 412 to 444.

- Selected works (1874–1885). Volumes XLIII, XLVII and XLVIII in the Library of fathers of the holy Catholic church (1838–1881). Translated by John Henry Parker.
- The Armenian version of Revelation and Cyril of Alexandria's Scholia on the incarnation and epistle on Easter (1907). Edited from the oldest manuscripts and Englished by British orientalist Frederick Cornwallis Conybeare (1856–1924).
- A commentary upon the Gospel according to S. Luke by S. Cyril, Patriarch of Alexandria (1859). Now first translated into English from an ancient Syriac version by Robert Payne Smith (1818–1895).
- The three epistles of S. Cyril (1872). With revised text and English translation. Edited by Philip Edward Pusey (1830–1880).

Cyrillus II of Alexandria. Cyrilus II of Alexandria, known as Cyril (died 1092), was Pope of Alexandria from 1078 to 1092.

- The canons of Cyril II, XLVII patriarch of Alexandria (1936). Translated by British Coptologist Oswald Hugh Ewart Burmester (1897–1977). In Le muséon, Volume XLIX (1936), pp. 245–288.

Cyrillus of Jerusalem. Cyrilus (Cyril) of Jerusalem ( c. 313 – 386) was a theologian of the early Church and bishop of Jerusalem.

- The catechetical lectures of S. Cyril (1845). Translated with notes and indices by Richard William Church (1815–1890), and an introduction by John Henry Newman (1801–1890). Library of fathers, Volume II.

== Source material ==
- A general history and collection of voyages and travels to the end of the eighteenth century
- American journal of Semitic languages and literatures
- American law journal
- Ancient Irish tales
- Anecdota Oxoniensia: Mediaeval and modern series
- Ante-Nicene Christian library. Works related to Ante-Nicene Fathers at Wikisource.
- Antiquarian repertory
- Archaeologia Aeliana
- Archaeologia cambrensis
- Archaeologia cantiana
- Archaeologia, or, Miscellaneous tracts relating to antiquity
- Archaeological review
- Bentley's miscellany
- Celtic Review
- Celtic Scotland: a history of ancient Alban
- Church historians of England
- Coptic manuscripts in the Freer Collection
- Crusader Texts in Translation
- Early English Text Society
- Early Sources of Scottish History, A.D. 500 to 1286
- Ériu
- Études Celtiques
- Everyman's Library
- Exeter Book
- The expositor
- Gnostic Society Library
- Hakluyt Society publications
- Hermathena
- Historical and linguistic studies in literature related to the New Testament
- India in the fifteenth century
- Influence of medieval upon Welsh literature
- Irish Ecclesiastical Record
- Irisleabhar na Gaedhilge. A Gaelic journal.
- Irische Texte mit Wörterbuch
- Irish Texts Society
- Jewish Historical Studies
- Journal of the County Louth Archaeological Society
- Journal of the American Oriental Society
- Journal of English and Germanic philology
- Journal of sacred literature
- Journal of the Royal Historical and Archaeological Association of Ireland
- Journal of the Royal Society of Antiquaries of Ireland
- Journal of the Royal Asiatic Society
- Lectures on the manuscript materials of ancient Irish history
- Le muséon
- Library of fathers of the holy Catholic church: anterior to the division of the East and West
- Loeb classical library
- Miscellaneous translations, in prose and verse, from Roman poets, orators, and historians
- Monumenta juridica: The Black book of the Admiralty, with an appendix
- Nicene and Post-Nicene Fathers: Series I (Wikisource)
- Online Books Library
- Orientalia
- Palestine Pilgrims' Text Society (PPTS), Library of
- Primitive Christianity reviv'd: in four volumes
- Proceedings of the Dorset Natural History and Antiquarian Field Club
- Proceedings of the Royal Irish Academy, Section C: Archæology, Linguistic and Literature.
- Proceedings of the Society of Biblical Archaeology
- Publications of the Modern Language Association of America
- Publications of the Scottish History Society
- Retrospective review, and historical and antiquarian magazine
- Revue celtique
- Romanic review
- Roxburghe Club Books
- Royal Irish Academy, Irish manuscript series
- Scottish gaelic studies
- Seanchas Ardmhacha: Journal of the Armagh Diocesan Historical Society
- Select historical documents of the Middle Ages
- Select library of Nicene and post-Nicene fathers of the Christian church, Second series. (Wikisource library).
- Selections from the Hengwrt mss. preserved in the Peniarth library
- Silva gadelica (I–XXXI)
- Speculum
- Studia sinaitica
- The golden legend; or, Lives of the saints
- The Month
- The works of John Hookham Frere in verse and prose
- The works of the British poets
- Todd Lecture Series
- Tracts relating to Ireland
- Transactions of the Gaelic Society of Dublin
- Transactions of the Ossianic Society
- Transactions of the Philological Society
- Transactions of the Royal Irish Academy, Antiquities
- Transactions of the Society of Biblical Archæology
- Translations and Reprints from the Original Sources of European History
- Tudor translations
- Ulster Journal of Archaeology
- University of Michigan Studies, Humanistic Series
- Yale Studies in English
- Y Cymmrodor
- Zeitschrift für celtische Philologie

== See also ==
- Anglo-Saxon literature
- Annals
- Arabic literature
- Islamic literature
- Medieval literature
- Mystery plays
