= Arthur Terry =

English philologist and translator (1927–2004)

Arthur Hubert Terry (17 February 1927 – 24 January 2004) was an English philologist, critic and translator, who was an expert in Catalan literature, and one of the best experts on Joan Maragall. He was Professor of Spanish at Queen's University Belfast (1962–73) and Professor of Literature at the University of Essex (1973–93).

== Biography ==
Terry was born in York in 1927 and studied at St Peter's school in the same city. In 1947, he got his philology degree at the University of Cambridge, where he was pupil of J. B.Trend. He came to Barcelona for the first time in 1949 through a grant in order to study early Catalan monasticism. From 1950 until 1972, he taught Hispanic languages and literatures at the Queen's University Belfast, where he was professor from 1962 until 1973 (succeeding Ignacio González-Llubera). Then he was appointed literature professor at the University of Essex in 1973; he remained in the chair until retirement in 1993. In 1976, he published an anthology of Ausiàs March's poems with English translations and coordinated a series of essays about Tirant lo Blanc. He was a great expert in modern Catalan poetry, and also in Spanish poetry. His study about Antonio Machado's Campos de Castilla in 1973 must be pointed out. His translations into English from Joan Brossa and Gabriel Ferrater must also be pointed out.

== Awards ==
He was president of the Anglo-Catalan Society from 1962 to 1965 and from the International Assotiation of Catalan Language and Literature from 1982 to 1988. In 1982, he received the Creu de Sant Jordi Award, in 1995 he received the Ramon Llull International Prize and in 2001 the Serra d'Or Critics Prize.

== Works ==
- La poesia de Joan Maragall (1963). (in Catalan)
- An Anthology of Spanish Poetry 1500-1700 (1968).
- Catalan Literature (1972).
- Quatre poetes catalans. Ferrater, Brossa, Gimferrer, Xirau (1992). (in Catalan)
- Modern Catalan Poetry: A European Perspective (1991).
- Seventeenth-Century Spanish Poetry: The Power of Artifice (1993).
- Readings of J.V. Foix: An Anthology (1998).
- Three Fifteenth-century Valencian Poets (2000).
- La idea del lenguaje en la poesía española: Crespo Sánchez Robayna y Valente (2002). (in Spanish)
- A Companion to Catalan Literature (2003).
