= Standish Hayes O'Grady =

Irish antiquarian

Standish Hayes O'Grady (Irish: Anéislis Aodh Ó Grádaigh; 19 May 1832 – 16 October 1915) was an Irish antiquarian.

== Early life and education ==
He was born at Erinagh House, Castleconnell, County Limerick, the son of Admiral Hayes O'Grady. He was a cousin of the writer Standish James O'Grady, with whom he is sometimes confused. As a child, he learnt Irish from the native speakers of his locality. He was educated at Rugby School and Trinity College Dublin.

== Career ==
Although qualified as a civil engineer, he is best remembered for Silva Gadelica (two volumes, 1892), a collection of tales from medieval Irish manuscripts. He was a friend of antiquaries John O'Donovan and Eugene O'Curry. In 1853, he became a founding member of the Ossianic Society. He would later become its president in 1855. In 1857 he moved to the United States where he remained for 30 years. In 1901 he contributed an essay on Anglo-Irish Aristocracy to a collection entitled Ideals in Ireland edited by Augusta, Lady Gregory.

== Death ==
He died in England in 1915. His Catalogue of the Irish Manuscripts in the British Museum was unfinished on his death and was completed by Robin Flower.

== Published works ==
- The Pursuit After Diarmuid, O'Duibhne, and Grainne, the Daughter of Cormac Mac Airt, King of Ireland in the Third Century (1857)
- The Pursuit of the Gilla Decair and his Horse
- The Colloquy with the Ancients
- Silva Gadelica (I.-XXXI.): A Collection of Tales in Irish with Extracts Illustrating Persons and Places; Volume 1 (1892)
- Silva Gadelica (I.-XXXI.): A Collection of Tales in Irish with Extracts Illustrating Persons and Places; Volume 2 (1892)
