= Silva Gadelica =

Medieval literature

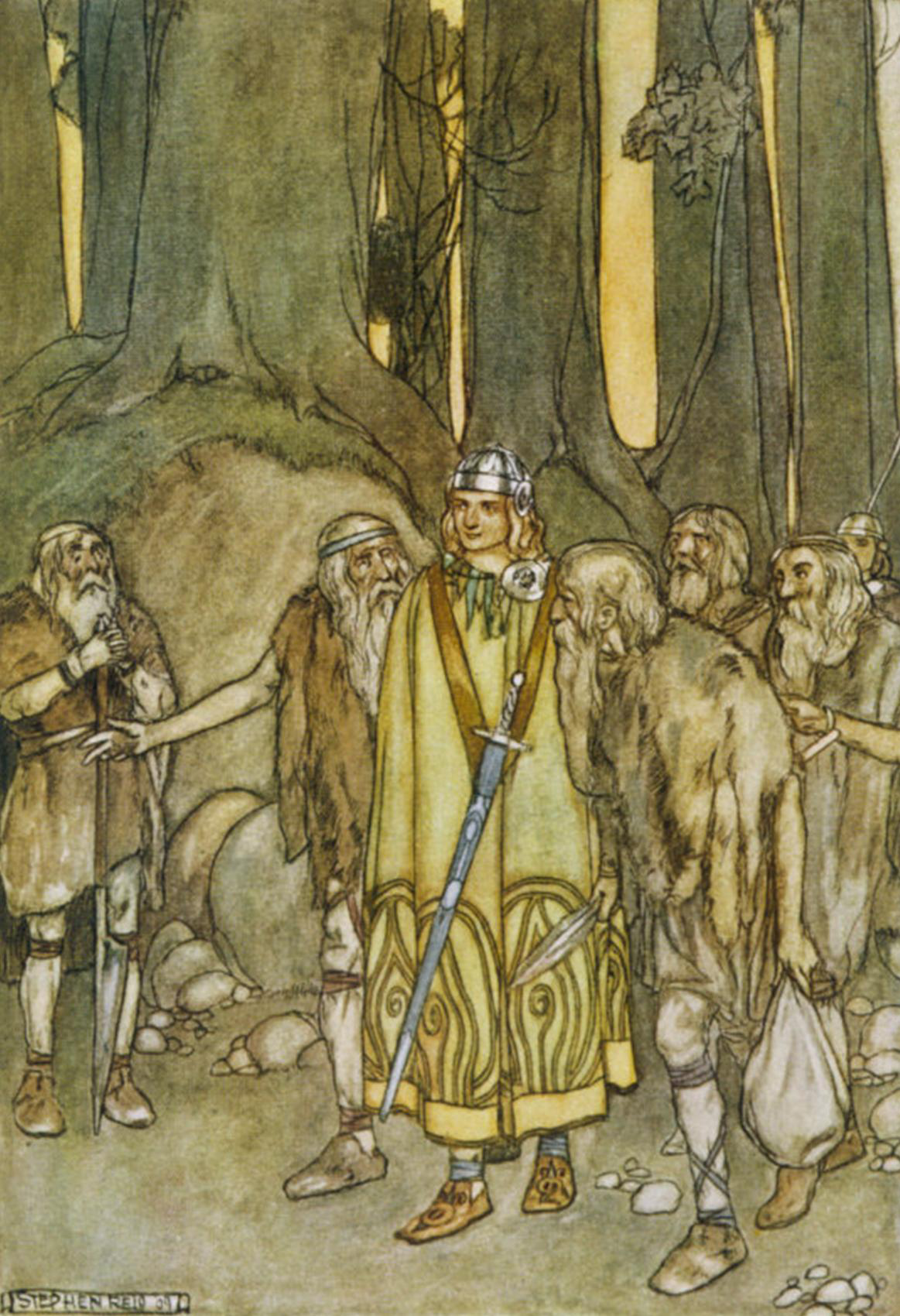
- A Fianna hero depicted in the Silva Gadelica, Fionn mac Cumhaill, meets the attendants of his father in the forest of Connacht, Ireland. Illustration by Stephen Reid.
- Author: Standish Hayes O'Grady
- Genre: Folktale
- Publisher: Williams and Norgate
- Publication date: 1892
- Publication place: United Kingdom
- Media type: Print (hardcover)

The Silva Gadelica are two volumes of medieval tales taken from Irish folklore, translated into modern English by Standish Hayes O'Grady and published in 1892. The volumes contain many stories that together comprise the Fenian Cycle.

== Contents ==
The Silva Gadelica contains two volumes, the first containing the medieval script and the second the English translations. The stories were translated from mostly vellum documents contained in the British Museum. When first published the Silva Gadelica included 31 tales and, in the second volume containing translations, over 600 pages of fine print.

The largest and most important translation in Silva Gadelica is of the Acallam na Senórach or "Colloquy of the Ancients".

== Reception ==
The Journal of the Royal Society of Antiquaries of Ireland described the volumes as containing "many passages of great beauty." Referencing the opening passage of the poem Caeilte's lay,

Cold the winter is, the wind is risen.

The journal writes that it "cannot recall any poem in the whole range of Irish literature more beautiful, or in which the subtle cadence of feeling peculiar to Irish expression is more perfect."

According to the Quarterly Review, O'Grady wrote the Silva Gadelica over a period of over 40 years. Further translations of Irish stories in the British museum were later completed by Robin Flower, effectively completing the project begun by the Silva Gadelica.

== See also ==
- Fianna
- Saint Patrick
- Irish Fairy Tales
- Fionn mac Cumhaill
