= Jacobus de Cessolis =

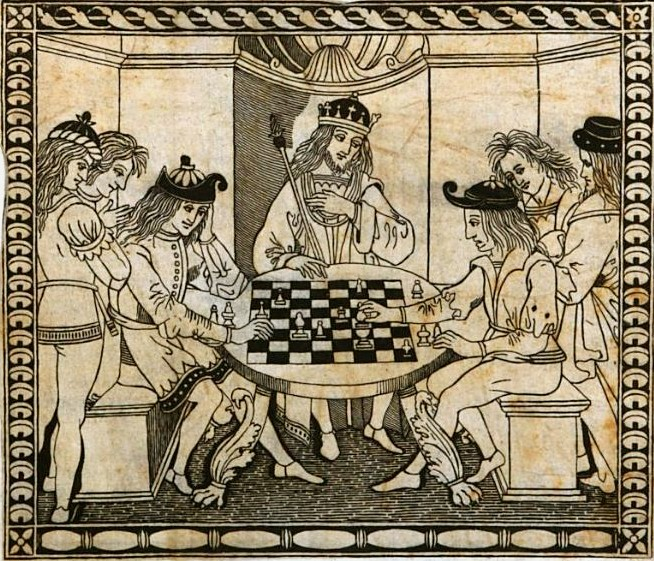
Illustration from Libellus de moribus hominum et officiis nobilium ac popularium super ludo scachorum

Jacobus de Cessolis (Italian: Jacopo da Cessole; c. 1250 – c. 1322) was an Italian author of the most famous morality book on chess in the Middle Ages.

In the second half of the 13th century, Jacobus de Cessolis, a Dominican friar in Cessole (Asti district, Piemonte, Northern Italy) used chess as the basis for a series of sermons on morality. They later became Liber de moribus hominum et officiis nobilium super ludo scacchorum ('Book of the customs of men and the duties of nobles or the Book of Chess'). The popular work was translated into many other languages and was first printed in Utrecht in 1473. Chess historian Harold Murray asserts that the popularity of the work rivaled "that of the Bible itself." The work was the basis for William Caxton's The Game and Playe of the Chesse (1474), one of the first books printed in English.
