= The Game and Playe of the Chesse =

Book by William Caxton

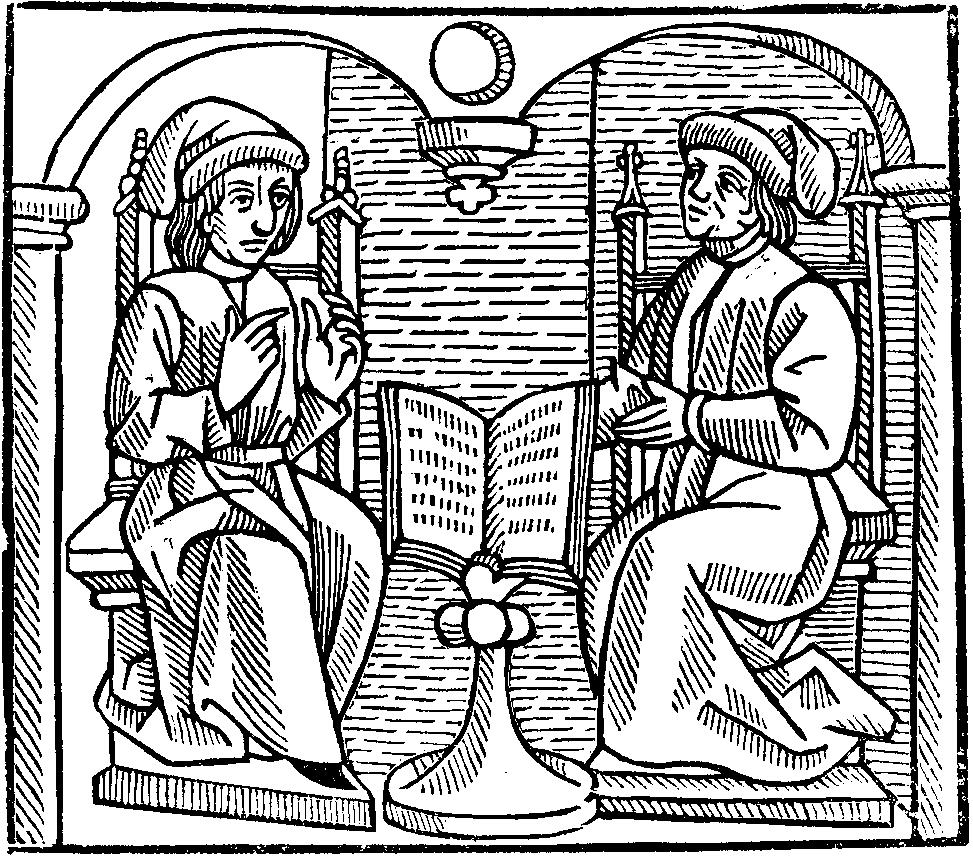
Depiction from The Game and Playe of the Chesse

The Game and Playe of the Chesse is a book by William Caxton, the first English printer. Published in 1476, it is one of the earliest titles published in English, the first being Recuyell of the Historyes of Troye, also by Caxton. It was based on a book by Jacobus de Cessolis. The book is an "allegory of fixed social structures where each rank has its allotted role."
