= O. H. E. Burmester =

British Coptologist

Oswald Hugh Ewart KHS-Burmester (1897 in Sandy, Bedfordshire – 22 November 1977 in Cairo) was a British specialist in Arabic Coptology. He is best known as the translator of most of the History of the Patriarchs of Alexandria.

In his later works he adds 'KHS' to his name; an abbreviation for the Greek χαζῆς (χ=KH : ς=S).

He was a former professor at Cambridge University. He was a follower of the Greek Orthodox Church.

He married a German woman, and so he was forced to leave England during the Second World War. He came to Egypt and worked first as teacher at 'El-eeman' school at Shoubrah, Cairo, then in various places. Finally he worked as a teacher of Greek and Coptic languages at the clerical college (Coptic seminary). He was also the librarian of the 'Societe d'Archeologie Copte', which is adjacent to 'El-botrossiah' (St Peter's) Coptic Orthodox Church at 222 Ramses Street, Cairo. He wrote many books on Coptology.

== Works ==
- Burmester, Oswald H.E. and Eugène Dévaud, Les Proverbes de Salomon Ch. 1, v. 1-14, v26*, Ch. 24, v. 24-v. 29 et v. 50*-v. 77 et Ch. 29, v. 28-v. 38 : Texte bohairique du cod. 8 de la Rylands Library, Manchester, du cod. 53 et 98 de la Bibliothèque vaticane et du cod. 1051 du Musée copte au Caire : Avec les variantes de ... autres manuscrits, et index des mots coptes et des mots grecs (Vienna, 1930).
- Burmester, Oswald H.E., Psalm-fragments from the Monastery of Saint Macarius in Scetis (Studia Orientalia Christiana. Aegyptiaca 37; Cairo, 1966).
- History of the patriarchs of the Egyptian Church : known as the History of the Holy Church / by Sawīrus ibn al-Muḳaffaʻ, Bishop of al-Ašmūnīn. Translated and annotated by Yassā ʻAbd al-Masīh an O. H. E. Burmester. 1943-
- History of the patriarchs of the Egyptian Church : known as the history of the Holy Church. Vol.3. Pt.1 Macarius II - John V (A.D. 1102 - 1167) / translated by Antoine Khater & O. H. E Khs-Burmester. 1968.
- History of the patriarchs of the Egyptian Church : known as the history of the Holy Church. Vol.3. Pt.2 Mark III - John VI (A.D. 1167-1216) / translated by Antoine Khater & O. H. E Khs-Burmester. 1970.
- History of the patriarchs of the Egyptian Church : known as the history of the Holy Church. Vol.3. Pt.3 Cyril II - Cyril V (A.D. 1235 - 1894) / Sawirus ibn al-Muqaffà, Bishop of el-Ashmunein, fl. 955-987; translated and annotated by Antoine Khater; O.H.E. Khs-Burmester. 1970.
- History of the patriarchs of the Egyptian Church : known as the history of the Holy Church. Vol.4. Pt.1 Cyril III, Ibn Laklak (1216-1243 A.D.) / translated by Antoine Khater & O. H. E Khs-Burmester. 1974.
- History of the patriarchs of the Egyptian Church : known as the History of the Holy Church. Vol.4. Pt.2 Cyril III, Ibn Laklak (1216 - 1243 A.D.) / translated by Antoine Khater & O. H. E Khs-Burmester. 1974.
- A Guide to the Monasteries of the Wadi 'n-Natrun 1954.
- A Guide to the Ancient Coptic Churches of Cairo. [With plates.] 1955
- Catalogue of the Coptic and Christian Arabic MSS Antoine Khater, O. H. E. KHS-Burmester. Vol. 1 : Preserved in the Cloister of Saint Menas at Cairo; Vol. 2 : Preserved in the Library of the Church of the All-Holy Virgin Mary known as Qasriat Ar - Rihan at old Cairo; Vol. 3 : Preserved in the Library of the Church of Saints Sergius and Bacchus known as Abu Sagah at old Cairo. 3 vol., 85-68-58. Cairo: IFAO (1967 - 1977)
- Die Handschriftenfragmente der Staats- und Universitätsbibliothek Hamburg. Teil 1: Coptic manuscript fragments from the Monastery of Abba Pisoi. Oswald Hugh Ewart KHS-Burmester. 1975. (3-515-01854-9)
- Die Handschriften der Staats- und Universitätsbibliothek Hamburg. Teil 2: Die Handschriften aus Dair Anba Maqar. Beschrieben Lothar Störk unter Verwendung der Aufzeichnungen von Oswald Hugh Ewart KHS-Burmester. 1995. (3-515-05073-6)

== Secondary sources ==
- In memoriam : Dr O.H.S. Khs BURMESTER. Le Monde Copte, vol. 5 p. 63
