= John Caius the Elder =

English poet

John Caius (fl. 1480), also known as John Kay and John Caius the Elder, was an English poet.

Kay was the English translator of the Siege of Rhodes, an account of the unsuccessful Ottoman assault on Rhodes in 1480. The original Latin text Obsidionis Rhodiæ urbis descriptio (1480) had been written by Gulielmus Caoursin, the vice-chancellor of the order of the knights of St John of Jerusalem and an eye witness to the siege. The English translation was printed c. 1481-84.

Kay dedicates his translation to Edward IV, as whose 'humble poete lawreate' he describes himself. But the expression does not necessarily imply that the writer held any official position at court. The dedication also refers to time spent abroad in Italy, possibly studying, but beyond this details of his biography remain unclear and debated.
