= Ignacio González-Llubera =

Spanish linguist, philologist and editor (1893–1962)

Ignacio Miguel González-Llubera (1893–1962) was a Spanish literary scholar, specialising in Judaeo-Spanish literature. Born in Barcelona, he was educated at the Colegio del Sagrado Corazón, the University of Barcelona (for his undergraduate degree) and the University of Madrid (for his doctorate in Semitic studies). He then studied in Madrid, Paris, London and Cambridge before he was appointed the first lecturer in Spanish at Queen's University Belfast in 1920. He was appointed its first Professor of Spanish in 1926, a chair he held until he retired in 1960.
