= List of English translations from medieval sources: B =

The list of English translations from medieval sources: B provides an overview of notable medieval documents—historical, scientific, ecclesiastical and literature—that have been translated into English. This includes the original author, translator(s) and the translated document. Translations are from Old and Middle English, Norman, Irish, Cornish, Scots, Old Dutch, Flemish Old Norse or Icelandic, Italian, Lombard, Latin, Arabic, Persian, Syriac, Ethiopic, Coptic, and Hebrew, and most works cited are generally available in the University of Michigan's HathiTrust digital library and OCLC's WorldCat. Anonymous works are presented by topic.

== List of English translations ==
=== BA–BE ===
Babees Book. The Babees Book (c. 1475), or the Lytyl Reporte of how young people should behave, is the first of a collection of treatises on the manners and meals of the English, published by the Early English Text Society. This was followed by a work under the title Queene Elizabethes achademy that also includes other essays on early English, Italian and German books of courtesy.

- The Babees book: Early English Meals and Manners (1838). Translated and edited by English philologist Frederick James Furnivall (1825–1910). In Early English Text Society, Original Series, 32.
- The Babees' book: medieval manners for the young (1923). Done into modern English from Dr. Furnivall's texts, by American medieval scholar Edith Rickert (1871–1938).

Bacon, Roger. Roger Bacon (c. 1219 – c. 1292), also known as Doctor Mirabilis, was a medieval English philosopher and Franciscan friar who placed considerable emphasis on the study of nature through empiricism. Bacon's major work was his Opus Majus.

- The Opus majus of Roger Bacon (1928). A translation by Robert Belle Burke (1868–1944).
- The mirror of alchimy, composed by the thrice-famous and learned fryer, Roger Bachon (1597). Also a most excellent and learned discourse of the admirable force and efficacie of art and nature, written by the same author, with certaine other worthie treatises of the like argument. An edition of The Mirror of Alchimy (Speculum Alchemiae). A translation by Tenney L. Davis. appears in the Journal of chemical education, VIII (1931), pp. 1945–1953.
- Medicina practica, or, Practical physick (1692). Containing the way of curing the more eminent and usual diseases happening to humane bodies: whereunto is annexed, 1. The preparation of the praecipiolum of Paracelsus; 2. The key of Helmont and Lully; 3. The opening of Sol and Luna. By English medical writer William Salmon (1644–1713), professor of physick.
- The errors of the doctors, translated by Mary Catherine Welborn (born 1899). In Isis, XVIII (1932–1933), pp. 26–62.
- Roger Bacon's letter concerning the marvelous power of art and of nature and concerning the nullity of magic, together with notes and an account of Bacon's life and work (1923). Translated from the Latin by T. L. Davis.

Bahira. Bahira (6th century) was a Christian Arab monk who, according to Islamic tradition, foretold to the adolescent Muhammad his future as a prophet.

- A Christian Bahira legend (1898–1903). Syriac and Arabic texts translated by Semitic scholar Richard James Horatio Gottheil (1862–1936). In Zeitschrift für Assyriologie und verwandte Gebiete, XIII-XV (1898–1900), XVII (1903), passim.

Bahya ben Joseph ibn Pakuda. Bahya ben Joseph ibn Paquda (c. 1050 – 1120 was a Jewish philosopher and rabbi from Al-Andalus. His principal work was Chovot HaLevavot (The duties of the heart) in Hebrew.

- The duties of the heart by Rabbi Bachye (1909). Translated with introduction by Edwin Collins.
- The duties of the heart, by Bachya ben Joseph ibn Paquda. Translated from the Arabic into Hebrew by Jehuda ibn Tibbon. Introduction and treatise on the existence and unity of God.With English translation by Hebrew scholar and rabbi Moses Hyamson (1862–1949). In The Jewish forum, III–VI (1920–1923).

Baidāwi, 'Abd Allāh ibn 'Umar al-. 'Abd Allāh ibn 'Umar al-Baidāwi, known as Qadi Baydawi (died 1319), was a Persian jurist, theologian and commentator on the Quran.

- Chrestomathia Baidawiana, the commentary of el-Baidāwi on Sura III (1894). Translated and explained for the use of students of Arabic by English orientalist David Samuel Margoliouth (1858–1940). A discussion of Sura III of the Koran, that of the family of 'Imram.

Baihaki, Abū 'l-Fadl Muhammad ibn Husain. Abu'l-Faḍl Muḥammad ibn Ḥusayn Bayhakī, known as Abu'l-Faḍl Bayhaqi (died 1077), was a Persian secretary, historian and author.

- Táríkhu-s Subuktigin of Baihakí (1869). In History of India, as Told by its Own Historians, The Muhammadan Period, Volume II, pp. 53–154. Translation of the first part by a munshi, and although said to have been revised, it required very extensive correction by the editor, British Indologist John Dowson (1820–1881). The second part translated by English historian Sir Henry Miers Elliot.

Baile suthain Sith Eamhna. A medieval Irish poem related to the Kingdom of the Isles, copied from an Irish manuscript written c. 1600. Collated with a copy contained in the Book of Fermoy translated c. 1457. Transcribed by William Maunsell Hennessy (1829–1889). In Celtic Scotland: a history of ancient Alban (1880), III, Appendix II, pp. 410–427. By Scottish historian and antiquary William Forbes Skene (1809–1892).

Bairre. Saint Finbar (in Irish, Fionnbharra, abbreviated to Barra or Bairre), (c. 550 – 623) was bishop of Cork and patron saint of the Diocese of Cork.

- The life of St. Finbar of Cork (1893). Translated by Patrick Stanton. In the Journal of the Cork Historical and Archaeological Society, II (1893), pp. 61–69, 87–94. Obtained by the Rev. P. Hurley from the Lives of the Irish Saints by Mícheál Ó Cléirigh (c. 1590 – 1643), one of the Four Masters, in the Burgundian Library, Brussels, In a short note at the end, the writer states that he wrote this Life of St. Finbar in the Convent of Friars, Cork, in June, 1629, and that he took it from a vellum book, the property of Daniel Dinneen.
- The life of Saint Fin Barre (1906). Translated and annotated by Colonel T. A. Lunham, from the Codex Ardmachanus. In the Journal of the Cork Historical and Archaeological Society, XII (1906), pp. 105–120.

Bakhaila, Mikā'ēl. Mikā'ēl Bakhaila (15th century), known as Zosimas. Author of Le livre des myster̀es du ciel et de la terre (Texte éthiopien).

- The Book of the Mysteries of the Heavens and the Earth, and other works of Bakhayla Mikael (Zosimas) (1935). Translated and edited by British Egyptologist and orientalist Sir Ernest Alfred Wallis Budge (1857–1934), with a foreword by R.A. Gilbert. An apocalyptic work believed to have been revealed by the Archangel Gabriel in the 15th century. Includes an explanation of St. John's apocalyptic vision, discourses on the Godhead and the Trinity, the birth of the Enoch, and Enochian magic.

Bakhtyār nama. The Bakhtyār nama (nameh), or Story of Prince Bakhtyar and the ten viziers. An example of Persian prose fiction in the form of a frame story and nine included tales related to the Sindibad stories. The earliest version of which seems to be by Šams-al-Dīn Moḥammad Daqāyeqī Marvazī (fl. c. 1200), a contemporary of Muhammad 'Aufī (1171–1242).

- The Bakhtyār Nāma: a Persian romance (1883). Translated from a manuscript text by Welsh orientalist Sir William Ouseley (1767–1842). Edited, with introduction and notes, by Scottish folkloristWilliam Alexander Clouston (1843–1896).

Bandamanna saga. The Bandamanna saga is one of the sagas of Icelanders, taking place after the adoption of Christianity in the year 1000.

- Bandamanna saga, or The story of the confederates (1882). In Summer travelling in Iceland (1882), pp. 205–229, by John Coles. Also translated are the sagas Þórðar saga hreðu (The Terror) and Hrafnkels saga (Frey's Priest).
- The story of the Banded-men, in Iceland: its scenes and sagas (1863), Chapter XVII, by English hagiographer and antiquarian, the Rev. Sabine Baring-Gould (1834–1924).
- The story of the banded men, the story of Howard the Halt; and the story of Hen Thorir (1891). In the Saga Library, Volume I (1891), by British translator William Morris (1834–1896) and Icelandic scholar Eiríkr Magnússon (1833–1913).

Baptista Mantuanus. Baptista Spagnuoli Mantuanus (1447–1516) was an Italian Carmelite reformer, humanist, and poet.

- The eclogues of the poet B. Mantuan Carmelitan, turned into English verse by George Turbervile, gent. (1567). Translation by English poet George Turberville (c. 1540 - before 1597), edited by Douglas Bush (1896–1983) in 1937 edition. Contains nine of the ten eclogues.
- The bucolicks of Baptist Mantuan in ten eclogues (1656). Translated out of Latine into English, by Thomas Harvey.

Barbaro, Giosofat. Giosafat Barbaro (1413–1494), also known as Josafa Barbaro, was a diplomat, merchant, explorer and travel writer.

- Travels to Tana and Persia, by Josafa Barbaro and Ambrogio Contarini (1873). Travelogue by G. Barbaro and Ambrogio Contarini (1429–1499). Translated from the Italian by William Thomas (died 1554), Clerk of the Council to King Edward VI, and by S. A. Roy, Esq. Edited, with an Introduction, by Henry Stanley of Alderley (1827–1903). Issued by the Hakluyt Society, First series, Volume 49a.

Barberino, Francesco da. Francesco da Barberino (1264–1348) was an Italian poet. (cf. Italian Wikipedia, Francesco da Barberino)

- Extracts from Documenti d'amore and Del regiment e dei costume delle donne (1869). Translated by English writer and critic William Michael Rossetti (1829–1919). In Queene Elizabethes achademy (by Sir Humphrey Gilbert) A booke of precedence (1869). Edited by English philologist Frederick James Furnivall (1825–1910). In Early English Text Society, Extra series, Volume 8. The first extract deals with table manners and the second is on the conduct of women and government.

Barbour, John. John Barbour (c. 1320 – 1395) was a Scottish poet, the first major named literary figure to write in the Scots language. His work The Brus is a narrative poem that provides a historic and chivalric account of the actions of Robert the Bruce and Sir James Douglas in the Scottish Wars of Independence.

- The Bruce, being the metrical history of Robert the Bruce, king of Scots, compiled A.D. 1375, by Master John Barbour (1907). Translated by George Eyre-Todd (1862–1937). See also discussion of popular versions and critical editions called "Barbour's Bruce" by the Rev. R. M'Kinlay in Records of the Glasgow Bibliographical Society, VI (1918), pp. 20–38.
- The Bruce of Bannockburn, being a translation of the greater portion of Barbour's Bruce (1914). By Michael Macmillan. A modernized version of the original prose.
- The Bruce; or, The book of the most excellent and noble prince, Robert de Broyss, king of Scots (1901). Compiled by Master John Barbour, archdeacon of Aberdeen, A.D. 1375. Edition from manuscript G. 23 in the library of St. John's College, Cambridge, written A.D. 1487; collated with the manuscript. in the Advocate's Library at Edinburgh, written A.D. 1489, and with Hart's edition, printed A.D. 1616. Edited with a preface, notes, and glossarial index, by British philologist Rev. Walter William Skeat (1835–1912). Published for the Early English Text Society, Extra series, Volumes 11, 21, 29, 55.
- Selections from Barbour's Bruce (1900). Books I–X, with the notes thereto, and the preface and glossarial index to the whole work of twenty books. As edited by the Rev. W. W. Skeat. Published for the Early English Text Society, Extra series, Volume 80a.

Bardaisan. Bardaisan, or Bar-daiṣān (154– 222), was a Syriac gnostic, founder of the Bardaisanites, and a scientist, scholar, astrologer, philosopher, hymnographer, and poet,

- The book of the laws of countries (1855). In Spicilegium Syriacum: containing remains of Bardesan, Meliton, Ambrose and Mara Bar Serapion (1855). by the Rev. William Cureton (1808–1864).
- The Book of the Laws of Divers Countries (1886). Revision of W. Cureton's translation by Benjamin Plummer Pratten. In Ante-Nicene Christian library (cf. Works related to Ante-Nicene Fathers at Wikisource), Volume VIII, the Fathers of the Third and Fourth Centuries.
- The hymn of the soul, contained in the Syriac acts of St. Thomas (1897). (cf. Apocrypha of the New Testament, Acts), is sometimes attributed to Bardaisan. Also known as the Hymn of the Pearl, it was e-edited with an English translation by British orientalist Anthony Ashley Bevan (1859–1933). In Texts and studies, contributions to Biblical and patristic literature, Volume 5, No. 3.

Bardason, Ivarr. Ivarr Bardason (or Bardarson, Bårdsson) (14th century) was a Norwegian cleric who was sent to Greenland in 1341 to serve as superintendent of the bishop's seat at Gardar in the Eastern Settlement of Greenland.

- A treatise of Iver Boty, a Gronlander (1625). Translated out of the Norse Language into High Dutch, in the yeere '1560. And after out of High Dutch into Low Dutch, by William Barentson of Amsterdam, who was chiefe Pilot aforesaid. The same Copie in High Dutch, is in the hands of Jodocus Hondius, which I have seene. And this was translated out of Low Dutch, by Master William Stere, Marchant, in the yeere 1608. for the use of me Henrie Hudson. William Barentsons Booke is in the hands of Master Peter Plantius, who lent the same unto me. Reprinted in Hakluytus posthumus (1906), Volume XIII, pp. 163–168, by Samuel Purchas (c. 1577 – 1626).
- A treatise of Iver Boty, a Gronlander (1625). Reprinted in Henry Hudson, the navigator: the original document in which his career is recorded (1860), by Georg Michael Asher. Issued by the Hakluyt Society, First series, Volume 27, pp. 230–235.
- The voyages of the Venetian brothers, Nicolò & Antonio Zeno, to the Northern seas in the XIVth century (1873). Comprising the latest known accounts of the lost colony of Greenland; and of the North men in America before Columbus. An account of the voyage of the Zeno brothers, edited with notes and an introduction by British geographer and map librarian Richard Henry Major (1818–1891). Issued by the Hakluyt Society, First series, Volume 50, pp. 39–54.

Barlaam and Josaphat. The legend of Barlaam and Josaphat (Joasaph) is a Christianized version of one of the legends of Buddha, and tells of an Indian king who persecuted his realm's Christians. When astrologers predicted that his son Joseph would become a Christian, the king imprisoned him, where met the hermit Saint Barlaam and converted to Christianity. After much tribulation the young prince's father accepted the Christian faith, turned over his throne to Josaphat. The story has been sometime attributed to 8th century monk John of Damascus. See the discussion in Barlaam and Ioasaph, by Robert Lee Wolfe, in the Harvard theological review, (1939), pp. 131–139

- The story of Barlaam and Josaphat (1900 ). In The golden legend; or, Lives of the saints (1483), Volume VII, pp. 84–105. As Englished by William Caxton (c. 1422 – c. 1491).
- Book of the king's son and the ascetic (1890). Translated by Hungarian orientalist Edward Rehatsek (1819–1891). In the Journal of the Royal Asiatic Society, (1890), pp. 119–155.
- The story of Barlaam and Joasaph (1890). In Christianity and Buddhism: a comparison and a contrast: being the Donnellan lectures for the year 1889–1890, pp. 136–193. A condensed translation by bishop Thomas Sterling Berry (1854–1931).
- The Parables of Barlaam and Joasaph (1891). By Robert Chalmers. In Journal of the Royal Asiatic Society, New Series, Volume 23 (1891), pp. 423–449.
- The story of Barlaam and Joasaph; Buddhism & Christianity (1895), Edited by K. S. MacDonald; with philological introduction and notes to the Vernon, Harleian and Bodleian versions, by the Rev. John Morrision.
- Barlaam and Josaphat: English lives of Buddha (1896). Edited and induced by Australian folklorist and historian Joseph Jacobs (1854–1916).
- The Barlaam and Josaphat Legend in the Ancient Georgian and Armenian Literatures (1896). By British orientalist Frederick Cornwallis Conybeare (1856–1924). In Folklore, Volume VII (1896), pp. 100–142.
- St. John Damascene: Barlaam and Ioasaph (1914). With an English translation by George Radcliffe Woodward (1848–1934) and Harold Mattingly (1884–1964), and introduction by D.M. Lang. Loeb Classical Library, Volume L.034.
- Baralâm and Yĕwâsěf, being the Ethiopic version of a Christianized recension of the Buddhist legend of the Buddha and the Bodhisattva (1923). The Ethiopic text edited for the first time with an English translation and introduction by British Egyptologist and orientalist Sir Ernest Alfred Wallis Budge (1857–1934).

Barnabas, Epistle of. The Epistle of Barnabas was written in Greek between AD 70 and 132. The work was attributed to Barnabas, the companion of Paul the Apostle, by Clement of Alexandria (c. 150 – c. 215) and Origen (c. 184 – c. 253). The complete text is preserved in the 4th-century Codex Sinaiticus, where it appears immediately after the New Testament.

- The epistle of Barnabas, from the Codex sinaiticus (1863–1864). In the Journal of sacred literature, New Series, IV (1893–1864), pp. 66–81, V (1864), pp. 103–113.
- The Epistle of Barnabas: from the Sinaitic manuscript of the bible (1880). With a translation by Egyptologist and Biblical scholar Samuel Sharpe (1799–1881).
- An English translation of the Epistle of Barnabas (1923). Crafer, T. W. (Thomas Wilfrid). (1920). Texts for Students, published by the Society for Promoting Christian Knowledge (SPCK).

Barsaumâ al-'Uryān. Barsaumâ al-'Uryān, known as Barsoum el-Erian, (1257–1317) was a legendary Coptic saint depicted on the walls of Saint Mercurius Church in Coptic Cairo.

- Barsaumâ the Naked (1907). A biography of Barsaumâ al-'Uryān in Arabic, edited and translated into English by Scottish Coptologist Walter Ewing Crum (1865–1944). In the Proceedings of the Society of Biblical Archaeology, Volume XXIX (1907), pp. 135–149, 189–206.

Bartholomaeus Anglicus. Bartholomaeus Anglicus (before 1203 – 1272), also known as Bartholomew the Englishman, was a member of the Franciscan order and a scholastic of Paris. He was best known from the prototypical encyclopedia De Proprietatibus Rerum, dated c. 1240.

- Mediæval lore from Bartholomaeus Anglicus (1893). An epitome of the science, geography, animal and plant folk-lore, and myth of the middle ages, being classified gleanings from the encyclopedia of B. Anglicus, by Robert Steele (1860–1944), with preface by William Morris (1834–1896). Translated by John Trevisa, chaplain to Sir Thomas, lord of Berkeley, in 1397.
- Batman uppon Bartholome, His Booke De Proprietatibus Rerum (1582). From description in HathiTrust: John of Trevisa's English translation made from the Latin original, and first published by Wynkyn de Worde (died 1534) about 1495. The Latin text was first published in Basle about 1470. cf. Dict. nat. biog. Many errors in foliation.
- Bartholomeus Anglicus De Proprietatibus Rerum (Book seventh: On medicine) (1933). Translated and annotated with an introductory essay by American physician James Joseph Walsh (1865–1942). In Medical life, XL (1933).

Bartolus de Saxoferrato. Bartolus de Saxoferrato (1313–1357) was an Italian law professor and a continental jurists of medieval Roman Law.

- Humanism and tyranny: studies in the Italian trecento (1925). By American historian and translator Epharim Emerton (1851–1935). Include two works of Bartolus: Tractatus de triennia and On Guelphs and Ghibellines.
- Bartolus, On the Conflict of laws (1914). Translated by American lawyer Joseph Henry Beale (1861–1943).

Basil of Caesarea. Basil of Caesarea (Basilius or Saint Basil the Great) (330– 379), was a Greek bishop of Caesarea Mazaca.

- The treatise De spiritual sancta, the nine homilies of the Hexaemeron and the letters of Saint Basil the Great, Archbishop of Cæsarea (1895). Translated with note by the Rev. Blomfield Jackson. In the Select library of Nicene and post-Nicene fathers of the Christian church (1895), Second series, Volume VIII.
- Bibliography of works by Basilius.

Basil I the Macedonian. Basil I (Basilius I, the Macedonian) (811–886) was an Armenian who was the Byzantine emperor who reigned from 867 to 886.

- The sixty sixe admonitory chapters of Basilius, King of the Romans, to his sonne Leo, in acrostick manner that is, the first letter of euery chapter, making vp his name and title (1638). Translated out of Greek by James (Iames) Scudamore (1624–1668).

Battle Abbey. Battle Abbey is a partially ruined Benedictine abbey built on the site of the Battle of Hastings of 1066 and dedicated to Saint Martin of Tours.

The chronicle of Battel Abbey, from 1066 to 1176 (1851). Now first translated, with notes, and an abstract of the subsequent history of the establishment, by English historian Mark Antony Lower (1813–1876).

Batman, Stephen. Stephen Batman (died 1584) was an English translator and author.

- Batman uppon Bartholome, His Booke De Proprietatibus Rerum (1582). Newly corrected, enlarged and amended: with such Additions as are requisite, vnto euery seuerall Booke: Taken foorth of the most approued Authors, the like heretofore not translated in English. Profitable for all Estates, as well for the benefite of the Mind as the Bodie. Original translation by John Trevisa, "of Bartholomew de Glanville, 'De Proprietatibus Rerum,' which he finished at Berkeley on 6 Feb. 1398, 'the yere of my lord's age 47.' This translation was printed by Wynkyn de Worde (died 1534), probably in 1495, and by Berthelet in 1535. Stephen Batman [q. v.] produced a revised version in 1582, with which Shakespeare was probably familiar."

Be domes daegu. Be domes dæge, De die judicii; an Old English version of the Latin poem ascribed to Bede (1876). Edited (with other short poems) from the unique manuscript in the library of Corpus Christi College, Cambridge, by English cleric Joseph Rawson Lumby (1831–1895). A Latin poem ascribed to Bede or Alcuin. In Early English Text Society, Original Series, Volume 65.

Beatrijs. Beatrijs is a poem written c. 1374) about the legend of a nun, Beatrijs, who deserted her convent for the love of a man. The Dutch poem was created out of a legend recorded in Latin, Dialogus Miraculorum (1219-1223) and Libri Octo Miraculorum (1225-1227) written by Caesarius von Heisterbach.

- Beatrijs, a middle Dutch legend (1914). Edited from the only existing manuscript in the Royal library at the Hague, with a grammatical introduction, notes and a glossary, by Adriaan Jacob Barnouw (1877–1968).
- The miracle of Beatrice: a Flemish legend of c. 1300 (1944). English-Flemish edition translated by A. Barnouw, with an introduction by Jan-Albert Goris (1899–1984), known as Marnix Gijsen.
- Beatrice: a legend of our Lady, written in the Netherlands in the fourteenth century (1909). Translated by Harold DeWolf Fuller. Reprinted in Schlauch, M. (1928). Medieval narrative: a book of translations (1928), by Margaret Schlauch (1898–1986).
- The tale of Beatrice (1927). Translated from the Dutch by Dutch historian Pieter Geyl (1887–1966).

Beckington, Thomas. Thomas Beckington (c. 1390 – 1465) was the bishop of Bath and Wells and King's Secretary to Henry VI of England.

- A journal by one of the suite of Thomas Beckington, during an embassy to negotiate a marriage between Henry VI and a daughter of the Count of Armagnac, A.D. MCCCCXLII (1828). With notes and illustrations, by English antiquary Sir Nicholas Harris Nicolas (1799–1848). The text is in English, French and Latin. The French and Latin are translated while the English is printed as originally written.

Bede. Bede (672/673 – 735), also known as the Venerable Bede, was an English Benedictine monk, well known as an author, teacher and scholar. His most famous work was the Ecclesiastical History of the English People.

- The complete works of Venerable Bede (1843–1844). In the original Latin, collated with the manuscripts, and various printed editions, accompanied by a new English translation of the historical works, and a life of the author. By English historian Rev. John Allen Giles (1808–1884).
- The historical works of Venerable Bede (1845). Translated from the Latin by J. A. Giles.
- The Venerable Bede's Ecclesiastical history of England: also the Anglo-Saxon chronicle (1847). With illustrative notes, a map of Anglo-Saxon England, and a general index. Edited by J. A. Giles,et al..
- Be domes dæge, De die judicii; an Old English version of the Latin poem ascribed to Bede (1876). Edited (with other short poems) from the unique ms. in the library of Corpus Christi College, Cambridge, by J. Rawson Lumby.
- List of works by Bede.

Bedershi, Jedaiah ben Abraham. Jedaiah ben Abraham Bedersi (c. 1270 – c. 1340), also known as Yedaiah Bedarsi, Rabbi Jadaia or, in Occitan, En Bonet, was a Jewish poet, physician, and philosopher.

- Behinath 'Olam (Examination of the World) (1806). A didactic poem in thirty-seven short sections, translated into English by Tobias Goodman.

Bega. Saint Bega (7th century) was reputedly a saint of the early Middle Ages, an Irish princess who valued virginity. Promised in marriage to a Viking prince who, according to a medieval manuscript The Life of St Bega, was "son of the king of Norway," Bega fled across the Irish sea to land at St. Bees on the Cumbrian coast. Bega is one of eleven mythical figures represented in the Dictionary of National Biography.

- The Life and Miracles of Sancta Bega, patroness of the priory of St. Bees in the county of Cumberland (1842). Written by a monkish historian and translated by George Cockaine Tomlinson. In Latin and English.

Benedict of Nursia. Benedict of Nursia (Benedictus) (c. 480 – c. 547) is a Catholic saint and a patron saint of Europe. Benedict founded various communities for monks before becoming abbot of Monte Cassino. He is best known for writing the Rule of Saint Benedict, a book of precepts for monks living communally under the authority of an abbot.

- The life and times of St. Benedict, patriarch of the monks of the west (1900). Abridged and arranged by O. S. B. from the German of Peter Lechner.
- Here begynneth the Rule of Seynt Benet (1517). Translated by Richarde Fox - 1517 (born 1447).
- The rule of Our Most Holy Father St. Benedict, patriarch of monks (1878). From the old English edition of 1638. Edited in Latin and English by one of the Benedictine fathers of St. Michael's near Hereford.
- The rule of St. Benedict (1892). In Select historical documents of the Middle Ages (1892), Book III, Number I. Translated and edited by Ernest Flagg Henderson (1861–1928).
- St. Benedict's Monastic Rule, about 500 A. D. (1907). In the Library of original sources (1907), Volume IV. Edited by Oliver Joseph Thatcher (1857–1937).

Benjamin of Tudela. Benjamin of Tudela, known as Benjamin ben Jonah (1130–1173) was a medieval Jewish traveler who visited Europe, Asia, and Africa in the 12th century.

- The peregrination of Benjamin, the sonne of Jonas, a Jew, written in Hebrew, translated into Latin by Benito Arias Montanus (1527–1598), discovering both the state of the Jewes, and of the World, about foure hundred and sixtie yeeres since (1905). In Hakluytus posthumus, Volume VIII, Chapter V, by Samuel Purchas (c. 1577 – 1626).
- The travels of Rabbi Benjamin, son of Jonas of Tudela, through Europe, Asia and Africa, from Spain to China. In Navigantium atque itinerantium bibliotheca, or, A compleat collection of voyages and travels (1705), by English writer and scientist John Harris (c. 1666 – 1719). Revised edition (1744) edited by Scottish author John Campbell (1708–1775).
- The travels of Rabbi Benjamin, son of Jonas of Tudela, through Europe, Asia and Africa, from Spain to China. In A general collection of the best and most interesting voyages and travels in all parts of the world, Volume VII, pp. 1–21 (1811). Translated by Scottish antiquary John Pinkerton (1758–1826).
- Travels of Rabbi Benjamin from Spain to China, in the Twelfth Century, in A general history and collection of voyages and travels to the end of the eighteenth century (1811), Volume I, Chapter V, by Scottish writer and translator Robert Kerr (1757–1813).
- The itinerary of Rabbi Benjamin of Tudela (1840–1841). Translated and edited by Adoph Asher (1800–1853).
- The itinerary of Benjamin of Tudela (1904). Critical text, commentary and translation by Marcus Nathan Adler (1837–1911). In the Jewish Quarterly Review: XVI (1904), pp. 453–473; XVII(1) (1904), pp. 123–141; XVII(2) (1905), pp. 286–306; XVII(3) (1905), pp. 514–530; XVII(4) (1905), pp. 762–781; XVIII(1) (1905), pp. 84–101.

Benno. Saint Benno (c. 1010 – 1106) was bishop of Meissen.

- Lyfe of Hyldebrande, called Gregory, the VII pope of that name, in A mustre of scismatyke bysshoppes of Rome (1534). By Thomas Swinnerton (died 1554).

Benoît de Sainte-More. Benoît de Sainte-More, or Sainte-Maure (died 1173), was a 12th-century French poet. A major work, Chronique des ducs de Normandie (1180–1200), has been attributed to Benoît, but that is disputed, and the work remains untranslated.

- The story of Troilus: as told by Benoǐt de Saint-Maure, Giovanni Boccaccio, Geoffrey Chaucer [and] Robert Henryson (1934). Translations and introduction by Robert Kay (R. K.) Gordon (1887–1973). A set of interrelated stories based on the author's Le Roman de Troie, Chaucer's Troilus and Criseyde, Boccaccio's Il Filostrato, and The Testament of Cresseid by Robert Henryson.

Beowulf. Beowulf is an Old English epic poem in the tradition of Germanic heroic legend and is one of the most important and most often translated works of Old English literature. It is known for the difficulty in translating Beowulf.

- The Anglo-Saxon poems of Beowulf, the travellers song and the battle of Finnesburh (1833). Edited [together with a glossary of the more difficult words and an historical preface] by English scholar and historian John Mitchell Kemble (1807–1857).
- Beowulf: an epic poem (1849). Translated from the Anglo-Saxon into English verse by Athanasius Francis Diedrich Wackerbarth (1813–1884).
- The Anglo-Saxon poems of Beowulf, the Scôp or gleeman's tale, and the fight at Finnesburg (1855). With a literal translation, notes, glossary, etc., by English scholar of Anglo-Saxon literature Benjamin Thorpe (1782–1870).
- Beowulf: a Heroic Poem of the Eighth Century (1876). With a translation, notes and an appendix, by English educator and historian Thomas Arnold (1823–1900).
- Beowulf: an old English poem (1881). Translated into modern rhymes by Liuet. Colonel Henry William Lumsden.
- Beowulf. In Gudrun, Beowulf and Roland with other mediaeval tales (1881), pp. 135–170. By John Gibb (1835–1915). Not a literal translation, but in simple language for young readers.
- Beowulf, an Anglo-Saxon epic poem (1897). translated from the Heyne-Socin text, by John Lesslie Hall (1856–1928).
- Beowulf and the Fight at Finnsburg (1901). By English scholar of Old English John Richard Clark Hall (1851–1931). See 1940 edition below.
- Beowulf; a metrical translation into modern English (1912). By John R. Clark Hall.
- Beowulf and The fight at Finnsburg (1922). Edited, with introduction, bibliography, notes, glossary, and appendices, by German philologist Frederick J. Klaeber (1863–1954).
- Beowulf and the Finnesburg fragment: a translation into modern English prose (1940). Translated with an introducation and notes by John R. Clark Hall. New edition revised by Charles Leslie Wrenn (1895–1969) and prefatory notes by J. R. R. Tolkien (1892–1973). The text translated is that of Fr. Klaeber.
- List of translations of Beowulf.

Berachya ben Natronai. Berechiah ben Natronai Krespia ha-Nakdan (fl. 12th–13th century) was a Jewish grammarian, translator, poet, and philosopher.

- The ethical treatises of Berachya son of Rabbi Natronai ha-Nakdan, being the Compendium and the Masref (1902). Translated and edited by Sir Hermann Gollancz (1852–1930), a British rabbi and Hebrew scholar.
- Dodi ve-nechdi (Uncle & nephew): the work of Berachya Hanakdan (1920). To which is added the first English translation from the Latin of Questiones Naturales (Questions on Natural Science) by English natural philosopher Adelard of Bath (12th century). Translated and edited by H. Gollancz.
- A commentary on the book of Job (1905). From a Hebrew manuscript in the University Library, Cambridge. Edited by English writer William Aldis Wright (1831–1914). Ascribed erroneously to Berechiah in the Encyclopaedia Judaica.

Berchán. Two Berchan's are noted. The first is Berchán, abbot of Glasnevin (fl. 461–521). The second is Saint Berchán of Clúain Sosta (8th century), an Irish poet and one of the four chief prophets of Ireland. The work The Prophecy of Berchán contains two parts believed to be written by these two authors. See discussions in Early Sources of Scottish History, A.D. 500 to 1286 (1922), Volume I, pp. xxxiv–xxxv, by Scottish historian Alan Orr Anderson (1879–1958), and Bibliography of English translations from Medieval Sources, pp. 75–76, 257–258, by Austin Patterson Evans and Clarissa Palmer Farrar.

- The prophecy of St. Berchán, MXCIV–MXCVII (8th century) In Chronicles of the Picts, chronicles of the Scots: and other early memorials of Scottish history (1867), pp. 79–105. By Scottish historian and antiquary William Forbes Skene (1809–1892).
- St. Bearcan Cecint (6th century). In The prophecies of SS. Columbkille, Maeltamlacht, Ultan, Seadhna, Coireall, Bearcan, Malachy, &c (1856). Together with the prophetic collectanea, or gleanings of several writers who have preserved portions of the now lost prophecies of our saints, with literal translation and notes. By Nicholas O'Kearney.

Bernard de Gordon. Bernard de Gordon ( fl. 1270 – 1330) was a French doctor and professor of medicine.

- Bernard of Gordon on epilepsy (1941). Translated by American epileptologist William Gordon Lennox (1884–1960). In the Annals of medical history., 3rd Series III (1941), pp. 372–383.

Bernard of Clairvaux. Bernard of Clairvaux (1090–1153), venerated as Saint Bernard, was a Burgundian abbot, and a major leader in the revitalization of Benedictine monasticism through the Order of Cistercians.

- Life and works of Saint Bernard, abbot of Clairvaux (1889–1896). In four volumes, edited by Dom. Jean Mabillon (1632–1707). Translated and edited with additional notes by Samuel John Eales.
- Apologia for the Second Crusade (1962). Adapted from De Consideratione Libri Quinque, in Patrologia Latina, Volume 182. Translated by American medieval historian James A. Brundage, in his work The Crusades: a documentary survey (1962).
- Translations of works by Bernard of Clairvaux.

Bernard of Menthon. Saint Bernard of Menthon, or Bernard of Montjoux (c. 1020 – 1081), was an Italian canon regular and founder of the Great St Bernard Hospice, and was confirmed as the patron saint of the Alps in 1923.

- The marvellous history of St. Bernard (1927). Adapted by French novelist Henri Ghéon (1875–1944) from a manuscript of the XV century. Translated into English by Barry V. Jackson (1879–1960), with a preface by Catholic priest and author Cyril Charlie Martindale (1879–1963).

Bernard of Morlaix. Bernard of Morlaix (of Cluny) (12th century) was a French Benedictine monk who wrote De contemptu mundi (On Contempt for the World), a long verse satire in Latin.

- Jerusalem the Golden, in Mediæval hymns and sequences (1863), by English Anglican priest, scholar and hymnwriter John Mason Neale (1818–1866).
- The rhythm of Bernard de Morlaix, monk of Cluny, on the celestial country (1866), edited and translated by J. M. Neale.

Bernard of Trevisano. Bernard Trevisano was a fictional Italian alchemist who reputed to have lived from 1406–1490.

- The answer of Bernardus Trevisanus, to the Epistle of Thomas of Bononia, physician to K. Charles the 8th (1680). In Aurifontina chymica, or, A collection of fourteen small treatises concerning the first matter of philosophers for the discovery of their (hitherto so much concealed) mercury which many have studiously endeavoured to hide, but these to make manifest for the benefit of mankind in general (1680). By John Frederick Houpreght, Nicholas Flamel (1330–1418) and George Ripley (c. 1415 – 1490).
- The text of alchemy and the song-verd (1920). Translated by Tenney L. Davis. In The Monist, XXX (1920), pp. 70–106.
- A treatise of Bernard, earl of Trevisan: Of the philosophers stone (1684). Transcribed by Gleb Butuzov from Collectanea Chemica, a collection of ten several treatise sin chymistry,, concerning the liquor alkahest, the mercury of philosophers (1684).

Bernard Silvestris. Bernard Silvestris (12th century) was a medieval Platonist philosopher and poet whose major work Cosmographia is a philosophical allegory, dealing with the creation of the universe.

- The Cosmographia of Bernardus Silvestris (1973). Translated by Winthrop Wetherbee (born 1938).

Bernard the Pilgrim. Bernard the Pilgrim (fl. 865) was a Frankish monk, also known as Bernard the Wise.

- Itinerarium of Bernard the Wise (1893). An account of Bernard's travels to the Holy Land in 867, translated by J. H. Bernard. In the library of Palestine Pilgrims' Text Society (PPTS), Volume III, Part 4.
- The voyage of Bernard the Wise, A. D. 867 (1848). Translated by English antiquarian and writer Thomas Wright (1810–1877) in his work Early Travels in Palestine (1848).

Bernardino of Siena. Bernardino of Siena (1380–1444) was an Italian priest and Franciscan missionary.

- Saint Bernardine of Siena: sermons (1920). Selected and edited by Don Nazareno Orlandi. Translated by Helen Josephine Robins (born 1871).
- Examples of San Bernardino (1926). Chosen by Ada M. Harrison.
- The seven words of Mary: derived from St. Bernardine of Siena (1889). By English religious writer Henry James Coleridge (1822–1893).

Berners, Juliana. Dame Juliana Berners (born 1388) was an English writer on heraldry, hawking and hunting. She is believed to have been prioress of the Priory of St Mary of Sopwell. The work Book of Saint Albans has been attributed to her.

- An American edition of The treatyse of fysshynge wyth an angle (1875). From The boke of St. Albans, by Dame Juliana Berners, A.D. 1496. Edited by George W. Van Siclen (1840–1903).
- The boke of Saint Albans (1901). By Dame Juliana Berners, containing treatises on hawking, hunting, and cote armour: printed at Saint Albans by the schoolmaster-printer in 1486; reproduced in facsimile, with an introduction by English printer and bibliographer William Blades (1824–1890).

Béroul. Béroul (12th century) was a Norman or Breton poet who wroteTristan, a Norman language version of the legend of Tristan and Iseult.

- The Romance of Tristan, by Béroul (1970). Translated by Alan S. Fedrick (1937–1975)

Beunans Meriasek. Beunans Meriasek (The Life of Saint Meriasek) is a Cornish-language play completed in 1504 concerning the legends of the life of Saint Meriasek, patron saint of Camborne.

- Beunans Meriasek: The life of Saint Meriasek, bishop and confessor. A Cornish drama (1872). Edited, with a translation and notes, by Celtic scholar Whitley Stokes (1830–1909).

Beuno. Saint Beuno (Beino) (died 640) was a 7th-century Welsh abbot, confessor, and saint.

- Beuno sant (1930). Translated by Welsh historian the Rev. Arthur Wade-Evans (1875–1964). In Archaeologia Cambrensis, Volume 85 (1930), pp. 315–341.

Bevis of Hampton. Bevis of Hampton (Beuve de Hanstone) was a legendary English hero and the subject of Anglo-Norman and other medieval metrical romances.

- Bown of Hamptoun (1892). In Selections from the Hengwrt manuscripts preserved in the Peniarth library (1876, 1892), Volume II, pp. 518–565. Translated by the Rev. Robert Williams (1810–1881), as continued by the Rev. Griffith Hartwell Jones (1859–1944).
- The Irish lives of Guy of Warwick and Bevis of Hampton (1907). Edited by Fred Norris Robinson (1871–1966). Irish texts, followed by English translations. Commentary in English. From the Zeitschrift für celtische Philologie, VI (1907/1908), pp. 9–180, 273–338, 556.

=== BI–BY ===
Biblia pauperum. The Biblia pauperum, or Bible of the poor, was a tradition of picture Bibles beginning probably with Saint Ansgar, and a common printed block-book in the later Middle Ages to visualize the typological correspondences between the Old and New Testaments.

- Text of the Biblia pauper (1886). In Christian iconography: or, The history of Christian art in the middle ages (1886), Volume II, pp. 403–430. By French historian and archaeologist Adolphe Naploéon Didron (1806–1867). Translated from the French by E. J. Millington; completed with additions and appendices by Irish antiquarian Margaret M'Nair Stokes (1832–1900).

Bidh Crinna. A collection of Irish sayings or proverbs, edited and translated by Norwegian linguist Carl J. S. Marstander (1883–1965). In Ériu, Volume V (1911), pp. 126–143.

Biel, Gabriel. Gabriel Biel (c. 1425 – 1495) was a German scholastic philosopher.

- Treatise on the power and utility of moneys (1930). By Master Gabriel Biel of Speyer, a very excellent man and profound thinker, licentiate in the most sacred letters, lecturer ordinarius, with the courage of his convictions, at the famous University of Tübingen, while he was in the world. Lately done into English by Robert Belle Burke (1868–1944) for Josiah Harmar Penniman (1868–1941).

Birgitta of Sweden. Saint Birgitta of Sweden (c. 1303 – 1373), known as Bridget Birgersdotter, was a mystic and saint, and founder of the Bridgettines nuns and monks.

- Revelations of St. Bridget, on the life and passion of Our Lord, and the life of His Blessed Mother (1862). Translated from the Latin. To which is prefixed an essay on private revelations, by William H. Neligan.
- The Revelations of St Birgitta (1929). Edited by William Patterson Cumming. In Early English Text Society, Original Series, Volume 178.

Biskupa sügur. Biskupa sügur, or bishops' saga is a genre of 13th and 14th century Icelandic prose histories (sagas) dealing with bishops of Iceland.

- Stories of the bishops of Iceland (1895). Translated from the Icelandic "Biskupa sögur" by the author of The chorister brothers, Mary Charlotte Julia Leith. Includes: I. The stories of Thorwald the Far-Fared, and of bishop Isleif (Ísleifs þáttr biskups). II. Húngrvaka (the Hunger-walker), being chronicles of the first five bishops of Skalholt (1056–1176). III. The story of bishop Thorlak the Saint (Þorláks saga helga).
- Lives of bishops (1905). In Origines islandicae (1905).. A collection of the more important sagas and other native writings relating to the settlement and early history of Iceland. Edited and translated by Icelandic scholar Gudbrand Vigfusson (1827–1889) and English historian Frederick York Powell (1850–1904).

Blacman, John. John Blacman (c. 1407 – 1485) was an English Carthusian monk who wrote a biography of Henry VI of England. He also owned a large collection of manuscripts, some written in his own hand, consisting of patristic, academic, and devotional texts.

- Henry the Sixth: A Reprint of John Blacman's Memoir (1919). A translation of Collectarium mansuetudinum et bonorum morum regis Henrici VI (first printed by William Coplande c. 1510) by English medievalist Montague Rhodes James (1862–1936).

Blancandin. Caxton's Blanchardyn and Eglantine c. 1489 (1890). From Lord Spencer's unique imperfect copy, completed by the original French and the second English version of 1595, edited by English lexicographer Leon Kellner (1859–1928). In Early English Text Society, Extra Series 58. From a work by English merchant and writer William Caxton (c. 1422 – c. 1491).

Blickling homilies. The Blickling homilies are a collection of anonymous homilies from 10th century Anglo-Saxon England. Written in Old English, they are among the oldest collections of sermons to survive from medieval England. Their name derives from Blickling Hall in Norfolk which once housed them.

- The Blickling homilies of the tenth century (1880). From the Marquis of Lothian's unique manuscript, A.D. 971. Edited with a translation and index of words, by British philologist the Rev. Richard Morris (1833–1894). In Early English Text Society, Original Series 58, 63, 73.

Boccaccio, Giovanni. Giovanni Boccaccio (1313–1375) was an Italian writer, poet, and correspondent of Petrarch, defined by some as the greatest European prose writer of his time. His most notable works are The Decameron, De Mulieribus Claris (On Famous Women) and Genealogia deorum gentilium libri.

- The Decameron (1620). Containing an hundred pleasant nouels. Wittily discoursed, betweene seuen honourable ladies and three noble gentlemen. Attributed to Giovanni Florio (1552–1625), a linguist, poet, writer, translator, lexicographer, and royal language tutor at the Court of James I of England.
- The Decameron (1886). By Giovanni Boccaccio, translated by English poet and translator John Payne (1842–1916). With an introduction by Sir Walter Raleigh (1861–1922) (reprinted from the English Review (1913), Volume 14, pp. 209–229).
- The Decameron of Giovanni Boccaccio (1930). Translated by Sicilian-born American biographer and fiction writer Frances Winwar (1900–1985).
- Famous women by Giovanni Boccaccio (2001) Edited and translated by Virginia Brown (1940–2009).
- La fiammetta (1907). A translation of Elegia di Madonna Fiammetta by James C. Brogan. In The new life: (La vita nuova) (1907), By Dante Alighieri. Translated by English poet Dante Gabriel Rossetti (1828–1882), with an introduction by American author Charles Eliot Norton (1827–1908). Includes: One hundred sonnets, by Francesco Petrarch; La fiammetta, by Giovanni Boccaccio; and Poems, by Michelangelo Buonarroti. (Petrarch's sonnets translated by various authors, including Chaucer. Michelangelo's Poems translated by John Addington Symonds.)
- The most pleasant and delectable questions of love (1931). An edition of Filocolo from a 1566 translation put into modern English by H. G., with an introduction by Thomas Bell. The identity of the translator H. G. is unknown, but candidates include Henry Grantham and Humphrey Gifford.
- Il Filostrato (1924). The story of the love of Troilo (Il Filostrato) as it was sung in Italian by Giovanni Boccaccio, and is now translated into English verse by Hubertis Maurice Cummings (1884–1963). The work was the inspiration for Chaucer's Troilus and Criseyde and therefore Shakespeare's Troilus and Cressida.
- The story of Troilus as told by Benoôit de Sainte-Maure, Giovanni Boccaccio (1934). See Benoôit de Sainte-More, above.
- Boccaccio on poetry (1930). Being the preface and the fourteenth and fifteenth books of Boccaccio's Genealogia decorum gentilium in an English version with introductory essay and commentary by Charles Grosvenor Osgood (1871–1964).
- Boccaccio's Olympia (1921). In Select early English poems, Volume 8 (1921). Translated and edited by English historian and Shakespearian scholar Sir Israel Gollancz (1863–1930).
- A translation of Giovanni Boccaccio's life of Dante (1900). With an introduction and a note on the portraits of Dante by American author George Rice Carpenter (1863–1909).
- The earliest lives of Dante (1901). Translated from the Italian of Giovanni Boccaccio and Lionardo Bruni Aretino [Leonardo Arentino Bruni, see below] by James Robinson Smith (1876–1954). In Yale Studies in English, Volume 10 (1901).
- Gualtherus and Griselda (1741). Or, The Clerk of Oxford's tale. From Boccace, Petrarch, and Chaucer. Stories of Griselda, edited by English author and translator George Ogle (1704–1746).
- Works by Giovanni Boccaccio.
- Translations of The Decameron.

Boekske (Dit Boecxken). A literal translation into English of the earliest known book of fowling and fishing (1492). Written Originally in Flemish and Printed at Antwerp in the Year 1492. Translated by Alfred Denison.

Beothius. Boethius, known as Anicius Manlius Severinus Boëthius (c. 477 – 524), was a Roman senator and philosopher. His major works include the Consolation of Philosophy and Opuscula sacra (Theological Tracts)

- The theological tractates (1918). By Boethius. Printed in Latin along with an English translation by British academic Hugh Frasier Stewart (1863–1948) and Edward Kennard Rand (1871–1945). In the same volume with the following.
- The consolation of philosophy (1918). By Boethius. Printed in Latin along with the English translation of I. T. (1609), revised by H. F. Stewart. The translator I. T. may be John Thorie (fl. 1590–1611).
- Queen Elizabeth's Englishings of Boethius, Plutarch and Horace (1899). De consolatione philosophiae, A.D. 1593; Plutarch, De curiositate [1598]; Horace, De arte poetica (part) A.D. 1598. Edited from the unique manuscript, partly in the Queen's hand, in the Public Record Office, London, by Miss Caroline Pemberton. In Early English Text Society, Original Series, 113.
- Works of Boethius.

Bojardo, Matteo Maria. Matteo Maria Bojardo (Boiardo) (1440–1494) was an Italian Renaissance poet, best known for his epic poem Orlando innamorato.

- The Orlando innamorato (1823). Translated into prose from the Italian of Francesco Berni (1497–1535) and interspersed with extracts in the same stanza as the original, by British poet William Stewart Rose (1775–1843).
- The expedition of Gradasso: a metrical romance (1812). Selected from the Orlando Innamorato. Translated by the author of "Charles Townley".
- The romances of chivalry in Italian verse: selections (1904). Edited by Jeremiah Denis Matthias Ford Ford (1873–1958) and Mary A. Ford.

Bonatti, Guido. Guido Bonatti (Bonatus) (died between 1296 and 1300) was an Italian mathematician, astronomer and celebrated astrologer. Bonatti was advisor of Frederick II, Holy Roman Emperor.

- Anima astrologiæ; or, A guide for astrologers (1886). Being the one hundred and forty-six considerations of the famous astrologer, Guido Bonatus, translated from the Latin by astrologer and mathematician Henry Coley (1633–1704), together with the choicest aphorisms of the seven segments of Italian polymath Gerolamo Cardan (1501–1576) of Milan, edited by astrologer William Lilly (1602–1681) in 1675. Republished from the original edition with notes and a preface by William Charles Eldon Serjeant.

Bonaventura. Saint Bonaventure, or Bonaventura (1221–1274), born Giovanni di Fidanza, was an Italian Franciscan, scholastic theologian and philosopher.

- The works of Saint Bonaventure (1955–1956). Edited by Franciscan Philotheus Boehner (1901–1955) and Sr. M. Frances Laughlin.
- A Franciscan view of the spiritual and religious life (1922). Being three treatises from the writings of Saint Bonaventure. Done into English by Father Dominic Devas (born 1888).
- The life of Christ (1881). By S. Bonaventure; translated and edited by William Henry Hutchings.
- The life of Saint Francis (1904). Translated by Emma Gurney Salter (born 1875).
- Bonaventure Texts in Translation Series, Franciscan Institute Publications.
- Works by Saint Bonaventure.

Bonfils, Immanuel ben Jacob. Immanuel ben Jacob Bonfils (c. 1300 – 1377) was a French-Jewish rabbi, mathematician and astronomer who is credited with inventing the system of decimal fractions.

- The invention of the decimal fractions and the application of the exponential calculus, by Immanuel Bonfils of Tarascon (c. 1350). Edited and translated by Solomon Gandz (1883–1954). In Isis,

Boniface. Saint Boniface (Bonifacius, Winfrid) (c. 675 – 754), the apostle of Germany, was a leading figure in the Anglo-Saxon mission to the Germanic parts of the Frankish Empire during the 8th century.

- The English correspondence of Saint Boniface (1911). Being for the most part letters exchanged between the apostle of the Germans and his English friends. Translated and edited with an introductory sketch of the saint's life by Edward Kylie (born 1880).
- Letters of Saint Boniface to the Popes and Others (1923). In the Papers of the American Society of Church History, Second Series VII (1923), pp. 157–186. First English translation by George Washington Robinson (born 1872), translator of Willibald's Life of Saint Boniface.
- The letters of Saint Boniface (1940). Translated by American historian Ephraim Emerton (1851–1935).
- Medieval Sourcebook: The Correspondence of St. Boniface (1954). From The Anglo-Saxon Missionaries in Germany, Being the Lives of SS. Willibrord, Boniface, Leoba and Lebuin together with the Hodoepericon of St. Willibald and a selection from the correspondence of St. Boniface (1954), by C. H. Talbot.

Bontier, Pierre. Pierre Bontier (15th century) was a French cleric. Bontier traveled with fellow cleric Jean Le Verrier and recorded the Conquista Betancuriana, the conquest of the Canary Islands in 1402 by the French knights Jean de Bethencourt (1362–1425) and Gadifer de la Salle (1340 –1415).

- The Canarian, or, Book of the conquest and conversion of the Canarians in the year 1402 by Messire Jean de Bethencourt, Kt. (1872). Composed by Pierre Bontier and Jean Le Verrier. Translated and edited, with notes and an introduction, by English geographer and librarian Richard Henry Major (1818–1891). Issued by the Hakluyt Society, First series, Volume 46.

Bonvesin da Riva. Bonvesin da la Riva (c. 1240 – c. 1313) was a Milanese lay member of the Ordine degli Umiliati (Order of the Humble Ones), a teacher of Latin grammar and a notable Lombard poet and writer of the 13th century.

- The fifty courtesies for the table (1879). Translated by English writer and critic William Michael Rossetti (1829–1919). In the Queene Elizabethes achademy ... essays on early Italian and German books of courtesy (1879). Part II, pp. 16–34. In Early English Text Society, Extra Series, 8.

Book of Ballymote. The Book of Ballymote (Leabhar Bhaile an Mhóta), is a manuscript compilation of the late 14th century, with contents including genealogy, the Auraicept na n-Éces, Lebor Gabála Érenn and Dinnshenchas Érenn.

- The Codex palatino-vaticanus, no. 830. Texts, translations and indices by Irish scholar and chronologist Bartholomew McCarthy (1843–1904). In the Todd Lecture Series, Royal Irish Academy, Volume 3.
- A list of ancient Irish authors, from the Book of Ballymote, 308 b.12 (1901). By Celtic scholar Whitley Stokes (1830–1909). In Zeitschrift für celtische Philologie, Volume III (1901), pp. 15–16.

Book of Enoch. The Book of Enoch (Henoch) is an ancient Hebrew apocalyptic religious text, ascribed to Enoch, the great-grandfather of Noah. Enoch contains unique material on the origins of demons and Nephilim, why some angels fell from heaven, an explanation of why the Genesis flood was morally necessary, and prophetic exposition of the thousand-year reign of the Messiah.

- The book of Enoch, or, 1 Enoch (1912). Edited and translated by Biblical scholar Robert Henry Charles (1855–1931). Translated from the editor's Ethiopic text and edited with the introduction, notes and indexes of the first edition wholly recast, enlarged and rewritten, together with a reprint from the editor's text of the Greek fragments.

Book of Hierotheus. The Book of Hierotheus is probably an original Syriac work, but previously claimed to have been composed in the 1st century AD, by a certain Hierotheus, but most Syriac writers who mention it attribute it to Syrian mystical writer Stephen Bar Sudhaile (c. 500 – c. 550).

- The book which is called the Book of the holy Hierotheos, with extracts from the Prolegomena and Commentary of Theodosius of Antioch and from the "Book of excerpts" and other works of Gregory Bar-Hebraeus (1927). Edited and translated by English clergyman Fred Shipley Marsh (1886–1953).
- Stephen bar Sudaili, the Syrian mystic, and the book of Hierotheos (1886). Translated by Arthur Lincoln Frothingham, Jr. (1859–1923).

Book of Lecan. The (Great) Book of Lecan, Leabhar (Mór) Leacáin, is a medieval Irish manuscript written between 1397 and 1418.

- The genealogies, tribes, and customs of Hy-Fiachrach, commonly called O'Dowda's country (1844). Now first published from the Book of Lecan, in the library of the Royal Irish academy, and from the genealogical manuscript of Duald MacFirbis, in the library of Lord Roden. With a translation and notes, and a map of Hy-Fiachrach, by Irish language scholar John O'Donovan (1809–1861).
- The tribes and customs of Hy-Many, commonly called O'Kelly's country (1843). From the Book of Lecan. With a translation and notes, and maps of Hy-Many, by John O'Donovan.

Book of Lecan, Yellow. The Yellow Book of Lecan (Leabhar Buidhe Leacáin) is a late medieval Irish manuscript containing much of the Ulster Cycle of Irish mythology,

- Dán Dé, the poems of Donnchadh Mór Ó Dálaigh and the religious poems in the Duanaire of the Yellow book of Lecan (1922). Translated by Lambert Andrews Joseph McKenna (1870–1956).

Book of Leinster. The Book of Leinster (Lebor Laignech) is a medieval Irish manuscript compiled c. 1160.

- The courtship of Ferb (1902). An old Irish romance transcribed in the twelfth century into the Book of Leinster. Translated into English prose and verse by Arthur Herbert Leahy (1857–1928). Illustrated by Caroline Watts.
- The ancient Irish epic tale Táin bó Cúalnge (The Cualnge cattle-raid) (1914). Now for the first time done entire into English out of the Irish of the Book of Leinster and allied manuscripts by Joseph Dunn (1872–1951), with two pages in facsimilé of the manuscripts.

Book of Lismore. The Book of Lismore (15th century) also known as the Book of Mac Carthaigh Riabhach, is a Gaelic manuscript that was created for Fínghean Mac Carthaigh (1478–1505).

- Lives of saints: from the Book of Lismore (1890). Edited with a translation, notes and indices by Celtic scholar Whitley Stokes (1830–1909).
- The conquests of Charlemagne (1917). Edited from the Book of Lismore and three other vellum manuscripts by scholar Douglas Hyde (1860–1949) who served as the first president of Ireland. Irish Texts Society, 20.

Book of Rights. Lebor na Cert, or the Book of Rights, is a book of Early Irish laws, from medieval Ireland. The text details the rents and taxes paid by the King of Cashel, to various others in Ireland. Both the Book of Lecan and the Book of Ballymote contain copies of the work.

- The Book of rights (1847). Now for the first time edited, with translation and notes, by Irish language scholar John O'Donovan (1809–1861).
- Lebor na cert = The Book of rights (1962). Edited by Miles Dillon. Irish Texts Society, 46.

Book of the Himyarites. The Book of the Himyarites, written in Syriac, deals with the growth of Christianity in Arabia and the troubles between the Abyssinians and the Himyarite kingdom of Yemen in the 6th century.

- The Book of the Himyarites: fragments of a hitherto unknown Syriac work (1924). With an introduction and translation by Swedish Syriac and Arabic scholar Alex Moberg (1872–1955).

Bordeaux pilgrim. The Bordeaux pilgrim was an anonymous pilgrim from Burdigala who wrote the Itinerarium Hierosolymitanum, the oldest known Christian itinerarium.

- Itinerary from Bordeaux to Jerusalem, 333 A.D. (1887). Translated by English historian Aubrey Stewart (1844–1916) and annotated by British archaeologist Colonel Sir Charles William Wilson (1836–1905). In the library of the Palestinian Pilgrims' Text Society (PPTS), Volume I, Part 2.

Bóroma. The Bóroma (12th century) is an Irish text with a translation by Celtic scholar Whitley Stokes (1830–1909). In Revue celtique, XIII (1892), pp. 32–124. Text from the Book of Leinster, supplemented by the Book of Lecan. The tale tells how an overking of Ireland in the second century imposed on Leinster, as punishment [an eric] for the death of his two daughters, a heavy tribute called Boroma. For five hundred years the people of Leinster struggled against payment of the tribute, when one of their saints stopped it through verbal trickery.

Bracton, Henry de. Henry de Bracton (c. 1210 – c. 1268) was an English cleric and jurist.

- Henrici de Bracton De legibus et consuetudinibus Angliæ. Libri quinque in varios tractatus distincti. Ad diversorum et vetustissimorum cordicum collationem typis vulgati. (1878–1883). Latin text included with translation by English jurist Sir Travers Twiss (1809–1897). Published by the authority of the lords commissioners of Her Majesty's Treasury, under the direction of the Master of the Rolls, in the Rolls Series, 70.

Brant, Sebastian. Sebastian Brant, or Brandt (1458–1521), was a German humanist and satirist, known for his satire Das Narrenschiff (The Ship of Fools).

- The ship of fools (1944). A satire by Sebastian Brant, translated into rhyming couplets, with introduction and commentary, by Edwin Hermann Zeydel (1893–1973). with reproductions of the original woodcuts.

Brendan. Saint Brendan of Clonfert (c. 484 – c. 577), called the Voyager, is one of the early Irish monastic saints. He was one of the Twelve Apostles of Erin.

- Brendaniana: St. Brendan the voyager in story and legend (1893). By Denis O'Donoghue.
- Bibliography of Brendan. See The sources for the early history of Ireland (1929) pp. 406–420, by James Francis Kenney (1884–1946).

Brewyn, William. William Brewyn of Canterbury (fl. 1470) was a pilgrim who spent considerable time in Rome, writing a guidebook for travelers. Sections of Brewyn's book are taken from other works, including saints' lives from Jacobus de Voragine's Legenda aurea and geographical notes from the Polychronicon of Ranulf Higden. The book's index includes an itinerary of Jerusalem and the Holy Land, but the pages on that subject have been excised from the only known copy, resident at the Library of Canterbury Cathedral.

- A XVth century guide-book to the principal churches of Rome (1933). Compiled c. 1470 by William Brewyn. Translated from the Latin with introduction and notes by Charles Eveleigh Woodruff (1856–1948).

Breydenbach, Bernhard von. Bernhard von Breidenbach (c. 1440 – 1497) was a German politician who wrote Peregrinatio in terram sanctam on his travels to the Holy Land.

- Translation of a Portion of the Account of a Pilgrimage begun at Oppenheim on the 23rd of April 1483, to Jerusalem, Terra Santa, Mount Sinai, and Egypt. Written in Latin by Bernard de Breitenbach, Dean of Mentz. Translated by Bartholomew Frere (1778–1851). In the Journal of the Royal Geographical Society of London, Volume IX (1839), pp. 311–317.

Brigit. Saint Brigit, or Brigid of Kildare (c. 451 – 525), was an early Irish Christian nun, abbess, and foundress of several monasteries of nuns, including that of Kildare in Ireland. She is one of Ireland's patron saints, along with Saint Patrick and Saint Columba.

- Betha Brigta: On the life of Saint Brigit. In Three Middle-Irish homilies on the lives of Saints Patrick, Brigit and Columba (1877). Edited by Celtic scholar Whitley Stokes (1830–1909).
- Life of Brigit. In Lives of saints: from the Book of Lismore (1890), pp. 182–200. Edited with a translation, notes and indices by W. Stokes.
- The Old Irish life of St. Brigit. Translated by M. A. O'Brien. In Irish historical studies, Volume I (1938–1939), pp. 121–134, 343–353.

Britton. Britton (c. 1290) is the earliest summary of the law of England in French, purportedly to have been written by command of King Edward I.

- Britton (1865). The French text revised with an English translation, introduction and notes by Francis Morgan Nichols (1826–1915). Includes: The origin and authorship of Britton; Relation of Britton to earlier and contemporary treatises; Character, method, and arrangement of Britton; Summary of the contents of Britton; Language of Britton; Manuscripts of Britton; Printed editions of Britton; Formation of the present text.
- Britton: Containing the antient pleas of the crown (1762). Translated and illustrated with references, notes, and ancient records by English attorney and legal antiquary Robert Kelham (1717–1808). A translation through Chapter 25 of Book 1.

Brunanburh. The Battle of Brunanburh is an Old English poem, found under year 937 in the Anglo-Saxon Chronicle (cf. Wikisource, The Anglo-Saxon Chronicle (Giles)). The poem records the battle of Brunanburh fought between Æthelstan's English army and a combined army of Scots, Vikings, and Britons.

- The song of Brunanburh. Translated by Hallam Tennyson (1852–1928). In the Contemporary review, XXVII (1876), pp. 920–922.

Bruni, Leonardo Arentino. Leonardo Arentino Bruni, also known as Lionardo Bruni Aretino (c. 1370 – 1444), was an Italian humanist, historian and statesman.

- The earliest lives of Dante (1901). Translated from the Italian of Giovanni Boccaccio and Lionardo Bruni Aretino [Leonardo Arentino Bruni] by James Robinson Smith (1876–1954). In Yale Studies in English, Volume 10 (1901).
- The early lives of Dante (1904). Translated by English economist and medievalist Philip Henry Wicksteed (1844–1927), derived from the translation of J. R. Smith.

Brunschwig, Hieronymus. Hieronymus Brunschwig (c. 1450 – c. 1512) was a German surgeon, alchemist and botanist. He was notable for his work on the treatment of gunshot wounds and on distillation techniques.

- The noble experyence of the vertuous handy warke of surgeri, practysyd [and] compyled by the moost experte mayster Iherome of Bruynswyke, borne in Straesborowe in Almayne (1525). Translated by Buch du Chirugie, an army surgeon.
- The vertuose boke of distyllacyon of the waters of all maner of herbes with the fygures of the styllatoryes, fyrst made and compyled by the thyrte yeres study and labour of the moste co[n]nynge and famous mayster of phisyke, Master Iherom bruynswyke (1527). Translated by Laurence Andrew (fl. 1510–1537).
- A most excellent and perfecte homish apothecarye or homely physik booke, for all the grefes and diseases of the bodye (1561). Translated from the Almaine speech into English by John Hollybush.

Brut chronicle. The Brut chronicle (Prose Brut) refers to a number of medieval chronicles of the history of England. The original Prose Brut was written in Anglo-Norman and translated into Latin and English. The chronicle begins with the mythological founding of Britain by Brutus of Troy. The first Anglo-Norman versions end with the death of Henry III of England in 1272 and later versions extend the narrative.

- The Brut: or the Chronicles of England (1906–1908). Edited from ms. Rawl. B 171, Bodleian Library, with introduction, notes and glossary, by Friedrich Daniel Wilhelm Brie (1880–1948). (cf. German Wikipedia, Friedrich Brie). In Early English Text Society, Original series, Volumes 131, 136.

Brut y Tywysogion. Brut y Tywysogion (Chronicle of the Princes) is one of the primary sources for Welsh history and is an annalistic chronicle that serves as a continuation of Geoffrey of Monmouth's Historia Regum Britanniae. One of the more important versions version covers the period 682–1332.

- Brut y tywysogion: The chronicle of the princes of Wales (1860). Edited by English antiquary and Anglican priest John Williams ab Ithel (1811–1862). In Welsh and English. The chronicle, to about 1150, is supposedly written by Caradog of Llancarvan, completed by the monks of the monastery of Strata Florida. It is also known as the Strata Florida chronicle. Published by the authority of the lords commissioners of Her Majesty's Treasury, under the direction of the Master of the Rolls (Rolls Series 17).

Brychan documents. The genealogy of Brychan Brycheiniog, a legendary 5th-century king of Brycheiniog.

- The Brychan documents. Edited and translated by Welsh historian the Rev. Arthur Wade-Evans (1875–1964). In Y Cymmrodor, XIX (1906), pp. 18–50. Includes two genealogical documents: De situ Brecheniauc and Cognacio Brychan. Notes: The sons of Brychan; The daughters of Brychan; The Four Sepulchra; Paleographical.

Bryene, Dame Alice de. Dame Alice de Bryene (died 1435) was an English noblewoman who owned estates in Suffolk and was present at the court of Richard II of England.

- The Household Book of Dame Alice de Bryene, of Acton Hall, Suffolk, September 1412 – September 1413, with Appendices (1931). Translated by Miss M. K. Dale and edited by Vincent Burrough Redstone. Published by the Suffolk Institute of Archaeology and Natural History.

Buile Suibhne Geilt. Buile Shuibhne (Suibhne's Frenzy) is an old Irish tale about Suibhne mac Colmáin, king of the Dál nAraidi. Driven insane by the curse of Saint Rónán Finn, Suibhne left the battle of Magh Rath, fought in 637, and entered a life of wandering, earning him the nickname Suibhne Geilt (Suibhne the Madman).

- Buile Suibhne (The frenzy of Suibhne) being the adventures of Subhne Geilt, a Middle Irish romance (1913). Edited with translation, introduction, notes and glossary by James George O'Keeffe (1865–1937). Irish Texts Society, 12.

Burchard, Johann. Johann Burchard (c. 1450 – 1506), bishop of Orte and Cività Castellana, was a German priest and chronicler who spent his entire career at the papal courts, serving as pontifical Master of Ceremonies.

- The diary of John Burchard of Strasburg (1910). Translated from the Latin text published in Paris, with notes and appendices by the Right Rev. Arnold Harris Mathew (1852–1919).
- Pope Alexander VI and his court: extracts from the Latin diary of Johannes Burchardus (1921). Edited by Dr. F. L. Glaser.

Burchard of Mount Sion. Burchard of Mount Sion (fl. 1283) was a German friar who took a pilgrimage to the Holy Land from 1274-1284 and documented his travels in Descriptio Terrae Sanctae (Description of the Holy Land), one of the last detailed accounts prior to 1291.

- Burchard of Mount Sion, A.D. 1280 (1896). Translated by English historian and translator Aubrey Stewart (1844–1916). Topography annotated by Sir Lieut.-Col. Claude Reignier Conder (1848–1910). In the library of Palestine Pilgrims' Text Society (PPTS), Volume XII.

Busch, Johann. Johann Busch (1399–1480) was a reformer and provost of a community of Canons Regular.

- The autobiography of Johann Busch. In the British magazine, XIX (1841), pp. 369–379, 489–499.

Butzbach, Johannes. Johannes Butzbach (1477–1526), a wandering scholar (vagante).

- The autobiography of Johannes Butzbach: a wandering scholar of the fifteenth century (1933). Translated from the German by Robert Francis Seybolt (1888–1951) and Paul Monroe (1869–1947). Includes as an appendix Burkhard Zink, a wandering scholar of the fifteenth century (1920).

Buzurg ibn Shahriyār, al-Rām-Hurmuzi. Buzurg Ibn Shahriyar of Ramhormuz (10th century) was a Muslim traveler, sailor, cartographer and geographer born in Khuzistan. In 953 he completed a collection of narratives from Muslim sailors called Ajaib al-Hind (The wonders of India).

- The book of the marvels of India (1928). Translated from the Arabic into French by L. Marcel Devic and into English by Peter Quennell (1905–1993).

Byrhtferth. Byrhtferth (c. 970 – c. 1020) was a mathematician and monk (in priest's orders) who lived at Ramsey Abbey, studying under Abbo of Fleury. He wrote many computistic, hagiographic, and scientific works.

- Byrhtferth's Manual (AD 1011) (1929). Edited from ms. Ashmole 328 in the Bodleian library. With an introduction, translation, sources, vocabulary, glossary of technical terms, appendices and seventeen plates by Samuel John Crawford (1884–1931). Published for Early English Text Society, Original series, 127.
- Byrhtferth's Enchiridion (1995). Edited and translated by Peter S. Baker and Michael Lapidge. Published for Early English Text Society, Supplementary series, 15.
- Byrhtferth's Preface (1928). Edited and translated by George Frank Forsey. In Speculum, III (1928), pp. 505–522.

== Source material ==
- A general collection of the best and most interesting voyages and travels in all parts of the world
- A general history and collection of voyages and travels to the end of the eighteenth century
- Archaeologia Cambrensis
- Beowulf's Afterlives Bibliographic Database
- Bibliography of English translations from Medieval Sources
- British magazine
- Contemporary review
- Early English Text Society
- Early Sources of Scottish History, A.D. 500 to 1286
- Early Travels in Palestine
- English Historical Review
- English Review
- Ériu
- Hakluyt Society publications
- Hakluytus posthumus
- Harvard theological review
- History of India, as Told by its Own Historians, The Muhammadan Period
- Irish historical studies
- Irish Texts Society
- Isis
- Jewish forum
- Jewish Quarterly Review
- Journal of chemical education
- Journal of sacred literature
- Journal of the Cork Historical and Archaeological Society
- Journal of the Royal Asiatic Society
- Journal of the Royal Geographical Society of London
- Library of original sources
- Loeb Classical Library
- Medical life
- Medieval encounters
- Medieval narrative: a book of translations
- Navigantium atque itinerantium bibliotheca, or, A compleat collection of voyages and travels
- Origines islandicae.
- Palestine Pilgrims' Text Society (PPTS), Library of
- Papers of the American Society of Church History
- Patrologia Latina
- Proceedings of the Society of Biblical Archaeology
- Records of the Glasgow Bibliographical Society
- Revue celtique
- Saga Library
- Scriptorium
- Society for Promoting Christian Knowledge (SPCK)
- Select early English poems
- Select historical documents of the Middle Ages
- Speculum: A Journal of Medieval Studies
- Texts and studies, contributions to Biblical and patristic literature
- Todd Lecture Series
- The Crusades: a documentary survey
- The golden legend; or, Lives of the saints
- The Monist
- Transactions of Cumberland and Westmorland Antiquarian and Archaeological Society
- Yale Studies in English
- Y Cymmrodor
- Zeitschrift für Assyriologie und verwandte Gebiete.
- Zeitschrift für celtische Philologie

== See also ==
- Alchemical Studies
- Enochian
- Icelandic literature
- Islamic literature
- Medieval literature
- Scottish literature in the Middle Ages
- The Letter Of Roger Bacon Concerning The Marvelous Power Of Art And Nature And The Nullity Of Magic
