= Lists of English translations from medieval sources =

The lists of English translations from medieval sources provide overviews of notable medieval documents—historical, scientific, ecclesiastical and literary—that have been translated into English. This includes the original author, translator(s) and the translated document. Translations are from Old and Middle English, Old French, Irish, Scots, Old Dutch, Old Norse or Icelandic, Italian, Latin, Arabic, Greek, Persian, Syriac, Ethiopic, Coptic, Armenian, Hebrew and German, and most works cited are generally available in the University of Michigan's HathiTrust digital library and OCLC's WorldCat. Anonymous works are presented by topic.

== Lists of English translations ==
- English translations: A
- English translations: B
- English translations: C
- English translations: D
- English translations: E
- English translations: F–Z

== Source material ==
The sources used to identify relevant translations include the following.

Journals

- American journal of Semitic languages and literatures. An academic journal covering research on the ancient and medieval civilizations of the Near East, including archaeology, art, history, literature, linguistics, religion, law, and science. Established in 1884 as Hebraica, becoming the American journal of Semitic languages and literatures in 1895 and the Journal of Near Eastern studies in 1942.
- American law journal
- Annals of medical history. A journal on the history of medicine published 1917–1942.
- Archaeologia Aeliana. Miscellaneous tracts relating to antiquity. Journal of the Society of Antiquaries of Newcastle upon Tyne, published since 1822.
- Archaeologia cambrensis. A Welsh archaeological and historical scholarly journal published annually by the Cambrian Archaeological Association. It contains historical essays, excavation reports, and book reviews, on the history, genealogy, heraldry, toponymy, folklore and literature of Wales.
- Archaeologia cantiana.
- Archaeologia, or, Miscellaneous tracts relating to antiquity.
- Archaeological review. A journal of historic and pre-historic antiquities published in 4 volumes 1888–1890.
- Biblioteca sacra. The oldest theological journal in the United States, first published in 1844.
- British magazine, And monthly register of religious and ecclesiastical information, parochial history, and documents respecting the state of the poor, progress of education, etc.
- Bulletin of the John Rylands Library. A quarterly bulletin whose primary purpose is to record the titles of works acquired for the John Rylands Library.
- Byzantinische Zeitschrift. A Byzantine studies journal established in 1892.
- Cambrian register (1796, 1818). Edited by William Owen Pughe (1759–1835).
- Celtic Review.
- Contemporary review.
- Der Islam: Journal of the History and Culture of the Middle East. A biannual academic journal covering research on the history and culture of the Middle East established in 1910.
- English Historical Review. An academic journal established in 1886 and publishing articles on all aspects of history – British, European, and world history – since the classical era. It is the oldest surviving English language academic journal in the discipline of history.
- English Review.
- Ériu. An academic journal of Irish language studies established in 1904.
- Études Celtiques.
- The expositor. Devoted to the exposition of the Holy Scriptures.
- Folklore. A quarterly review of myth, tradition, institution and custom, incorporating the Archælogical review and the Folk-lore journal, begun in 1892.
- Fraser's magazine for Town and Country. A general and literary journal published from 1830 to 1882.
- Harvard theological review.
- Hermathena.
- Indian antiquary. A journal of oriental research in archaeology, history, literature, language, philosophy, religion, and folklore.
- Irish Ecclesiastical Record. An Irish Roman Catholic monthly journal founded in 1864 containing articles on theology, liturgy, church affairs, Catholic social theory, literature, philosophy, history and Irish social and economic conditions.
- Irische Texte mit Wörterbuch.
- Irish penny journal.
- Irish historical studies.
- Irisleabhar na Gaedhilge. A Gaelic journal published from 1882 to 1885 in 2 volumes. Devoted to the preservation and cultivation of the Irish language. Published by the Gaelic League.
- Isis. An international review devoted to the history and science of civilization.
- Islamica. A journal devoted to the study of the languages, arts, and civilisations of the Islamic peoples. Supplement volume of the Asia Major. Published quarterly from 1824 to 1835.
- Islandica. An annual relating to Iceland and the Fiske Icelandic collection in Cornell University Library.
- Janus. Organ of the Société historique néerlandaise des sciences médicales, exactes et naturelles, 1915–1941.
- Jewish forum. Published 1918–1948
- Jewish Historical Studies.
- Jewish Quarterly Review. A quarterly academic journal covering Jewish studies, 1888–present. It is the oldest English-language journal of Judaic scholarship.
- Journal of English and Germanic philology.
- Journal of sacred literature. Publishing original essays on Biblical history, geography, natural history and antiquities; biography; and Biblical bibliography.
- Journal of theological studies. An academic journal established in 1899 publishing theological research, scholarship, and interpretation, and hitherto unpublished ancient and modern texts, inscriptions, and documents.
- Journal of the American Oriental Society. A quarterly academic journal published by the American Oriental Society since 1843.
- Journal of the Bombay Branch of the Royal Asiatic Society. A publication of the organization now known as the Asiatic Society of Mumbai.
- Journal of Chemical Education. A monthly academic journal published by the American Chemical Society.
- Journal of the Cork Historical and Archaeological Society. A journal published annually that contains illustrated articles on history, archaeology, genealogy, folklore and reviews of books and periodicals related to County Cork.
- Journal of the County Louth Archaeological Society.
- Journal of philology. Founded in 1868 by leading Cambridge scholars William George Clark (1821–1878), John E. B. Mayor (1825–1910), and William Aldis Wright (1831–1914).
- Journal of the Royal Asiatic Society
- Journal of the Royal Asiatic Society of Great Britain and Ireland. An academic journal which publishes articles on the history, archaeology, literature, language, religion and art of South Asia, the Middle East, since 1834.
- Journal of the Royal Geographical Society of London. A scholarly journal on topics in geography, published by the Royal Geographical Society from 1831 to 1880. Edited by English naturalist Henry Walter Bates (1825–1892) from 1864 to 1880.
- Journal of the Society of Oriental Research. A journal to promote the scientific study of the results of archaeology and exploration in the fields of ancient Semitic and Egyptian languages, literatures, and religions and in that of ancient oriental liturgies.
- Journal of the Royal Historical and Archaeological Association of Ireland.
- Journal of the Royal Society of Antiquaries of Ireland.
- Kerry archaeological magazine.
- Le muséon.
- Medical life. A journal of the American Society of Medical History published from 1920 to 1938.
- Medieval encounters.
- Modern philology.
- Orientalia.
- Papers of the American Society of Church History.
- Poet lore. An English-language literary magazine established in 1889.
- Proceedings of the Dorset Natural History and Antiquarian Field Club.
- Proceedings of the Literary and Philosophical Society of Liverpool.
- Publications of the Modern Language Association of America.
- Proceedings of the Royal Irish Academy, Section C: Archæology, Linguistic and Literature.
- Proceedings of the Society of Biblical Archaeology
- Retrospective review, and historical and antiquarian magazine.
- Revue celtique.
- Romanic review.
- Scottish gaelic studies.
- Seanchas Ardmhacha: Journal of the Armagh Diocesan Historical Society.
- Scriptorium. Printed 1946–2012.
- Speculum: A Journal of Medieval Studies
- The Monist.
- The Month.
- Transactions of Cumberland and Westmorland Antiquarian and Archaeological Society. Journal of the Cumberland and Westmorland Antiquarian and Archaeological Society.
- Transactions of the Gaelic Society of Dublin. Journal of the Gaelic Society of Dublin, published once in 1808.
- Transactions of the Honourable Society of Cymmrodorion
- Transactions of the Philological Society
- Transactions of the Royal Irish Academy, Antiquities.
- Transactions of the Society of Biblical Archæology.
- Ulster Journal of Archaeology.
- Western Reserve University Bulletin
- Y Cymmrodor
- Zeitschrift für Assyriologie und verwandte Gebiete.
- Zeitschrift für celtische Philologie.

Collections

- A general collection of the best and most interesting voyages and travels in all parts of the world, many of which are now first translated into English: digested on a new plan, 17 volumes (1808–1814). Translated by Scottish antiquary John Pinkerton (1758–1826).
- A general history and collection of voyages and travels to the end of the eighteenth century (1811). By Scottish writer and translator Robert Kerr (1757–1813).
- American oriental series. A series of monographs published by the American Oriental Society, encouraging basic research in the languages and literatures of the Near East and Asia.
- Anecdota Oxoniensia: Mediaeval and modern series (1882–1929).
- Ante-Nicene Christian library. A collection of books in 10 volumes containing English translations of early Christian writings. Works related to Ante-Nicene Fathers at Wikisource.
- Archaeologia aeliana, or, Miscellaneous tracts relating to antiquities. Published since 1822 by the Society of Antiquaries of Newcastle upon Tyne.
- Columbia University oriental studies. A series of ancient and medieval translations published in 1902.
- Crusade Texts in Translation. A book series of 27 volumes of English translations of texts about the Crusades.
- Dallas Medieval Texts and Translations. Series of 23 volumes of medieval Latin texts, with English translations, from 500 to 1500, representing the whole breadth and variety of medieval civilization.
- Early English Text Society
- E. J. W. Gibb memorial series. A book series with important works of Arabic, Persian and Turkish history, literature, philosophy and religion, including many works in English translation.
- Everyman's Library.
- Hakluyt Society publications A text publication society, founded in London in 1846. Publishes scholarly editions of primary records of historic voyages, travels and other geographical material. Named after English adventurer and author Richard Hakluyt (1553–1616).
- Hakluytus posthumus (1906), by Samuel Purchas (c. 1577 – 1626). A twenty-volume collection of travel stories that can be seen as a continuation of Richard Hakluyt's Principal Navigations, partially based on manuscripts left by Hakluyt.
- Harvard Classics (1909–1910). A 50-volume series of works from world literature, important speeches, and historical documents. Edited by Charles William Eliot (1834–1926).
- Historical and linguistic studies in literature related to the New Testament.
- History of India, as Told by its Own Historians The Muhammadan Period. A collection of translations of medieval Persian chronicles based on the work of English historian Henry Miers Elliot. Edited by British Indologist John Dowson (1820–1881). Multiple translators including Sir H. M. Elliot, the editor and various (unidentified) munshi.
- Irish Texts Society.
- Library of fathers of the holy Catholic church: Anterior to the division of the East and West (1838–1881). Translated by John Henry Parker.
- Loeb classical library.
- New medieval library
- Nicene and Post-Nicene Fathers: Series I (1885) (Wikisource)
- Palestine Pilgrims' Text Society (PPTS), Library of
- Patrologia Graecae
- Patrologia Latina
- Patrologia Orientalis
- Publications of the Scottish History Society.
- Rerum Britannicarum medii ævi scriptores: or, Chronicles and memorials of Great Britain and Ireland during the Middle Ages (Rolls Series)
- Roxburghe Club Books.
- Sacred books and early literature of the East
- Saga Library. Six volume series published 1891–1905. A collection of Scandinavian sagas in Icelandic covering history, folklore, and language by British translator William Morris (1834–1896) and Icelandic scholar Eiríkr Magnússon (1833–1913). Includes selected sagas of Icelanders and Heimskringla (Stories of the Kings of Norway, called the Circle of the World) by Icelandic historian and poet Snorri Sturluson.
- Select library of Nicene and post-Nicene fathers of the Christian church, Second series. (Wikisource library).
- Six old English chronicles.
- Society for Promoting Christian Knowledge (SPCK)
- Studia sinaitica.
- Source Collections in Translation, Dartmouth University
- Studies in Islamic mysticism
- Studies in Islamic poetry
- Texts and studies, contributions to Biblical and patristic literature (1891–1902). by Joseph Armitage Robinson (1858–1933)
- The Johns Hopkins Studies in Romance Literatures and Languages
- Todd Lecture Series. Royal Irish Academy
- Tracts relating to Ireland (1841–1843). Published by the Irish Archaeological Society.
- Transactions of the Ossianic Society (1853–1858). Six volumes published by the Ossianic Society of Dublin.
- Trübner's oriental series
- Tudor translations, 44 volumes (1892–1909). By William Ernest Henley (1849–1903).
- University of Michigan Studies, Humanistic Series.
- University of Washington, Publications in the social sciences
- Wisdom of the East series
- Woodbrooke Studies: Christian Documents in Syriac, Arabic, and Garshūni.
- Writings of the early Christians of the 2nd century.
- Yale Studies in English.

Compilations

- Ancient Irish tales (1936). By Tom Peete Cross (1879–1951) and Clark Harris Stover. Tales of the Tuatha de Danann; The Ulster cycle; The cycle of Finn, Ossian, and their companions; Tales of the traditional kings.
- Celtic Scotland: a history of ancient Alban (1886–1890), by William Forbes Skene (1809–1892).
- Church historians of England. Translated from the Latin by English archivist Joseph Stevenson (1806–1895) Includes: The Historical Works of the Venerable Beda; The Anglo-Saxon Chronicle, The Chronicle of Florence of Worcester; The Chronicle of Fabius Ethelweerd, Asser's Annals of King Alfred, The Book of Hyde, The Chronicles of John Wallingford, The History of Ingulf, Gaimar; The History of the Kings of England, and of His own Times, by William of Malmesbury; The Historical Works of Simeon of Durham; The Chronicles of John and Richard of Hexham, The Chronicle of Holyrood, The Cronicle of Melrose, Jordan Fantosme's Chronicle, Documents Respecting Canterbury and Winchester; The History of William of Newburgh, The Chronicles of Robert De Monte; History of King Henry The First; The Acts of Stephen, King of England, and Duke of Normandy; Giraldus Cambrensis Concerning The Introduction of Princes; Richard of Devizes; The History of the Archbishops of Canterbury, by Gervase, Monk of Canterbury; Robert of Gloucester's Chronicle; The Chronicle of the Isle of Man; The Life and Defence of John Foxe; The Acts and Monuments of John Foxe; The Acts and Monuments of John Foxe.
- Coptic manuscripts in the Freer Collection. By Coptic scholar William Hoyt Worrell (1879–1952).
- Drama from the Middle Ages to the Early Twentieth Century: An Anthology of Plays with Old Spelling. Edited by Christopher J. Wheatley.
- Early Travels in Palestine (1848). By English antiquarian and writer Thomas Wright (1810–1877).
- Egyptian tales and romances: pagan, Christian and Muslim (1931). Translated by Ernest Alfred Wallis Budge.
- Epic and saga (1910). Includes: Beowulf, The songs of Roland, The destruction of Dá Derga's hostel, The story of the Volsungs and Niblungs, Songs from The Elder Edda. Harvard classics 49.
- Exeter Book (1895).
- India in the fifteenth century (1857). By English geographer Richard Henry Major (1818–1891).
- Library of original sources (1907). Edited by Oliver Joseph Thatcher (1857–1937).
- Medieval narrative: a book of translations (1928), by American medievalist Margaret Schlauch (1898–1986).
- Miscellaneous translations, in prose and verse, from Roman poets, orators, and historians (1724), by William Warburton (1698–1779).
- Monumenta juridica: The Black book of the Admiralty, with an appendix (1871–1876). By Sir Travers Twiss (1809–1897).
- Navigantium atque itinerantium bibliotheca, or, A compleat collection of voyages and travels (1705), by English writer and scientist John Harris (c. 1666 – 1719). Revised edition (1744) edited by Scottish author John Campbell (1708–1775).
- Origines islandicae (1905). A collection of the more important sagas and other native writings relating to the settlement and early history of Iceland. Five books in two volumes. Edited and translated by Icelandic scholar Gudbrand Vigfusson (1827–1889) and English historian Frederick York Powell (1850–1904).
- Primitive Christianity reviv'd: in four volumes (1711), by English theologian and historian William Whiston(1667–1752).
- Royal Irish Academy. Irish manuscript series. (1890),
- Select early English poems (1913–1930). Translated and edited by Israel Gollancz (1863–1930).
- Select historical documents of the Middle Ages (1892). Translated and edited by Ernest Flagg Henderson (1861–1928).
- Selections from the Hengwrt mss. preserved in the Peniarth library (1876–1892). Selections of the Hengwrt–Peniarth manuscripts, edited and translated by the Rev. Robert Williams (1810–1881), continued by the Rev. Griffith Hartwell Jones (1859–1944).
- Silva gadelica (I–XXXI), edited by Standish Hayes O'Grady (1832–1915).
- The Crusades: a documentary survey (1962). By James A. Brundage.
- The voyage of Bran, son of Febal, to the land of the living (1895–1897). By Kuno Meyer (1858–1919). and Alfred Trübner Nutt (1856–1910).
- The works of John Hookham Frere in verse and prose (1872). Translations by English diplomat and writer John Hookham Frere (1769–1846).
- The works of the British poets (1795), With prefaces, biographical and critical by Robert Anderson (1750–1830).
- Translations and Reprints from the Original Sources of European History (1897–1902). A collection published by the University of Pennsylvania.

Essays and other miscellany

- Antiquarian repertory, 4 volumes (1775–1784). A miscellany intended to preserve and illustrate several valuable remains of old times : adorned with elegant sculptures. Edited by English antiquaries Thomas Astle (1735–1803) and Francis Grose (before 1731 – 1791).
- Bentley's miscellany, 64 volumes (1837–1868). Successively edited by Charles Dickens, William Harrison Ainsworth, Albert Richard Smith and others.
- Encyclopædia Romana. Incidental essays on the history and culture of Rome.
- Fifteenth annual report of the Dante Society (1896).
- Influence of medieval upon Welsh literature. By Thomas Wright (1810–1877).
- Lectures on the manuscript materials of ancient Irish history (1861). By Irish philologist and antiquary Eugene O'Curry (1796–1862).
- Letters of wit, politicks and morality.
- Macdonald Presentation Volume.
- Miscellany of the Irish Archaeological Society.
- On the manners and customs of the ancient Irish (1873). By Eugene O'Curry. Edited with an introduction, appendixes, etc., by William Kirby Sullivan (1821–1890).
- The golden legend; or, Lives of the saints. Translated (Englished) by William Caxton (c. 1422 – c. 1491).
- Twenty-fourth annual report of the Dante Society (1906).

Databases

- Beowulf's Afterlives Bibliographic Database.
- Catalogue for collection items held by the National Library of Australia.
- Early English Books Online (EEBO).
- Gnostic Society Library. An online library of a collection of primary documents relating to the Gnostic tradition.
- Mathematics Genealogy Project. A web-based database of the academic genealogy of mathematicians.
- Online Books Library.

Bibliographies

- A literary history of England, 4 volumes (1948). Edited by Albert Croll Baugh (1891–1981). Volume I: The Middle Ages. The Old English Period (to 1100), by Kemp Malone (1889–1971). The Middle English Period (1100–1500), by Albert C. Baugh.
- Bibliography of English translations from Medieval Sources, by Austin Patterson Evans and Clarissa Palmer Farrar.
- Early Sources of Scottish History, A.D. 500 to 1286, 2 volumes (1922), by Scottish historian Alan Orr Anderson (1879–1958).
- Fifteenth century English books; a bibliography of books and documents printed in England and of books for the English market printed abroad (1917). By British bibliographer Edward Gordon Duff (1861–1924).
- Hakluyt Society Bibliography, a resource for geographical discovery and exploration books.
- Manual of the writings in Middle English,1050–1400 (1923–1927). By John Edwin Wells (1875–1943).
- Records of the Glasgow Bibliographical Society.
- Select Bibliography of Publications Mainly in English, in The Routledge Companion to the Crusades by Peter Lock.

== See also ==
- Annals
- Arabic literature
- Armenian literature
- Chronicles
- Garshuni
- Hagiography
- Historians and Histories of the Crusades
- Islamic literature
- Medieval literature
- Medieval theatre
- Miracle play
- Mystery play
- New Testament apocrypha
- Persian literature
- Syriac literature
