= Arthur Wade-Evans =

Welsh clergyman and historian

Arthur Wade Evans (31 August 1875 – 4 January 1964) was a Welsh clergyman and historian.

== Biography ==
Evans was born in Fishguard, Pembrokeshire, Wales on 31 August 1875 to Titus Evans and Elizabeth Thomas (parents Thomas Thomas and Ann Wade) who married on 4 July 1863. His father was a master mariner. Evans was educated at Haverfordwest Grammar school (1891 census refers). In 1893, he matriculated at Jesus College, Oxford, graduating in 1896. He was ordained deacon in St Paul's Cathedral in 1898 and then served as curate in various parishes, including Ealing, Cardiff, and English and Welsh Bicknor. In 1909, he was appointed vicar of France Lynch, Gloucestershire, where he remained until 1926. He campaigned for the disestablishment of the Church in Wales. He was, from 1926 to 1932, vicar of Potterspury with Furtho and Yardley Gobion (1926–32), before his final appointment as rector of Wrabness from 1932 to 1957 with the 1939 census giving an address of The Rectory, Tendring, Essex. He then retired to Frinton-on-Sea, Essex. He died on 4 January 1964.

He was a historian of early Britain, the Celtic church and Welsh law, although some of his theories were unorthodox. He translated and studied many early historical sources, with his publications including Nennius's "History of the Britons" (1938) Coll Prydain (1950) and The Emergence of England and Wales (1956, 1959). Church history publications included journal articles on the lives of the saints and on church plate, Parochiale Wallicanum (1911), an analysis and translation of the Latin text of the Life of St David (1923), and Welsh Christian Origins (1934). He also edited Vitae Sanctorum Britanniae et Genealogiae, an invaluable edition of Welsh saints' lives, mostly from the British Library Manuscript Vespasian A.xiv. He was also a contributor to many journals and newspapers. In 1909, he published Welsh Medieval Law, a translation of Llyfr Cyfnerth; he later wrote an article on Welsh law for the Encyclopædia Britannica.
