= Alice Bures =

Medieval English gentlewoman

The wedding of Isabella and Richard II, mentioned in letters received by Alice

Alice Bures (about 1360-1435), also known by her married name of Alice Brian and sometimes as Alice de Bryene, was an English landowner whose estates were centred on Suffolk. Widowed about age 26, she spent the next 49 years of her life bringing up her two daughters, looking after her household, and running her estates. Some letters she received and some of her household accounts have been published, giving a valuable insight into the life of a well-off gentlewoman in the English countryside at that time.

== Origins ==
Probably born at Acton in Suffolk around 1360, she was the only surviving child of Sir Robert Bures, of Bures St Mary, a landowner, and his wife Joan Sutton, daughter of Sir Richard Sutton, of Navestock. Her paternal grandfather was Sir Andrew Bures, whose widow Alice had married Sir John Sutton, of Wivenhoe, and retained some of the family estates until her death in 1392. Her great-grandfather, Sir Robert Bures, had been a courtier and administrator who owned fifteen estates in East Anglia, most of which passed down to Alice and included Acton, where she spent most of her life.

== Life ==
Her father died in 1361 and in 1363 her widowed mother married Sir Richard Waldegrave, a notable soldier, courtier and politician, and with him had a son, Sir Richard Waldegrave, a half-brother to Alice.

In 1375, aged about 15, she was married to Sir Guy Brian, born about 1352 as the eldest son of Guy Brian, Baron Brian, and his second wife Elizabeth Montagu. Her father-in-law, also a notable soldier, courtier and politician, not only paid her stepfather a considerable sum but also endowed Alice with estates in Dorset and Gloucestershire. The young couple had two daughters before Sir Guy died in Spain in 1386. His body was brought back to be buried at Slapton in Devon and she was executor of his will. She then had to combat attempts to diminish her young daughters' inheritance by her late husband's younger brother, Sir William Brian, and by her father's stepfather, Sir John Sutton.

She owned over 2,400 hectares in East Anglia and the West Country as well as a property in the City of London, much of it leased out but the lands near Acton she managed herself. Entertaining extensively, sometimes gatherings for women friends only, she had a suitor who called often but eventually settled for another rich widow. Well educated, she could write good French and had books in Latin. A probable attender at the court of King Richard II, she housed and educated two girls who were his wards. With her own private chapel and chaplains at Acton, she strictly observed the calendar of the Catholic church.

Her mother died in 1406 and her stepfather in 1410. She died in 1435, aged about 75, and was buried at All Saints church in Acton, where her monumental brass survives.

== Family ==
Her two daughters were:

- Philippa Brian, born about 1378 and died 1406. She married first Sir John Devereux, son of John Devereux, 2nd Baron Devereux, who died in 1396, and secondly Henry Scrope, 3rd Baron Scrope of Masham, who survived her and was executed in 1415. No children are known from either marriage.
- Elizabeth Brian, born and baptised in London in 1381 and dead by 1438, who married Robert Lovell, son of John Lovell, 5th Baron Lovell. He died after 1424, leaving one daughter, Maud Lovell. Maud, born about 1405 and died 1436, married first Sir Richard Stafford, son of Sir Humphrey Stafford, who died about 1427, leaving a daughter, Avice Stafford, born in 1423 in Dorset and died in 1457, who married James Butler, 5th Earl of Ormond, son of James Butler, 4th Earl of Ormond, but left no children. Maud's second husband was John FitzAlan, 7th Earl of Arundel, son of John FitzAlan, 6th Earl of Arundel, who died in France in 1435, leaving a son, Humphrey FitzAlan, born in 1429 and died before reaching his teens in 1438.

Although she lived to see two great-grandchildren born, neither left children and she has no descendants.

== Surviving documents ==
She has been cited in historical studies because of two surviving documents that have been published.

One is a single leaf in French containing copies of eight letters received during the 1390s. These include one from King Richard II, one from John Devereux, 2nd Baron Devereux, whose son John had married her daughter Philippa, two from the younger John written at Calais around 31 October 1396 at the time of the marriage of Richard II to Isabella of Valois, and one from her other son-in-law Robert Lovell.

The other is her household book for the twelve months from October 1412, giving details in Latin of food and drink consumed.

Unpublished but surviving are some stewards' accounts for the manor of Acton and some bailiff's accounts, which illustrate her life and finances and by extension those of contemporaries in a similar position.
