= List of English translations from medieval sources: F–Z =

The list of English translations from medieval sources: F–Z provides an overview of notable medieval documents—historical, scientific, ecclesiastical and literature—that have been translated into English. This includes the original author, translator(s) and the translated document. Translations are from Old and Middle English, Old French, Old Norse, Latin, Arabic, Greek, Persian, Syriac, Ethiopic, Coptic, Armenian, and Hebrew, and most works cited are generally available in the University of Michigan's HathiTrust digital library and OCLC's WorldCat. Anonymous works are presented by topic.

== List of English translations ==
=== G ===
Geoffrey of Monmouth. Geoffrey of Monmouth (1095 – c. 1155) was a Catholic cleric from Monmouth, Wales, and one of the major figures in the development of British historiography and the popularity of tales of King Arthur.

- The History of the Kings of Britain (Historia Regum Britanniae) (c. 1136).

Geography. Medieval works on geography and cartography include the following.

- Compendium of Ancient Geography, 2 volumes (1742). By French geographer and cartographer Jean Baptiste Bourguignon d'Anville (1697–1782). Translated with an interesting discussion on translation. Translated from the French by British antiquarian John Horsley (c. 1685 – 1732) Illustrated with maps, carefully reduced from those of the Paris atlas, in imperial folio; with a map of Roman Britain, and with prolegomena and notes by the translator.
- Contributions to the history of geography (1891–1892), by American Semitic scholar Richard James Horatio Gottheil (1862–1936). In the American journal of Semitic languages and literatures, Volume VII,pp. 39–55, Volume VIII, pp. 65–78.
- A volume in the autograph of Yāqūt the geographer (1951). By Arthur John Arberry (1905–1969), a British orientalist. A brief description of the work of Arab scholar Yaqut al-Hamawi (1179–1229), with a reproduction of the manuscript of the Tamām Fasīh al-kalām of Ahmad ibn Fāris.
- Ptolemy's geography (1908) A brief account of all the printed editions of Ptolemy's Geography down to 1730, with notes on some important variations observed in that of Ulm 1482, including the recent discovery of the earliest printed map of the world yet known on modern geographical conceptions in which some attempt was made to depart from ancient traditions. By Henry Newton Stevens (1855–1930). Now preserved in the library of Edward Everett Ayer (1841–1927).

Gesta Romanorum. Gesta Romanorum (c. early 14th century) is a Latin collection of anecdotes and tales ambiguously translated as Deeds of the Romans. It was one of the most popular books of the time used as source material for Geoffrey Chaucer, William Shakespeare, and others.

- The early English versions of the Gesta Romanorum (1879). First edited by Sir Frederic Madden for the Roxburghe Club, and now re-edited from the manuscripts in the British Museum (Harl. 7333 & Addit. 9066) and University Library, Cambridge (Kk. 1. 6), with introduction, notes, and glossary by Sidney John Hervon Herrtage. In Early English Text Society, Extra Series, 33.

Gilbert, Humphrey. Sir Humphrey Gilbert (c. 1539 – 1583) was an adventurer, explorer, member of parliament and soldier who served during the reign of Elizabeth I of England. He was a pioneer of the English colonial empire in North America and Ireland. He was a maternal half-brother of Sir Walter Raleigh.

- Queene Elizabethes achademy (1869). Edited by English philologist Frederick James Furnivall (1825–1910). In Early English Text Society, Extra Series, 8.

Giovanni de' Marignolli. Giovanni de' Marignolli, known as John of Marignolli (fl. 1338–53), was a notable 14th-century Catholic European traveller to medieval China and India.

- John de Marignolli's recollections of Eastern travel (1338–1353). In Cathay and the way thither: being a collection of medieval notices of China (1913–1916), Volume II, Chapter V. New edition of a translation by Sir Henry Yule (1820–1889), revised by French orientalist Henri Cordier (1849–1925). Printed for the Hakluyt society, Second series, Volumes 33, 37, 38, 41.
- The Minor Friars in China (1917). By British sinologist Arthur Christopher Moule (1873–1957). Extracts from the chronicle of Giovanni de' Marignolli written c. 1354 and letters from the khan to pope Benedict XII, with the pope's replies. In Journal of the Royal Asiatic Society, (1917), pp. 1–36.

Godfrey of Bouillon. Godfrey of Bouillon (1060–1100) was a French nobleman and one of the leaders of the First Crusade. He was the first ruler of the Kingdom of Jerusalem, serving from 1099 to 1100, and using the title Advocatus sancti sepulchri as opposed to king.

- Godeffroy of Boloyne: The siege and conqueste of Jerusalem (1893). By William, archbishop of Tyre (c. 1130 – 1186). Translated from the French by English printer and writer William Caxton (c. 1422 – c. 1491), and printed by him in 1481. Edited from the copy in the British museum, with introduction, notes, vocabulary, and indexes, by Mary Noyes Colvin. Taken from a French translation of William's Historia rerum in partibus transmarinis gestarum (History of Deeds Done Beyond the Sea). In Early English Text Society, Extra series, Volume 64.
- Godfrey of Bulloigne; or, The recovery of Jerusalem (1818). Done into English heroical verse, from the Italian, by English translator Edward Fairfax (c. 1580 –1635). The first complete English translation of La Gerusalemme liberata, by Italian poet Torquato Tasso (1544–1595). The work is a reinvention of the First Crusade, with Godfrey of Bouillon lionized as the ideal military leader, using both the 1464 work of Benedetto Accolti, De Bello a Christianis contra Barbaros, and other available original sources.
- The history of Helyas, Knight of the Swan (1901). Translated by Robert Copland (fl. 1508–1547). The story of the Knight of the Swan (Chevalier au Cygne) is a medieval tale reworked in the Crusader cycle to have the hero a legendary ancestor of Godfrey of Bouillon.
- Legends of Godfrey of Bouillon. In A manual of the writings in Middle English,1050–1400 (1923–1927), Chapter I.4, pp. 95–97. By John Edwin Wells (1875–1943).

Gower, John. John Gower (c. 1330 – 1408) was an English poet, contemporary of the Pearl Poet, and a personal friend of Geoffrey Chaucer. His major works, the Mirour de l'Omme, Vox Clamantis, and Confessio Amantis, are united by common moral and political themes.

- Tales of the seven deadly sins; being the Confessio amantis of John Gower (1889). Edited by English biographer Henry Morley (1822–1894).
- Confessio amantis (2006). Edited by Russell A. Peck and translated by Andrew Galloway. Middle English Texts Society, University of Rochester
- Mirour de l'omme = The mirror of mankind (1992). Translated by William Burton Wilson; revised by Nancy Wilson Van Baak with a foreword by R.F. Yeager.
- The Pearl Poet, Gower. In A manual of the writings in Middle English,1050–1400 (1923–1927), Chapter XV, pp. 578–598. By John Edwin Wells (1875–1943).

Griselda. Griselda is a figure in European folklore noted for her patience and obedience. She appears in Boccaccio's Decameron, Tenth day, Petrarch's Historia Griseldis, and Chaucer's The Clerk's Tale.

- Gualtherus and Griselda, or, The Clerk of Oxford's tale (1741). From Boccace [Boccaccio], Petrarch, and Chaucer. Including: (1) A letter to a friend, with the Clerk of Oxford's character; (2) The Clerk of Oxford's prologue, from Chaucer; (3) The Clerk of Oxford's conclusion, from Petrarch; (4) The declaration, or l'Envoy de Chaucer, a les Maris de notre Temps, from Chaucer; (5) The words of our host, from Chaucer; and, (6) A letter in Latin, from Petrarch to Boccaccio. By English author and translator George Ogle (1704–1746).
- The story of patient Griselda, from the Clerk's tale of Geoffrey Chaucer (1906). Done into modern English with a few notes, by British philologist Rev. Walter William Skeat (1835–1912).
- The story of Griselda: being the tenth story of the tenth day from the Decameron of Messer Giovanni Boccaccio (1909). Translated by James Macmullen Rigg (1855–1926).
- The history of patient Grisel, 1619 (1885). A translation of The Ancient True And Admirable History Of Patient Grisel by Charles Perrault (1628–1703). Edited, with an introduction, by British author Henry B. Wheatley (1838–1917).

=== J ===
Joseph of Exeter. Joseph of Exeter (fl. 12th century) was a Latin poet from England.

- De bello Troiano, a Latin poem written around 1183 about the Trojan War. Sources were the fictional diaries of Dictys of Crete and Dares of Phrygia. Translated by A. G. Rigg.
- Antiocheis, an epic poem in Latin written after 1190 upon his return from the Third Crusade. The poem is lost, except for a single fragment of 21 lines quoted by William Camden in his miscellany Remains Concerning Britain.

=== L ===
Lambeth Palace Library Ms. 853. A collection of 15th century courtesies and hymn in the Lambeth Place Library. The works below are edited by English philologist Frederick James Furnivall (1825–1910) and a part of the publications of the Early English Text Society (EETS), Original or Extra Series. The contents of ms. 853 are in Hymns to the Virgin & Christ, pp. xiiix-xiv.

- Hymns to the Virgin & Christ, the Parliament of devils, and other religious poems: chiefly from the Archbishop of Canterbury's Lambeth ms. no. 853 (1867–1896). EETS, OS 24. Includes: Surge mea sponsa; poems to Christ; The Deuelis perlament; The world is false and vain; Earth; Reuertere; Merci passith Rightness; the Belief; Ten Commandments; the 16 points of charity;
- Political, religious, and love poems (1866–1903). EETS, OS 15.
- The Babees book: Early English Meals and Manners (1838). EETS, OS 32.
- Queene Elizabethes achademy (by Sir Humphrey Gilbert) (1879). EETS, ES 8.

Lefèvre, Raoul. Raoul Lefèvre (fl. 1460) was the French author of the Recuyell of the historyes of Troye (1464), the first English printed book. Lefèvre served as the chaplain of Philip the Good (1396–1467), Duke of Burgundy and the creator of the chivalrous Order of the Golden Fleece.

- The recuyell of the historyes of Troye (1894). Written in French, and translated and printed by William Caxton, c. 1474. Reproduced with a critical introduction, index and glossary, and eight pages in photographic facsimile, by Heinrich Oskar Sommer (born 1861).
- The History of Jason (1913). Translated from the French by William Caxton. Edited by John James Munro. In Early English Text Society, Extra Series, 111.
- Stair Ercuil focus a bas, the life and death of Hercules (1939). Translated and edited by Ernest Gordon Quin. Adapted from the last part of Volume I and all of Volume II of The recuyell of the historyes of Troye. Published by the Irish Texts Society, Volume 38.

=== P ===
Paynell, Thomas. Thomas Paynell (fl. 1528–1564) was an English Augustinian and translator.

Paris, Matthew. Matthew Paris.

- The life of St. Edmund (1996). Translated, edited and with a biography by C. H. Lawrence. A French-verse history of the life of Edmund Rich, Archbishop of Canterbury from 1233 to 1240. Based on Paris's own Latin prose life of Rich, composed in the late 1240s, which drew on a collection of materials made at Pontigny, statements from Robert Bacon and Richard Wych, Bishop of Chichester, and other materials including from Paris's own histories.

=== R ===
Ragnar Lodbrok. Ragnar Lodbrok (d. ca 865).

- The Volsunga saga (1906). Translated from the Icelandic by Eirikr Magnusson and William M. [sic] Morris; with introduction by H. Halliday Sparling; Rasmus B. Anderson, editor in chief. The Völsunga saga includes the story of Sigurd and Brunhild, and, most famously, Sigurd killing the serpent/dragon Fáfnir and obtaining the cursed ring Andvaranaut that Fáfnir guarded. In this manuscript, the saga leads straight in to Ragnars saga loðbrókarT
- he saga of the Volsungs: The saga of Ragnar Lodbrok, together with The lay of Kraka (1930). Translated by Margaret Schlauch.

Roberts, Peter. Peter Roberts (c. 1760–1819) was a Welsh Anglican divine and antiquary.

- Sketch of the Early History of the Cymry (1803). A history of the Britons from 700 BC to 500 AD.
- Chronicle of the Kings of Britain (1811). A translation of the Welsh version by Tysilio of Geoffrey of Monmouth, with illustrative dissertations.
- Cambrian Popular Antiquities (1815). An account of some traditions, customs, and superstitions, of Wales, with observations as to their origin.

=== S ===
Snorri Sturluson. Snorri Sturluson (1179 – 22 September 1241) was an Icelandic historian, poet, and politician.

- Northern antiquities; or, An historical account of the manners, customs, religion and laws, maritime expeditions and discoveries, language and literature of the ancient Scandinavians (1847). Translated from the French of Paul Henri Mallet, by Bishop Thomas Percy.
- The prose or younger Edda commonly ascribed to Snorri Sturluson (1842). Translated from the Old Norse by George Webbe Dasent.
- The younger Edda, also called Snorre's Edda of the prose Edda (1880). An English version of the foreword; the fooling of Gylfe, the afterword; Brage's talk, the afterword to Brage's talk, and the important passages in the Poetical diction (Skaldskaparmal). With an introduction, notes, vocabulary and index by Rasmus B. Anderson.
- The Prose Edda, by Snorri Sturluson (1916). Translated from the Icelandic, with an introduction, by Arthur Gilchrist Brodeur.

=== W ===
Widsith. Widsith, also known as The Traveller's Song, is an Old English poem of 143 lines. It survives only in the Exeter Book.

- Widsith, a study in Old English heroic legend (1912). By Raymond Wilson Chambers.
- English literature from Widsith to the death of Chaucer: a source book (1916).[1] By Allen Rogers Benham.

== Source material ==
- A general history and collection of voyages and travels to the end of the eighteenth century
- Crusader Texts in Translation
- Early English Text Society
- Hakluyt Society publications
- Irish Texts Society
- Modern philology

== See also ==
- Annals
- Arabic literature
- Islamic literature
- Medieval literature
