= Emma Gurney Salter =

English Renaissance historian and translator (1865–1967)

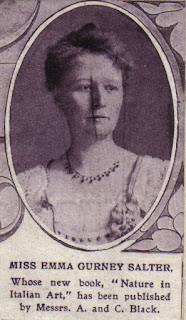
Dr Emma Gurney Salter in 1912

Emma Gurney Salter (1875–1967) was an English historian and translator who wrote especially on Renaissance history and art and introduced several texts connected with Francis of Assisi to an English-speaking audience for the first time.

== Life ==
She was the daughter of William Henry Gurney Salter, who was official shorthand writer to the Houses of Parliament.

She attended Notting Hill and Ealing High School from 1886 and then took the Classics tripos at Girton College, Cambridge. With the University of Cambridge not awarding degrees to women at that time, she received her M.A. and her D.Litt. from Trinity College, Dublin.

== Select works ==
=== Author ===
- Franciscan Legends in Italian Art (1905)
- Nature in Italian Art (1912)
- Tudor England through Venetian Eyes (1930)

=== Translator ===
- The Legend of St Francis by the Three Companions (1902)
- The Life of St Francis by Bonaventure (1904)
- The Coming of the Friars Minor to England and Germany by Thomas of Eccleston and Jordan of Giano (1926)
- The Vision of God by Nicolaus of Cusa (1928)
