= The Letter Of Roger Bacon Concerning The Marvelous Power Of Art And Nature And The Nullity Of Magic =

13th-century work by Roger Bacon

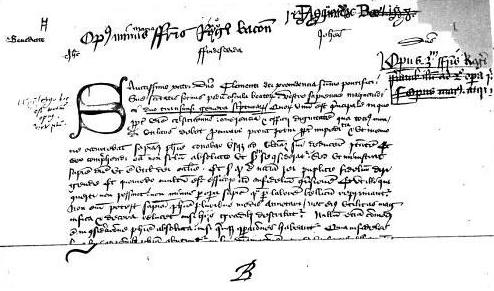
- A page from The Letter
- Author: Roger Bacon
- Original title: Epistola fratris Rogerii Baconis de secretis operibus artis et naturae, et de nullitate magiae
- Language: Latin
- Genre: Epistolary literature
- Publication date: 1267

The Letter Of Roger Bacon Concerning The Marvelous Power Of Art And Nature And The Nullity Of Magic (Latin: Epistola fratris Rogerii Baconis de secretis operibus artis et naturae, et de nullitate magiae) is a work on the technical applications of natural phenomena and speculative designs for future mechanisms. According to Simon Singh, it is the first European book that systematically outlines the principles of cryptography. Most scholars attribute the authorship to Franciscan monk Roger Bacon, an English philosopher and natural scientist of the mid-13th century.

The Letter is the concluding work in a series by Roger Bacon aimed at compiling contemporary mathematical, physical, and linguistic knowledge, while establishing clear distinctions between magic, religion, and what later became technical and humanistic sciences. The Letter also includes reflections on the education and moral qualities of the clergy. Some of Bacon's philosophical and theological positions were deemed heretical by the Catholic Church, leading to his imprisonment. However, there is no definitive evidence that the Letter directly contributed to his incarceration.

== History of creation ==
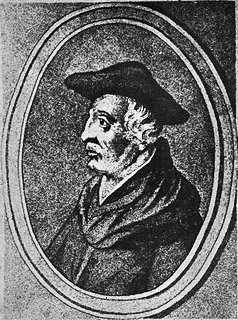
Portrait of Roger Bacon

Around 1257, Bacon joined the Franciscan Order, hoping for support in his scientific pursuits. Instead, he faced restrictions from senior members of the order, who, from 1257 to 1267, prohibited him from publishing books due to suspicions of engaging in black arts or witchcraft, as evidenced by Bacon's letters to the Pope, which yielded no results. While in Paris, Bacon sought support from Cardinal Guy de Foulques, requesting financial and ideological backing for his work. The cardinal expressed interest in reviewing Bacon's writings, but at that time, Bacon had no completed works on church or educational reform. No records indicate progress on these works in the following years.

In February 1265, Guy de Foulques became Pope Clement IV, and Bacon renewed his appeal, sending a letter through William Bonecor. On June 22, 1266, Bacon received a response in which the Pope reiterated his request for Bacon's writings and urged him to reveal to us your remedies for the important issues you recently brought to our attention, as quickly and confidentially as possible. The works were to be sent immediately and in secret from the Franciscan Order. The Pope expected Bacon to provide a plan for reforming education and clerical life. Bacon wrote that the Pope was mistaken in thinking the work was already written, adding that nothing worthy of His Holiness had been created, and everything had to begin anew.

Bacon attempted to create a series of books systematizing various fields of knowledge. However, after working on General Mathematics and Laws of Nature, he deemed the project unfeasible and focused on four works: Opus Majus, Opus Secundum, Opus Minus, Opus Tertium, Compendium Studii Philosophiae, and the Letter Of Roger Bacon Concerning The Marvelous Power Of Art And Nature And The Nullity Of Magic (1267). Opinions on the dating of the Letter vary: some researchers, like Colonel Hime, date it to 1248, while others, based on changes in Bacon's philosophical and scientific views in the 1240s–1250s, dismiss this as implausible. A comprehensive source, Biographia Britannica, suggests, based on specific phrases, that most of the work was written in the years leading up to 1267, with the final two chapters added later.

Ultimately, Bacon compiled a collection of works providing a concise overview of various sciences, from the rationale for studying linguistics and mathematics to practical guides for their foundations. The Letter specifically aimed to distinguish low-class magic, as understood at the time, from science. The overarching goal, as envisioned by the Pope, was to elevate the authority of exact sciences among the clergy and encourage their in-depth study in universities and missionary circles.

By the time Bacon completed his work, Clement IV had died, and in 1278, Bacon was arrested by the Franciscan Order's general, Girolamo Masci d'Ascoli (later Pope Nicholas IV), and imprisoned for heresy, specifically for criticizing the clergy's ignorance, accusing Church members of failing to uphold Christian dogmas, and freely interpreting Christian doctrine. Historians estimate his imprisonment lasted between 2 and 14 years. However, American researcher Singer argues that Bacon's works were neither anti-religious nor corrupting to Christian faith, suggesting personal animosity within the Franciscan Order toward Bacon. Scholars note Bacon's fearless critique of the clergy, cardinals, the Pope, Franciscans, Dominicans, and the Vulgate, as well as inaccuracies in the works of Aristotle and Church scholars, which likely earned him many enemies. His interest in alchemy and astrology further discredited his work, delaying recognition of his discoveries until centuries later. The first complete edition of his works appeared in 1897.

According to the English Cyclopaedia, the original text of Bacon's works was significantly altered by Bacon himself after his accusation and arrest.

== Content of the book ==
In a brief preface, Bacon expresses admiration for the power of nature, stating that only the art of harnessing nature surpasses it.

The opening section, "Against the False Invocation of Spirits", comprises two chapters. The first debunks ventriloquists and tricksters who pass off sleight of hand, mechanical, or optical instruments as miracles, or mimic animal voices. It reveals the secret behind telekinesis tricks performed at dusk or night, using light and shadow. The second chapter refutes the reality of spiritualist séances from a philosophical perspective, arguing that spirits either will not interact with humans or will not aid in base pursuits due to the inferiority of human power compared to spirits.

The section "On Songs, Signs, and Their Uses" includes six chapters exposing various forms of divination, predictions, and charms. In "Symbols, Signs, and Magical Rituals," Bacon rejects the supernatural power of mysterious signs in sages' books, suggesting they are encrypted descriptions of natural laws meant to remain secret. He considers only fools attribute magical power to obscure formulas. "Some Affairs of Church Authorities" criticizes clergy engaging in divination with holy water or heated iron, particularly to determine guilt in cases of adultery or murder. In "Magical Books," Bacon advocates destroying books falsely attributed to renowned sages due to their deceitful content and poor style, supporting the Church's stance on works supposedly by King Solomon. "Magic of Numbers" dismisses sciences based on the magical power of numbers, criticizing those who assign sacred meaning to digits outside a scientific context. "Magic of the Stars" addresses astrology, noting that few works on celestial motion are reliable due to their authors' lack of mathematical knowledge. Finally, "Charms in Medical Practice" cites Avicenna to argue that words or signs uttered by physicians are not supernatural but can inspire hope and confidence in patients, indirectly aiding recovery.

The section "Nullity of Magic" discusses natural mechanisms Bacon deems true miracles. "Species, Ideas, or External Qualities of Things" lists wonders from animal and plant life considered scientific facts at the time, such as a wolf silencing a human if seen first or women with four pupils killing with a glance, supported by references to Ovid, Aristotle, and others. "Power of Personality" explores how human thoughts and emotions influence the material world, spreading health or disease, emphasizing Christian self-improvement. "Power of the Word" contrasts the divine power of wise words with the ineffectiveness of magical incantations, suggesting vocal vibrations carry a "spiritual warmth" affecting objects and people. Bacon concludes the first half of the book by asserting that the actions of pseudo-magical books, false scholars, and fraudulent sorcerers are trivial compared to the capabilities of nature wielded by a healthy, divinely inspired person.

The second part of the book begins with "On the Wondrous Art of Instruments", a single chapter, "Mechanical Devices," where Bacon envisions ships controlled by one person, high-speed vehicles, aircraft, devices for safe underwater movement, and early mentions of submarines. He predicts devices for flight with artificial wings, lifting heavy objects, and self-propelled chariots.

The section "On the Wondrous Art of Perspective" covers optics. "Magical Mirrors" describes mirror systems creating illusions of armies or vast spaces on small devices. "Optical Devices with Various Focuses" discusses tools for magnifying objects close-up or at a distance, burning objects with focused light, and reflecting the heavens in miniature.

The section "On Wondrous Experiments" focuses on chemistry. "Combustible Compositions" explores eternal lamps and warm baths using amber and niter. "Gunpowder" describes its explosive potential and includes an anagram, "Luru Vopo Vir Can Utriet," encoding its formula. "Working Model of the Heavens" discusses Ptolemy's model for predicting celestial events. "Alloying Gold" speculates on synthesizing pure gold.

The section "On Delaying Old Age and Prolonging Human Life" explores longevity. "Lifespan" cites cases of extended life using oils, stones, and animal parts. "Healthcare" advocates balanced living to preserve health, attributing declining lifespans to accumulated sins.

The section "On Concealing the Secrets of Nature and Art" addresses cryptography. "Wisdom of Keeping Secrets" emphasizes protecting natural laws from misuse. "Ignorance of the Masses" argues that the uneducated misinterpret knowledge. "Seven Ways to Conceal a Secret" lists seven encryption methods.

The final section, "On Creating the Philosophical Egg", describes three methods for preparing the philosophical egg, a symbol of primary matter in alchemy, through processes like sublimation and oxidation.

== Authorship of the final chapters ==
The authorship of chapters 7–11 has been questioned by British researcher Charles Fontaine, due to chronological inconsistencies, such as references to questions asked in 601 (1205–1206 CE) and 608 (1212–1213 CE) of the Islamic calendar, predating Bacon's birth. Some editions correct these to 621 or 688. Romocki suggests scribal errors, proposing 661 (1257 CE) and 668 (1265–1266 CE), aligning with Bacon's reference in Opus Tertium to a letter sent ten years earlier.

== Manuscripts, publications, and translations ==
=== Manuscripts ===
According to James Partington, the original manuscript survives only partially in Oxford Tanner 116, covering chapters 1–5 and part of 6. The full text was compiled in the 15th century in Sloane MS. 2156. Other manuscripts include Oxford Digby 164 (15th century, chapters 1–9) and Voss MS. at Leiden (16th century).

=== Editions and translations ===
==== In Latin ====
The first printed edition appeared in 1542 by Oronce Finé. A 1594 Oxford edition was edited by Joseph Barnes. In 1618, Hamburg published an edition with notes by John Dee.

==== In English ====
The first English translation, An Excellent Discourse of the Admirable Force and Efficacie of Art and Nature, by Frier Bacon, was published in 1597 in Oxford. In 1659, "Frier Bacon his Discovery of the Miracles of Art, Nature and Magic" appeared. A 1923 Easton translation by Tenney L. Davis included commentary.

==== In French ====
The first French edition, De L'admirable Povvoir et Pvissance de l'art, et de nature, was published in Lyon in 1557. A 1893 Paris edition by A. Poisson followed.

==== In German ====
A 1613 Basel edition and a 1750 Vienna edition appeared, followed by a 1776 translation by Hamberger.

==== In Russian ====
In 2005, Moscow published a translation of Opus Majus and the first eight chapters of the Letter, edited by Ivan Lupandin.

== Relevance of the book ==
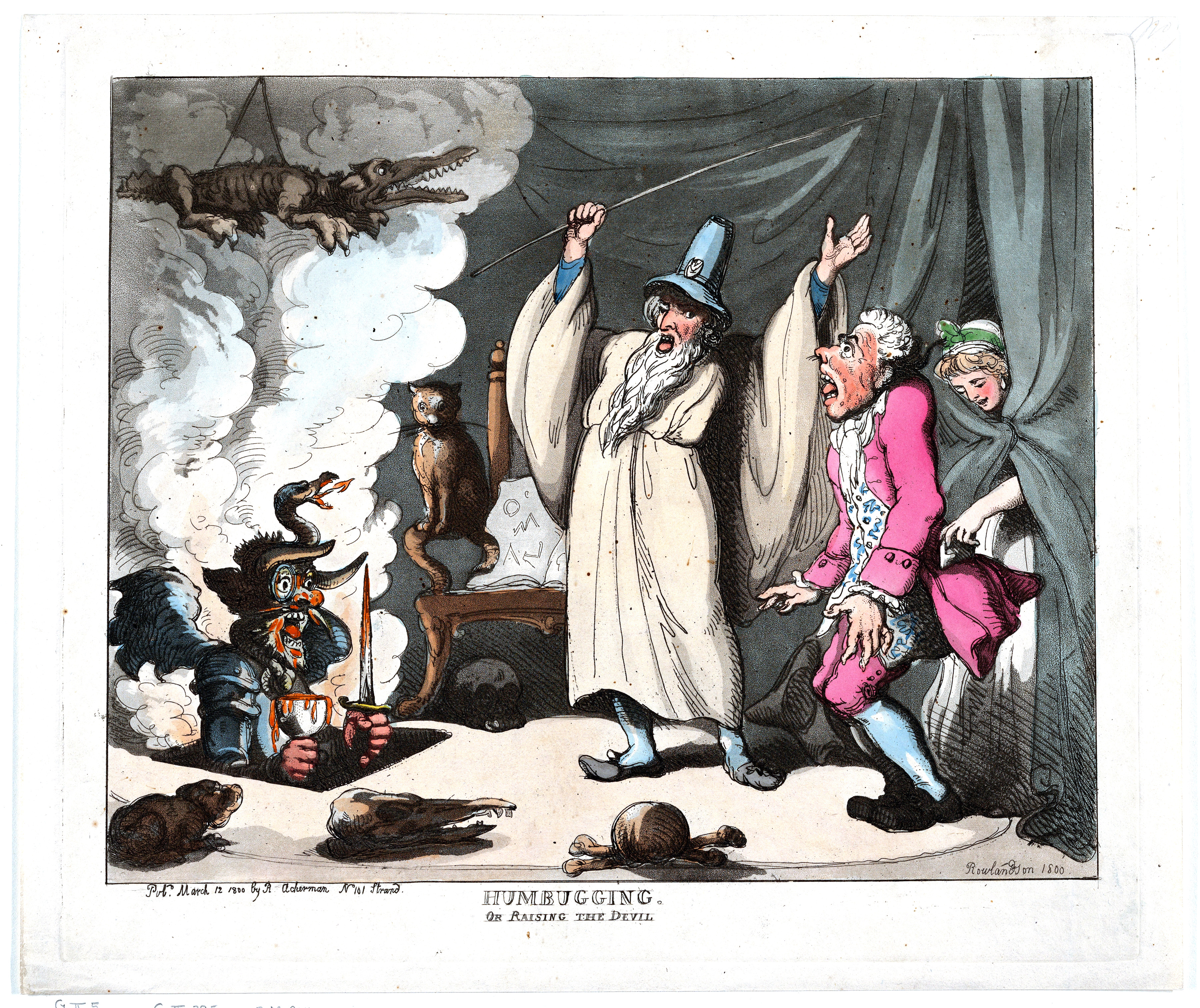
The Devil's Exaltation, 1800, by Thomas Rowlandson

The Letter has captivated researchers for eight centuries due to its harmonious coexistence of magic and science. It connects Bacon's works on mathematics, natural science, philosophy, and theology, establishing hierarchies and parallels, embodying the medieval struggle between magic, science, and religion. Historian John Rose names Bacon among the six greatest figures in history as a philosopher, theologian, scientist, and writer. However, early 21st-century scholars view Bacon's scientific contributions as limited due to their fragmentary nature.

The book's historical and scientific relevance lies in its empirical facts and philosophical reflections, including Bacon's concept of spiritual experience or intuition as part of scientific discovery, a precursor to heuristics and intuition in science.

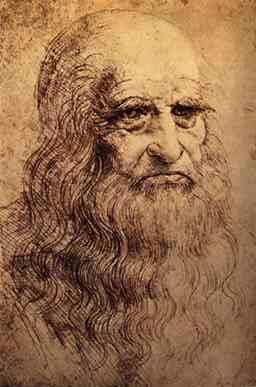
Leonardo da Vinci

The chapter "On the Wondrous Art of Instruments" anticipates Leonardo da Vinci's designs, predicting submarines, scuba gear, cars, and jacks. Bacon's famous quote, "Of the three ways by which people suppose they acquire knowledge of things—authority, reasoning, and experience — only the last can bring order to the mind", reflects his emphasis on empiricism.

Theses from Opus Majus on shipbuilding and navigation from Spain to India inspired Christopher Columbus, influencing his letter to Ferdinand II of Aragon and Isabella I of Castile, contributing to the discovery of the Americas.

The 1914 University of California publication and Tenney L. Davis's 1923 work detail Bacon's evolving views from empiricism to intuition, his complex relationship with the Church, and aspects of his personality.

== Description of gunpowder in the Letter ==
According to James Partington, the most famous part of the Letter is the gunpowder formula in chapter 11. Brewer summarize it as a mix from saltpeter LURU VOPO VIR CAN UTRIET sulfur, that will make thunder and lightning, if a man knows the art.

A scholar Hime rearranged the anagram to RVIIPARTVNOUCORUVLET, interpreting it as a recipe VII PARTes, V NOVellae CORULi, V ET sulphuris, translating as an instruction of taking 7 parts saltpeter, 5 parts young charcoal, and 5 parts sulfur. Davis suggests using 6 parts saltpeter for consistency with earlier statements.

Clement interprets some letters differently, proposing "pulveris carbonum tritorum" (ground charcoal) Steele notes the 1542 edition by Oronce Finé struggled with illegible manuscript symbols.

Partington suggests Bacon may have drawn gunpowder knowledge from Arabic sources.

== The Letter as the first European book on cryptography ==
The section "On Concealing the Secrets of Nature and Art" is significant as the first European written source on cryptography. It outlines seven encryption methods, including symbol substitution, figurative expressions, consonant-only writing, mixed alphabets, invented scripts, pictographic alphabets with hidden markers, and text abbreviation. Bacon's cryptography influenced speculation about his authorship of the Voynich Manuscript, though this was disproven by radiocarbon dating.

== Interpretation of Bacon's ideas in the 19th–20th centuries ==
In the 19th century, Bacon was seen as a visionary experimenter, as per Betham. Later research showed many of his facts were known earlier, and medieval Christians were not broadly anti-science, diminishing his scientific significance. His intuitive approach echoed Robert Grosseteste's verification methods. Bacon's call for reform, per Vinogradov and Power, was an apocalyptic appeal to the Pope to improve missionary training against the Antichrist.

Edmund Brehm compared Bacon's alchemical views to Tantric yoga, suggesting alchemy was a path to longevity and spiritual liberation, akin to Madhva's teachings. Bacon's work bridged ancient alchemical traditions and the 14th-century European hermetic revival.
