= Jean Tixier =

Jean Tixier may refer to:

- Jean Max Tixier (1935–2009), French poet
- Jean-Louis Tixier-Vignancour (1907–1989), French lawyer and politician; 1965 presidential candidate
- Jean Tixier de Ravisi (c. 1480–1524), French Renaissance humanist, author, and scholar; former rector of the University of Paris

== See also ==
- Tixier (disambiguation)
