= Tixier =

Tixier is a French surname.

Tixier may refer to:

- Scott Tixier (b. 1986), French jazz violinist
- Tony Tixier (b. 1986), French jazz pianist
- Damien Tixier (b. 1980), French professional football player, playing for Switzerland
- Jean Max Tixier (1935–2009), French poet
- Raymond Tixier (1912–1940), French Olympic field hockey player
- Jean-Louis Tixier-Vignancour (1907–1989), French lawyer and politician; 1965 presidential candidate
- Adrien Tixier (1893–1946), French politician and teacher
- Jean Tixier de Ravisi (c. 1480–1524), French Renaissance humanist, author, and scholar; former rector of the University of Paris
- Jordi Tixier (born 1991), French motocross rider
