= John Hamilton (controversialist) =

John Hamilton (c.1547–1611) was a Scottish Catholic controversial writer, Rector of the University of Paris, and prominent supporter of the Catholic League.

== Life ==
He was the son of Thomas Hamilton of Orchartfield, and the brother of Thomas Hamilton, lord Priestfield, the father of Thomas Hamilton, 1st Earl of Haddington. A supporter of Mary, Queen of Scots in the civil war in Scotland, he went in 1573 to Paris to teach philosophy, and was appointed to teach philosophy in the Collège de Navarre.

In 1576 he became tutor to the Cardinal de Bourbon, and in 1578 to François de Joyeuse. He was chosen rector of the university of Paris on 17 October 1584. In the following year he was commended by the students forming the German nation to the cure of the parish of St. Côme. His title was disputed before the parliament of Paris, but was decided in his favour. One of the objections to him was that he could not speak Latin nor French, but Louis Servin, his advocate, asserted that he was ready to prove his knowledge of both. He was then only a student in theology, and did not become master till 1586.

Hamilton became one of the most prominent members of the Catholic League, especially during the resistance to Henry IV of France. He wrote a preface, dated from 'Saint Cosme' on the last day of March, to 'Remonstrance faicte en l'Assemblée Générale des Colonnels, Cappitaines, Lieutenans & Enseignes de la Ville de Paris,’ by Monsieur de Saint-Yon, 1590. When Henry besieged Paris Hamilton acted as adjutant, or sergeant-of-battle, of the thirteen hundred ecclesiastics who on 14 May 1590 were reviewed in good order. Hamilton was one of the representatives of the Sixteen of Paris who offered the crown to Philip II of Spain. The society also decreed the death of Brissot, president of the parliament of Paris, and of L'Archer and Tardif, two of the councillors. When Tardif could not be found Hamilton brought him to the execution chamber.

When Henry entered Paris in 1594 Hamilton was apprehended with a halberd in his hand about to join those resisting the king; but though the other ringleaders were executed, he succeeded in escaping to Brussels. In his absence he was condemned to be broken on the wheel for the murder of Tardif, and the sentence was executed on his effigy. About 1600 he and the Jesuit John Hay returned to Scotland on a secret mission. On 24 November 1600 a proclamation was issued by the king James VI and council against Hamilton and Hay. On 22 June 1601 an act was passed against resetting them, but for several years they not only succeeded in eluding capture, but even in holding frequent meetings in different parts of the country for the celebration of the mass and other catholic services. His nephew Thomas Hamilton, 1st Earl of Haddington was then effectively at the head of the justiciary of Scotland, and Andrew Melville to his face accused him of screening John Hamilton (M'Crie, Life of Melville, 2nd ed. ii. 146–7). He was, however, finally captured in 1608, and on 30 August of that year Sir Alexander Hay desired the lieutenant of the Tower of London to receive two priests, Hamilton and Paterson, sent by the Earl of Dunbar. Hamilton died in prison.

== Works ==
In 1581 Hamilton published at Paris 'Ane Catholik and Facile Traictise, Drauin out of the halie Scriptures, treulie exponit be the ancient doctores, to confirme the real and corporell praesence of Chrystis pretious bodie and blude in the sacrament of the alter.' It was dedicated to Queen Mary, and appended to it were 'twenty-four Orthodox and Catholic conclusions' dedicated to James VI, containing 'Certan Questions to the quhilks we desire the Ministers mak resolute answer at the next General Assemblie.' This letter was answered by William Fowler. It was probably as preparatory to his return to Scotland that he published at Louvain in 1600 'A Facile Traictise, contenand, first: ane infallible reul to discerne trevv from fals religion: Nixt a declaration of the Nature, Numbre, Vertevv and effects of the Sacraiments: togider vvith certaine Prayers of deuotion. Dedicat to his Sovereain Prince the kings Maiestie of Scotland, King Iames the Sext. Be Maistre Ihone Hamilton, Doctor in Theologie in Brussels.' His controversial writings contain extravagant calumnies against the reformers and their commerce with the Devil.
