= William Manderstown =

Scottish philosopher and Rector of the University of Paris

William Manderstown (c.1485–1552, also spelled Manderston) was a Scottish philosopher and Rector of the University of Paris.

== Life ==
He was born in the diocese of St. Andrews, probably at the town of Manderston, Stirlingshire. Educated apparently at St. Andrews, he then attended the University of Paris, where he graduated licentiate in medicine, and became one of the school of Terminists (at whose head was John Mair). On 15 December 1525, he succeeded Jean Tixier de Ravisi as rector of the University of Paris. Before 1539 he returned to Scotland, where he and John Mair co-founded a bursary or chaplaincy in St. Salvator's, and endowed it with the rents of houses in South Street, St. Andrews. On 3 April in the same year, Manderstown witnessed a charter at Dunfermline Monastery. He also served as rector in Gogar.

== Works ==
In 1519, with George Lokert and Gervasius Waim, he edited the Quaestiones ac decisiones physicales of Albert of Saxony.

In 1518 Manderstown published at Paris two works, Bipartitum in Morali Philosophia Opusculum, dedicated to Andrew Forman, and Tripartitum Epithoma Doctrinale; in the latter he was later said to have plagiarised from Jérôme de Hangest. Besides these, Thomas Tanner attributes to Manderstown: 1. In Ethicam Aristotelis ad Nicomachum Comment; 2. Quæstionem de Futuro Contingenti; 3. De Arte Chymica.
