= List of rectors of the University of Paris =

This is a list of rectors of the University of Paris (the Sorbonne), a foundation of the middle of the twelfth century with a charter from 1200. The office of rector emerged in the middle of the thirteenth century. Since the rector, initially the "rector of the nations", was elected by the students and faculty, his position was very different from the appointed chancellor of the university (who was in fact the ecclesiastical chancellor of Notre Dame de Paris, whose power came to be divided also with the chancellor of the Abbey of St Genevieve). The rector became the representative of the faculty of the arts; it required another century for the recognition of the rector as representing also the other three faculties (law, medicine and theology). From the middle of the fourteenth century the rector had the status of head of the university, but limited powers.

The rectorship for most of its history was an elected position, of high academic prestige, and held in practice for a single term of one year. The formal position was that the term was of three months, so in some years there were several rectors elected. In the medieval and early Renaissance periods many holders of the post were from outside France. The reorganization of 1970 divided the historical university into thirteen parts. The office of rector still exists, with title Recteur de l'Académie de Paris.

== 13th century ==
- Guillaume de Saint-Amour
- 1271 Alberic of Reims (election disputed, and a chaotic period of opposition by Siger of Brabant follows)
- 1275 Peter of Auvergne
- 1296 Peter of Auvergne

== 14th century ==
- 1304 Guillelmus Brito
- 1313 Marsilius of Padua
- 1326 Petrus de Dacia
- 1327 Jean Buridan
- 1340 Jean Buridan (second term)
- 1348 Olivier Saladin, bishop of Nantes
- 1350 Jean de Muris
- 1351 Jean Diacre
- 1353 Albert of Saxony
- 1355 Vojtěch Raňkův of Ježov
- 1367 Marsilius of Inghen
- 1371 Marsilius of Inghen (second term)
- 1378 Guillaume Gorran
- 1381 Mathieu Regnauld
- 1383 Jean Voignon
- 1393-5 Mathieu-Nicolas Poillevillain de Clémanges (Nicholas of Clamanges)
- 1395 (October–December), Walter Forrester (future bishop of Brechin)

== 15th century ==
- 1401 (June) Jacques de Nouvion
- 1403 Pierre Cauchon
- 1405 Gérard de Machet
- 1409 Jean de Beaumont
- 1412 Jean Beaupère
- 1428 Pierre Maurice
- 1430 Thomas de Courcelles
- 1435 Olavi Maununpoika (Olavus Magni), bishop of Turku
- 1439 Guillaume Bouillé
- 1442 Jehan Pluyette
- 1448 Jehan Pluyette
- 1458 Johannes Versoris
- 1467 Guillaume Fichet
- 1468 Johannes Heynlin known as De La Pierre or Lapidanus
- 1469 John Ireland
- 1473 Cantien Hue
- 1479 Martin de Delft
- 1485 Jan Standonck
- 1485 (October–December) Johannes Molitor
- 1486 Gillis van Delft
- 1489 Jean Lanternant, Johann Lantmann
- 1491 Guillaume Cappel
- 1492 Bernard Roillet
- 1494 Adam Pluyette

== 16th century ==
- 1507-8 Jacques Almain
- 1513 Girolamo Aleandro
- 1514? Gilles de Maizières (Aegidius Maserius)
- 1519 Jean Finet
- 1519 Gervasius Waim
- 1520 Jean Tixier de Ravisi (c. 1480–1524)
- 1525 William Manderston
- 1528 (March–June) Nicholas Boissel
- 1528 Bertinus Myss
- 1531 Landéric Maciot
- 1531 Jean de Gagny
- 1533 Nicolas Cop
- 1534 André de Gouveia
- 1539 Antoine de Mouchy
- 1540 Claude D'Espence
- 1540 Simon Vigor
- 1560 Claude Roillet
- 1564 Michel Marescot
- 1581 Jean Boucher
- 1584 John Hamilton
- 1586 Jean Filesac
- 1594 Jacques d'Amboise
- Guillaume Rose, bishop of Senlis
- Guy de Saint-Paul
- 1596-1600 John Fraser clerical prior of Beauly Priory 1573–1579, Abbot of Noyon France 1580–1590, Bn 1544, Philorth, Scotland, unanimously elected Rector

== 17th century ==
- 1600-9 John Fraser died 15/16 April (Easter Sunday) 1609 : buried at the Church of the Franciscans, Paris, France
- 1646-8 Godefroy Hermant
- 1694 Charles Rollin

== 18th century ==
- 1701 Micheál Ó Mordha (Michael Moore, orMoor)
- Guillaume Dagomer
- 1707-8 Balthazar Gibert, also 1721–3, 1733-6
- 1713, 1717 Michel Godeau
- Edmond Pourchot, seven times rector
- 1719 Charles Rollin (second term)
- 1748 Jean-Baptiste Cochet
- 1789 Jean-Baptiste Dumouchel, constitutional bishop of Nîmes in 1790
