= The Buik of Alexander =

Two Scots versions of the Alexander romance

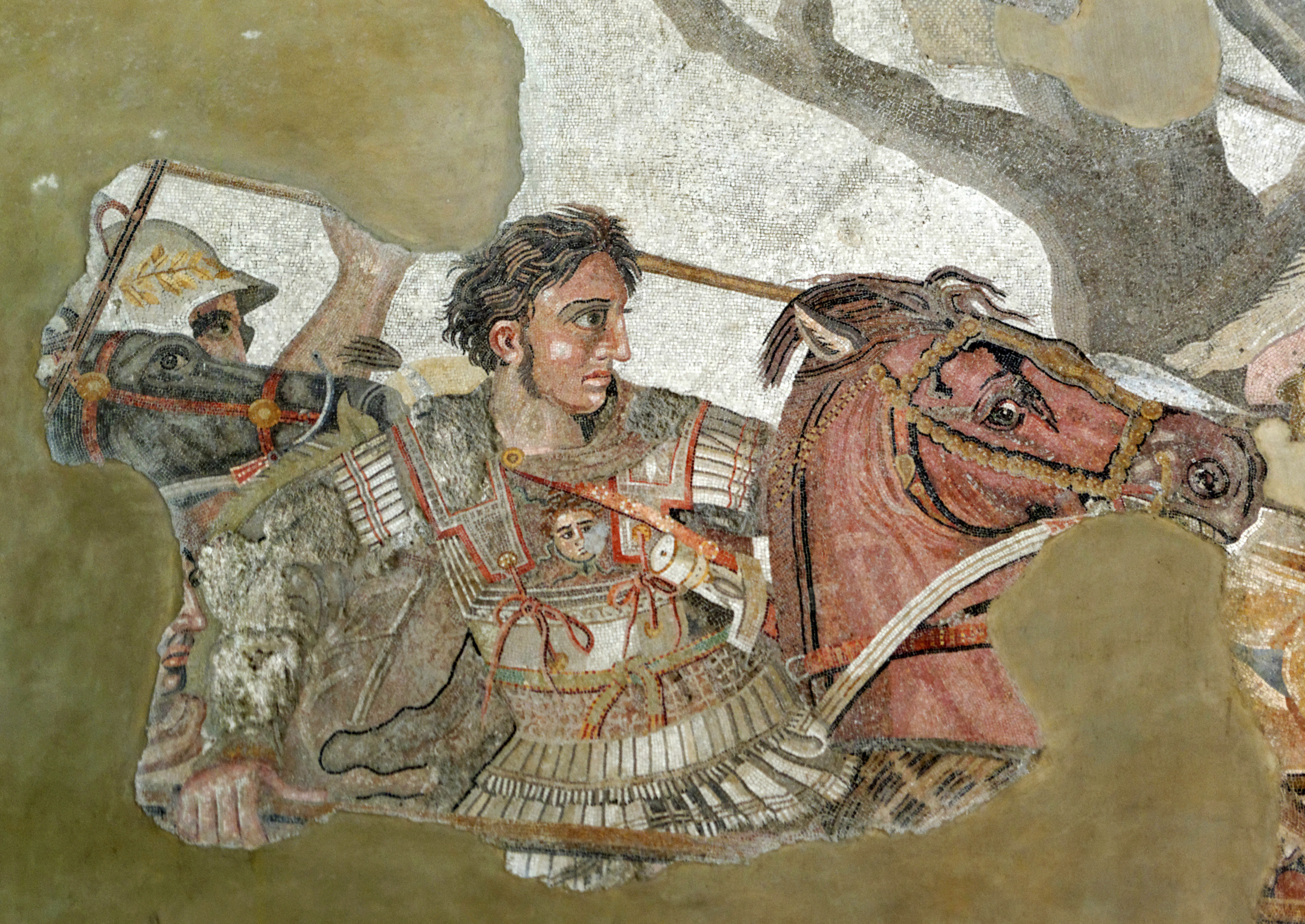
Alexander the Great

The Buik of Alexander is a short title for the two known Scots versions of the Alexander romance stories — a genre which was common in Medieval European literature, particularly France from the 12th century onwards, and the British Isles in the 14th and 15th centuries. A principal source text for these was the Old French text, Li romans d'Alixandre, attributed to Alexandre de Bernay, although writers tended to adapt material freely from different sources. Many different European nations had poets who produced versions of the romance. The dating is unsure, but the earlier of the two Scottish versions was anonymous (dated c.1438), and the second, in a version dated c.1499, is by Gilbert Hay.

== Anonymous version ==
The earlier of the two versions from Scotland is the anonymous The Scots Buik of the most noble and vailyzeand Conqueror Alexander the Great. A few witnesses have tried to ascribe the text of this to the seminal Scots poet John Barbour and some of its passages certainly use material from The Brus, an original verse romance, and Barbour's most famous poem. The sole witness for this Buik of Alexander, however, is a single version printed at the Edinburgh press of Alexander Arbuthnot, c. 1580. It gives the date of its source as 1438, some forty years after Barbour's death.

== Gilbert Hay's version ==
The second surviving Scottish work in the genre is The Buik of King Alexander the Conquerour composed by the poet, Gilbert Hay.
