= John Ireland (theologian) =

John Ireland or Irland (c. 1440 – 1495), also known as Johannes de Irlandia, was a Scottish theologian and diplomat.

== Life ==
A native of Scotland (Jean de Launoy, however, states that he was Irish), Ireland was first at St Andrews University but left in 1459 without a degree and joined the University of Paris as student and teacher. According to his own testimony he remained in France, "neare the tyme of thretty yere". Records of the Sorbonne suggest he came from a St Andrews family, although Perth has been suggested as his birthplace. Ireland settled in Paris, and became a doctor of the Sorbonne. As Johannes de Hirlandia he served as Rector of the University of Paris in 1469.

Louis XI of France sent Ireland to Scotland in 1480 to urge James III to declare war on England, and to reconcile Alexander Stewart, Duke of Albany with his brother the king (failing in this). King James induced him to return to live in Scotland, and gave him a benefice. Ireland then acted as his confessor, and wrote an advice book on kingship which was dedicated to his son and successor. His name appears on the rolls of the Scottish parliaments, and he is referred to by the Scottish historians John Lesley and Thomas Dempster.

As rector of Hawick, Ireland was one of the Scottish ambassadors sent in 1484 to France to receive the oath of Charles VIII to the treaty of 1483. On 23 September 1487 Henry VII of England, at the request of King James, granted a safe-conduct to the Bishop of St Andrews and John Irland, clerk.

== Works ==
Ireland wrote a book of advice for James III, who died during its compilation, and it was presented to his successor James IV. Divided into seven books, it comes from the Mirrors for princes genre. Book III is an exposition of the Apostles' Creed.

Ireland borrowed in it from the works of Jean Gerson, without acknowledgement; and it has also been argued that he used The Tale of Melibee by Geoffrey Chaucer as a source. The work references Troilus and Criseyde, and includes a religious lyric of Thomas Hoccleve, incorrectly attributed to Chaucer. Ireland was rector of Yarrow (de Foresta), when he completed this book at Edinburgh.

The book, preserved in manuscript in the Advocates Library, Edinburgh (MS. 18, 2, 8), and labelled Johannis de Irlandia opera theologica, is a treatise in Scots on the wisdom and discipline necessary to a prince. Usually called the Meroure of Wysdome it is the earliest extant example of original Scots prose. In the text, and in the title of the manuscript, it is noted that Ireland finished the work and gave it to the king in 1490.

Ireland also wrote a substantial Sentences commentary in four books; the last two books survive in manuscript, in Aberdeen University Library. In the Meroure John refers to two other vernacular writings, one of the "commandementis and uthir thingis pretenand to the salvacioune of man", the other, of the "tabill of confessioune". According to Thomas Dempster, Ireland also wrote Reconciliationis Modus ad Jacobum III Regem super dissidio cum Duce Albaniæ.
