= Gilbert Hay (poet) =

15th-century Scottish poet and translator

Gilbert Hay (b. c. 1403; last mentioned in 1456) or Sir Gilbert the Haye, Scottish poet and translator, was perhaps a kinsman of the house of Errol.

If he is the student named in the registers of the University of St Andrews in 1418-1419, his birth may be fixed about 1403. He lived in France for 24 years. He may have arrived in France in 1421 as part of the contingent led by John Stewart, Earl of Buchan. A "Gilbert de la Haye" is mentioned as present at Reims, in July 1430, at the coronation of Charles VII. He has left it on record, in the Prologue to his Buke of the Law of Armys, that he was "chaumerlayn umquhyle to the maist worthy King Charles of France." He may have left sometime in the mid-1440s, perhaps after the death of the dauphine Margaret Stewart in 1445. In 1456 he was back in Scotland, in the service of the chancellor, William Sinclair, 3rd Earl of Orkney and 1st Earl Caithness, "in his castell of Rosselyn," south of Edinburgh. The date of his death is unknown.

Hay is named by Dunbar in his Lament for the Makaris, and by Sir David Lyndsay in his Testament and Complaynt of the Papyngo. His only poetic work is The Buik of King Alexander the Conquerour, of which a portion, in copy, formerly at Taymouth Castle, now lies in the National Records of Scotland. Another copy, believed to be an earlier version, on which the Taymouth copy is based, can be found at the British Library. A more accessible version of both with a detailed textual analysis of the differences was published by the Scottish Text Society in 1986.

He has left three translations, extant in one volume (in old binding) in the collection of Abbotsford:

1. The Buke of the Law of Armys or the Buke of Bataillis, a translation of Honoré Bonet's Arbre des batailles
2. The Buke of the Order of Knichthood from the Livre de l'ordre de chevalerie (Llibre qui es de l'ordre de cavalleria) of Ramon Llull
3. The Buke of the Governaunce of Princes, from a French version of the pseudo-Aristotelian Secreta secretorum

The second of these precedes Caxton's independent translation by at least ten years.

An early commentary and edited version of the Taymouth Castle MS of the Bulk of Alexander was written by Albert Herrmann as The Taymouth Castle Manuscript of Sir Gilbert Hay's Buik, &c., (Berlin, 1898). The complete Abbotsford Manuscript has been reprinted by the Scottish Text Society (ed. JH Stevenson). The first volume, containing The Buke of the Law of Armys, appeared in 1901. The Order of Knichthood was printed by David Laing for the Abbotsford Club (1847). See also STS edition "Introduction" and Gregory Smith's Specimens of Middle Scots, in which annotated extracts are given from the Abbotsford Manuscript, the oldest known example of literary Scots prose.

== Works ==
- Albert Herrmann: The Taymouth castle manuscript of Sir Gilbert Hays "Buik of King Alexander the Conquerour". 1898 digital
- Albert Herrmann: The Forraye of Gadderis. The Vowis : extracts from Sir Gilbert Hay's "Buik of King Alexander the Conquerour". 1900 digital
