= Jean Max Tixier =

French poet (1935–2009)

- Born: 1935; Marseille, France
- Died: 30 September 2009 (aged 73–74)
- Occupation: Poet
- Writing career
- Notable awards: Prix Mallarmé (2009)

Jean Max Tixier (1935 in Marseille – 30 September 2009) was a French poet.

== Life ==
Jean Max Tixier studied at the collège Victor-Hugo, before attending the lycée Thiers of Marseille.

He taught at the Lycée Agricole de Hyères. Alongside his teaching career, which he began in 1962, Jean-Max Tixier pursued a prolific journalistic and literary activity.

He was Correspondent Member of the European Art Center (EUARCE) of Greece (2004)

He was a member of the Editorial Board of journals "Autre Sud" (after the journal "Sud" 1970-1996), "Encres Vives", and "Poésie 1 Vagabondages".

== Awards ==
- 1992 Campion-Guillaumet Prize by SGDL, for Etats du lieu
- 1994 Provence Grand Prize of Literature
- 1995 Antonin Artaud Prize, for L’oiseau de glaise
- 2009 Mallarmé prize

== Bibliography ==
- Chants de l'évidence Autres Temps (2009) ISBN 978-2-84521-338-8
- Le grenier à sel Encres vives (2008)
- Les silences du passeur Le Taillis pré (2006)
- Le temps des mots Pluie d'étoiles éditions (2004)

=== English translations ===
- "Praise for the Ferryman"; "Writings"; "Three Fables Without a Moral", The Chariton Review, Vol. 31, No. 2

=== Collections and chapbooks ===
1. Passage, avec Youl, tirage limité à 3 exemplaires, 2005
2. Stances à la demme dernière, éd. Alain Benoît, 2005
3. Fragments de l'obscur/Frammenti dal buio, bilingual édition
4. Campanotto Editore, Passian di Prato, 2004
5. Le Temps des mots, éd. Pluie d'étoiles, 2004
6. Requiem pour un silence, éd. La Porte, 2003
7. Profils de chutes et autres partitions, éd. Telo Martius, 2003
8. Le manteau de circé, ed Le Taillis Pré, 2003
9. Jardin ou peut-être jardin, Alain Benoît, 2003
10. Double marée, collection Pli dirigée par Daniel Leuwers, 2002
11. Fragments de l'obscur, éd. Associatives Clapas, 2002
12. Chasseur de mémoire, Le Cherche-mid, 2001 ISBN 978-2-86274-808-5
13. Aphrorismes du silence, collection Le Livre d'argile, 2001
14. Le Temps des guêpes, éd. Tipaza, 2000
15. Où s'invente le jour, éd. Associatives Clapas, 2000
16. L'imprécation du silence, éd. Cogito, 1999
17. Recitativ de Sare, traduit du roumain, éd. Libra, 1999
18. Petites histoires de la mer, éd. Pluie d'étoiles, 1999
19. Scènes des songes quotidiens, éd. Associatives Clapas, 1998
20. Questions de climat, éd. Autres Temps, 1997
21. L’oiseau de glaise, Arcantère, 1995. ISBN 978-2-86829-063-2
22. L’instant précaire, L’arbre à paroles, 1995
23. Le Roseau Noir, éd. L'Atelier des Grames, 1994
24. Espace d'un jardin, éd. Associatives Clapas, 1993
25. Etats du lieu, Autres Temps, 1992.
26. Vertige Camaieu, éd. Telo Martieus, 1991
27. L’arrière-temps, La Table rase, le Noroît, 1989
28. Silence ombre portée, éd. Encres vives, 1987
29. La Traversée des eaux, Sud, 1984
30. Etats des lieux, Ed Sud, 1984
31. Demeure sous les eaux, éd. L'Atelier des Grames, 1983
32. Ouverture du delta, éd. Encres vives, 1980
33. Lecture d’une ville, Sud, 1976
34. Design, éd. Encres vives, 1973
35. Mesure de la soif, éd. Encres vives, 1970
36. En guise de paroles, éd. Encres vives, 1970
37. La pierre hypnotisée, éd. Les Nouveaux Cahiers de "Jeunesse", 1968
38. La vague immédiate, éd. Mic Berthe, 1967
39. La pousse des choses, éd. Encres vives, 1967

=== Young Adult ===
1. Petites histoires de la mer, Pluie d’étoiles, 1999

=== Novels ===
1. Notes de San Michele et autres textes. gehess agence editoriale. 2008. ISBN 978-2-35464-033-0.
2. L'Homme chargé d'octobres, le Cherche-midi, 2005 ISBN 978-2-7491-0422-5
3. La fiancée du santonnier, Les Presses de la cité, 2002
4. Le crime des Hautes Terres, Les Presses de la Cité, 2001
5. Le jardin d’argile, le Cherche-midi, 1997 ISBN 978-2-86274-514-5

=== Anthologies ===
1. La Poésie française contemporaine, éd. Cogito, 2004
2. Joyaux au sud / Juvaere din sud, traduit du roumain, éd. Cogito, 2004
3. Poètes de sud, éd. Rijois, 1978

=== Essays ===
- Vers une logoqie poétique, éd. La Table Rase, 1980
