= Jean Tixier de Ravisi =

- Born: c. 1470; Ravisi, Nivernais, France
- Died: 3 December 1542
- Resting place: Chapel cemetery College of Navarre
- Other names: Johannes Textor Ravisius, Nivernensis
- Education: College of Navarre
- Scientific career
- Workplaces: College of Navarre

Jean Tixier de Ravisi (c. 1470–1542) was a French Renaissance humanist scholar and professor of rhetoric. He was born in Ravisi, which is near the commune of Saint-Saulge in the central province of Nivernais. His works, which are mostly on the topic of education, were widely accepted and employed by French academia. Tixier eventually adopted the Latinised name Johannes Textor Ravisius, Nivernensis.

Per the epitaph on his headstone, Tixier was born in 1470, and died on 3 December 1542. According to Victor Gueneau, other scholars pretend that he died on 13 December 1524, and that his brother, Jacques, completed Jean's book l'Origine de l'imprimerie ("The Origin of Printing"). Similarly, some authors report his year of birth to be approximately 1480.

Tixier studied humanities at the College of Navarre. When he graduated, he accepted a position in the college's rhetoric department; there he impressed faculty and students alike. In 1520, he accepted a position as rector of the University of Paris. He held the position until 1525, succeeded by William Manderstown.

More than thirty editions of his principal work, Officina, were published as he continued to expand it. His other writings were published posthumously.

== See also ==
- List of rectors of the University of Paris
