= History of the Irish language =

The history of the Irish language begins with the period from the arrival of speakers of Celtic languages in Ireland to Ireland's earliest known form of Irish, Primitive Irish, which is found in Ogham inscriptions dating from the 3rd or 4th century AD. After the conversion to Christianity in the 5th century, Old Irish begins to appear as glosses and other marginalia in manuscripts written in Latin, beginning in the 6th century. It evolved in the 10th century to Middle Irish. Early Modern Irish represented a transition between Middle and Modern Irish. Its literary form, Classical Gaelic, was used by writers in both Ireland and Scotland until the 18th century, in the course of which slowly but surely writers began writing in the vernacular dialects, Ulster Irish, Connacht Irish, Munster Irish and Scottish Gaelic. As the number of hereditary poets and scribes dwindled under British rule in the early 19th century, Irish became a mostly spoken tongue with little written literature appearing in the language until the Gaelic Revival of the late 19th century. The number of speakers was also declining in this period with monoglot and bilingual speakers of Irish increasingly adopting only English: while Irish never died out, by the time of the Revival it was largely confined to the less Anglicised regions of the island, which were often also the more rural and remote areas. In the 20th and 21st centuries, Irish has continued to survive in Gaeltacht regions and among a minority in other regions. It has once again come to be considered an important part of the island's culture and heritage, with efforts being made to preserve and promote it.

== Early history ==
Indo-European languages may have arrived in Ireland between 2400 and 2000 BC with the spread of the Bell Beaker culture when around 90% of the contemporary Neolithic population was replaced by lineages related to the Yamnaya culture from the Pontic steppe. The Beaker culture has been suggested as a candidate for an early Indo-European culture, specifically, as ancestral to proto-Celtic. J. P. Mallory proposed in 2013 that the Beaker culture was associated with a European branch of Indo-European dialects, termed "North-west Indo-European", ancestral to not only Celtic but also Italic, Germanic, and Balto-Slavic.

== Primitive Irish ==
The earliest written form of the Irish language is known to linguists as Primitive Irish. Primitive Irish is known only from fragments, mostly personal names, inscribed on stone in the Ogham alphabet. The earliest of such inscriptions probably date from the 3rd or 4th century. Ogham inscriptions are found primarily in the south of Ireland as well as in Wales, Devon and Cornwall, where it was brought by settlers from Ireland to sub-Roman Britain, and in the Isle of Man.

== Old Irish ==
Old Irish was the first written vernacular language north of the Alps, and it first appeared in the margins of Latin manuscripts as early as the 6th century. Old Irish can be divided into two periods: Early Old Irish, also called Archaic Irish (c. 7th century), and Old Irish (8th–9th century). One of the most notable Old Irish texts was the Senchas Már, a series of early legal tracts that are alleged to "have been redacted from a pre-Christian original by Saint Patrick."

Stories of the Ulster Cycle were written primarily in the Middle Irish period, but many of the heroes featured were initially described in Old Irish texts. Many early Irish literary texts, though recorded in manuscripts of the Middle Irish period (such as Lebor na hUidre and the Book of Leinster), are essentially Old Irish in character.

== Middle Irish ==
Middle Irish is the form of Irish used from c. 900 to c. 1200; it is therefore a contemporary of late Old English and early Middle English. It is characterized by an increased amount of linguistic variation compared to the relatively uniform writing of Old Irish. In Middle Irish texts. writers blended together contemporary and older linguistic forms in the same text.

Middle Irish is the language of a large amount of literature, including the entire Ulster Cycle.

== Early Modern Irish ==
Early Modern Irish (c. 1200–1600) represents a transition between Middle Irish and Modern Irish. Its literary form, Classical Gaelic, was used in Ireland and Scotland from the 13th to the 18th century. The grammar of Early Modern Irish is laid out in a series of grammatical tracts written by native speakers and intended to teach the most cultivated form of the language to student bards, lawyers, doctors, administrators, monks, and so on in Ireland and Scotland.

== Nineteenth and twentieth centuries ==
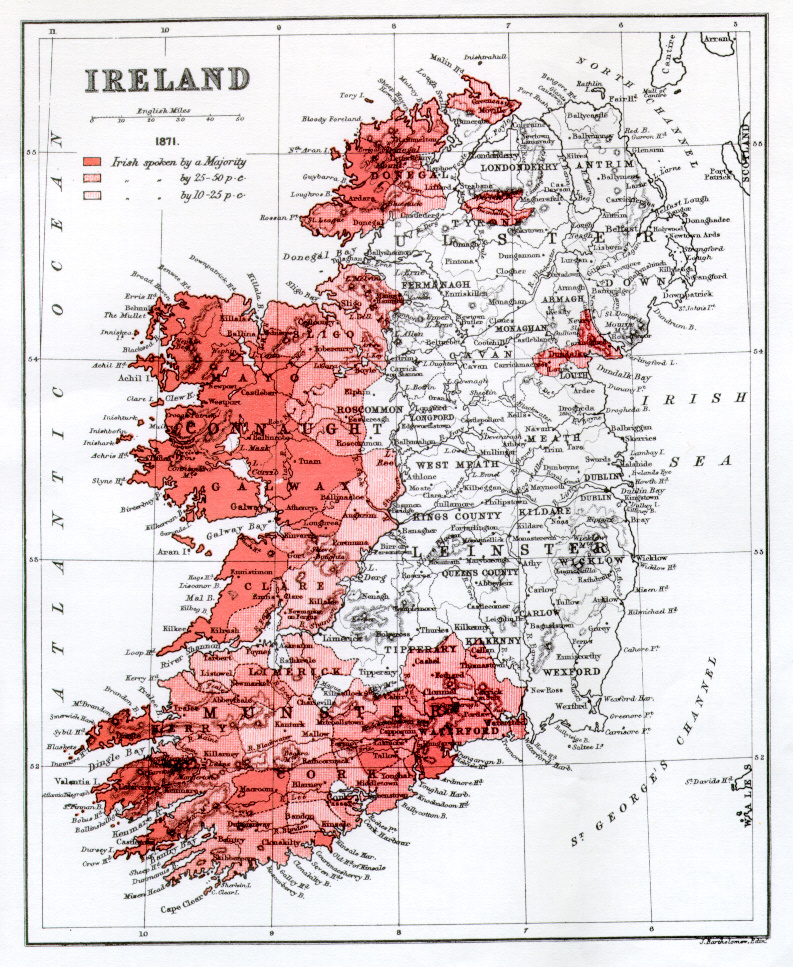
The distribution of the Irish language in 1871.

It is believed that Irish remained the majority tongue as late as 1800 but became a minority language during the 19th century. It is an important part of Irish nationalist identity, marking a cultural distance between Irish people and the English.

A combination of the introduction of state funded, though predominantly denominationally Church delivered, primary education (the National Schools), from 1831, in which Irish was omitted from the curriculum till 1878, and only then added as a curiosity, to be learnt after English, Latin, Greek and French, and in the absence of an authorised Irish Catholic bible (An Biobla Naofa) before 1981, resulting in instruction primarily in English, or Latin. The National Schools run by the Catholic Church discouraged its use until about 1890.

The Great Famine (An Drochshaol) hit a disproportionately high number of Irish speakers (who lived in the poorer areas heavily hit by famine deaths and emigration), translated into its rapid decline.

Irish political leaders, such as Daniel O'Connell (Domhnall Ó Conaill, himself a native speaker), were also critical of the language, seeing it as "backward", with English the language of the future.

Economic opportunities for most Irish people arose with the Second Industrial Revolution in the English-speaking British Empire and United States. Contemporary reports spoke of Irish-speaking parents actively discouraging their children from speaking the language, and encouraging the use of English instead. This stigma towards speaking Irish remained strong long after independence.

It has been argued, however, that the sheer number of Irish speakers in the nineteenth century and their social diversity meant that both religious and secular authorities had to engage with them. This meant that Irish, rather than being marginalised, was an essential element in the modernization of Ireland, especially before the Great Famine of the 1840s. Irish speakers insisted on using the language in the law courts (even when they knew English), and it was common to employ interpreters. It was not unusual for magistrates, lawyers and jurors to employ their own knowledge of Irish. Fluency in Irish was often necessary in commercial matters. Political candidates and political leaders found the language invaluable. Irish was an integral part of the "devotional revolution" which marked the standardisation of Catholic religious practice, and the Catholic bishops (often partly blamed for the decline of the language) went to great lengths to ensure there was an adequate supply of Irish-speaking priests. Irish was widely and unofficially used as a language of instruction both in the local pay-schools (often called hedge schools) and in the National Schools. Even after the 1840s, Irish speakers could be found in all occupations and professions.

The initial moves to reverse the decline of the language were championed by Anglo-Irish Protestants such as the linguist and clergyman William Neilson, towards the end of the 18th century, and Samuel Ferguson; the major push occurred with the foundation by Douglas Hyde, the son of a Church of Ireland rector, of the Gaelic League (Conradh na Gaeilge) in 1893, which was a factor in launching the Irish Revival movement. The Gaelic league managed to reach 50,000 members by 1904 and also successfully pressured the government into allowing the Irish language as a language of instruction the same year. Leading supporters of Conradh included Pádraig Pearse and Éamon de Valera. The revival of interest in the language coincided with other cultural revivals, such as the foundation of the Gaelic Athletic Association and the growth in the performance of plays about Ireland in English, by playwrights including W. B. Yeats, J. M. Synge, Seán O'Casey and Lady Gregory, with their launch of the Abbey Theatre. By 1901, only approximately 641,000 people spoke Irish with only just 20,953 of those speakers being monolingual Irish speakers; how many had emigrated is unknown, but it is probably safe to say that a larger number of speakers lived elsewhere This change in demographics can be attributed to the Great Famine as well as the increasing social pressure to speak English.

Even though the Abbey Theatre playwrights wrote in English (and indeed some disliked Irish) the Irish language affected them, as it did all Irish English speakers. The version of English spoken in Ireland, known as Hiberno-English bears similarities in some grammatical idioms with Irish. Writers who have used Hiberno-English include J. M. Synge, Yeats, George Bernard Shaw, Oscar Wilde and more recently in the writings of Seamus Heaney, Paul Durcan, and Dermot Bolger.

This national cultural revival of the late 19th century and early 20th century matched the growing Irish radicalism in Irish politics. Many of those, such as Pearse, de Valera, W. T. Cosgrave (Liam Mac Cosguir) and Ernest Blythe (Earnán de Blaghd), who fought to achieve Irish independence and came to govern the independent Irish Free State, first became politically aware through Conradh na Gaeilge. Douglas Hyde had mentioned the necessity of "de-anglicizing" Ireland, as a cultural goal that was not overtly political. Hyde resigned from its presidency in 1915 in protest when the movement voted to affiliate with the separatist cause; it had been infiltrated by members of the secretive Irish Republican Brotherhood, and had changed from being a purely cultural group to one with radical nationalist aims.

A Church of Ireland campaign to promote worship and religion in Irish was started in 1914 with the founding of Cumann Gaelach na hEaglaise (the Irish Guild of the Church). The Catholic Church also replaced its liturgies in Latin with Irish and English following the Second Vatican Council in the 1960s, and its first Bible was published in 1981. The hit song "Theme from Harry's Game" by County Donegal music group Clannad, became the first song to appear on Britain's Top of the Pops with Irish lyrics in 1982.

It has been estimated that there were around 800,000 monoglot Irish speakers in 1800, which dropped to 320,000 by the end of the famine, and under 17,000 by 1911.

== Twenty-first century ==
Proportion of respondents who said they could speak Irish, 2011

In July 2003, the Official Languages Act was signed, declaring Irish an official language, requiring public service providers to make services available in the language, which affected advertising, signage, announcements, public reports, and more.

In 2007, Irish became an official working language of the European Union.

== Independent Ireland and the language ==
The independent Irish state was established in 1922 (Irish Free State 1922–1937; Ireland (Éire) from 1937, also described since 1949 as the Republic of Ireland). Although some Republican leaders had been committed language enthusiasts, the new state continued to use English as the language of administration, even in areas where over 80% of the population spoke Irish. There was some initial enthusiasm – a Dáil decree of March 1922 required that the Irish versions of names on all birth, death and marriage certificates would have to be used from July 1923. While the decree was passed unanimously, it was never implemented, probably because of the outbreak of the Irish Civil War. Those areas of the state where Irish had remained widespread were officially designated as Gaeltachtaí, where the language would initially be preserved and then ideally be expanded from across the whole island.

The government refused to implement the 1926 recommendations of the Gaeltacht Commission, which included restoring Irish as the language of administration in such areas. As the role of the state grew, it therefore exerted tremendous pressure on Irish speakers to use English. This was only partly offset by measures which were supposed to support the Irish language. For instance, the state was by far the largest employer. A qualification in Irish was required to apply for state jobs. However, this did not require a high level of fluency, and few public employees were ever required to use Irish in the course of their work. On the other hand, state employees had to have perfect command of English and had to use it constantly. Because most public employees had a poor command of Irish, it was impossible to deal with them in Irish. If an Irish speaker wanted to apply for a grant, obtain electricity, or complain about being over-taxed, they would typically have had to do so in English. As late as 1986, a Bord na Gaeilge report noted "...the administrative agencies of the state have been among the strongest forces for Anglicisation in Gaeltacht areas".

The new state also attempted to promote Irish through the school system. Some politicians claimed that the state would become predominantly Irish-speaking within a generation. In 1928, Irish was made a compulsory subject for the Intermediate Certificate exams, and for the Leaving Certificate in 1934. However, it is generally agreed that the compulsory policy was clumsily implemented. The principal ideologue was Professor Timothy Corcoran of University College Dublin, who "did not trouble to acquire the language himself". From the mid-1940s onward the policy of teaching all subjects to English-speaking children through Irish was abandoned. In the following decades, support for the language was progressively reduced. Irish has undergone spelling and script reforms since the 1940s to simplify the language. The orthographic system was changed and the traditional Irish script fell into disuse. These reforms were met with a negative reaction and many people argued that these changes marked a loss of the Irish identity in order to appease language learners. Another reason for this backlash was that the reforms forced the current Irish speakers to relearn how to read Irish in order to adapt to the new system.

It is disputed to what extent such professed language revivalists as de Valera genuinely tried to Gaelicise political life. Even in the first Dáil Éireann, few speeches were delivered in Irish, with the exception of formal proceedings. In the 1950s, An Caighdeán Oifigiúil ("The Official Standard") was introduced to simplify spellings and allow easier communication by different dialect speakers. By 1965 speakers in the Dáil regretted that those taught Irish in the traditional Irish script (the Cló Gaedhealach) over the previous decades were not helped by the recent change to the Latin script, the Cló Romhánach. An ad-hoc "Language Freedom Movement" that was opposed to the compulsory teaching of Irish was started in 1966, but it had largely faded away within a decade.

Overall, the percentage of people speaking Irish as a first language has decreased since independence, while the number of second-language speakers has increased.

There have been some modern success stories in language preservation and promotion such as Gaelscoileanna the education movement, Official Languages Act 2003, TG4, RTÉ Raidió na Gaeltachta and Foinse.

In 2005, Enda Kenny, formerly an Irish teacher, called for compulsory Irish to end at the Junior Certificate level, and for the language to be an optional subject for Leaving Certificate students. This provoked considerable comment, and Taoiseach Bertie Ahern argued that it should remain compulsory.

Today, estimates of fully native speakers range from 40,000 to 80,000 people. In the republic, there are just over 72,000 people who use Irish as a daily language outside education, as well as a larger minority of the population who are fluent but do not use it on a daily basis. (While census figures indicate that 1.66 million people in the republic have some knowledge of the language, a significant percentage of these know only a little.) Smaller numbers of Irish speakers exist in Britain, Canada (particularly in Newfoundland), the United States of America and other countries.

The most significant development in recent decades has been a rise in the number of urban Irish speakers. This community, which has been described as well-educated and largely middle-class, is largely based on an independent school system (called gaelscoileanna at primary level) which teaches entirely through Irish. These schools perform exceptionally well academically. An analysis of "feeder" schools (which supply students to tertiary level institutions) has shown that 22% of the Irish-medium schools sent all their students on to tertiary level, compared to 7% of English-medium schools. Given the rapid decline in the number of traditional speakers in the Gaeltacht it seems likely that the future of the language is in urban areas. It has been suggested that fluency in Irish, with its social and occupational advantages, may now be the mark of an urban elite. Others have argued, on the contrary, that the advantage lies with a middle-class elite which is, for cultural reasons, simply more likely to speak Irish. It has been estimated that the active Irish-language scene (mostly urban) may comprise as much as 10 per cent of Ireland's population.

== Northern Ireland and the language ==
Since the partition of Ireland, the language communities in the Republic and Northern Ireland have taken radically different trajectories. While Irish is officially the first language of the Republic, in Northern Ireland the language only gained official status a century after partition with the Identity and Language (Northern Ireland) Act 2022. Irish in Northern Ireland declined rapidly during the 20th centuries, with its traditional Irish speaking-communities being replaced by learners and Gaelscoileanna. A recent development has been the interest shown by some Protestants in East Belfast who found out Irish was not an exclusively Catholic language and had been spoken by Protestants, mainly Presbyterians, in Ulster. In the 19th century fluency in Irish was at times a prerequisite to become a Presbyterian minister.
