= Early Modern Irish =

Earlier form of the Irish language

- Early Modern Gaelic
- Gaoidhealg
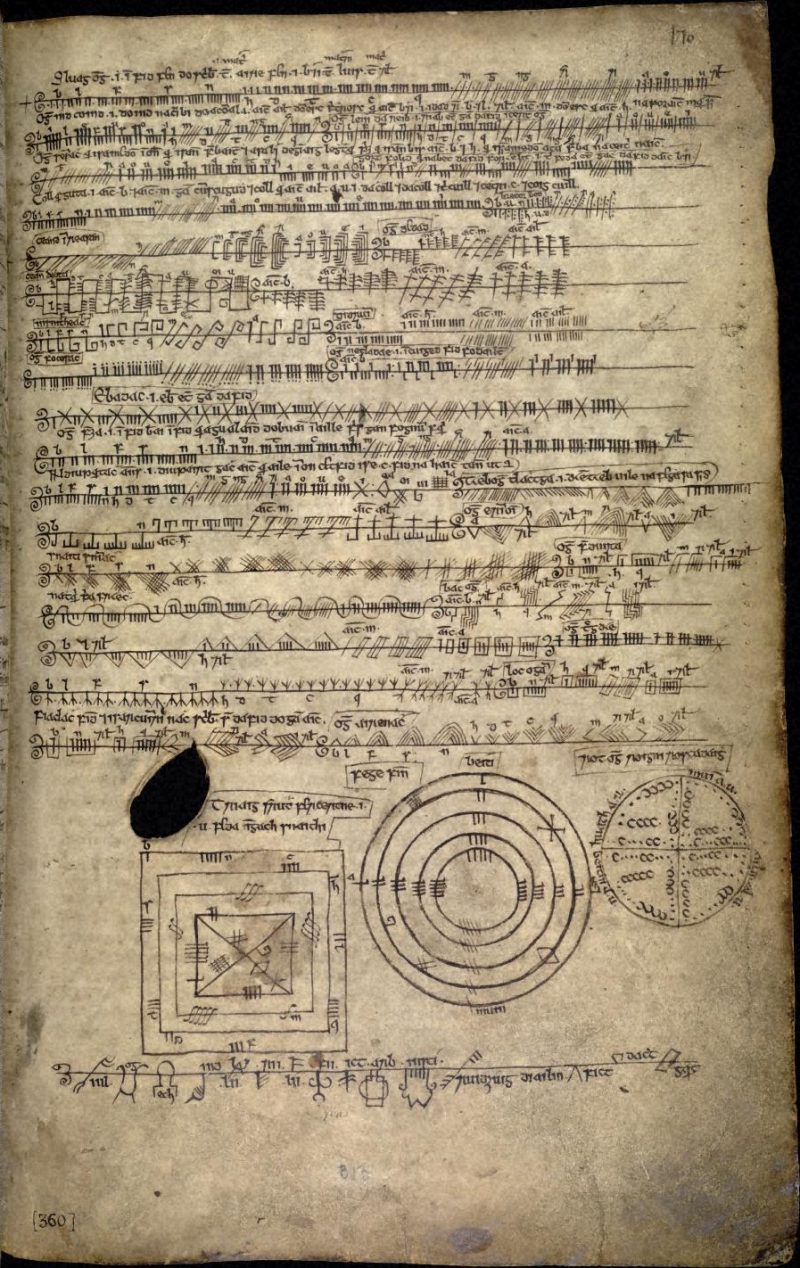
- fol. 170r of the Book of Ballymote (1390), the Auraicept na n-Éces explaining the Ogham script.
- Native to: Scotland, Ireland
- Era: c. 1200 to c. 1600
- Language family: Indo-European: Celtic; Insular Celtic; Goidelic; Early Modern Irish
- Early forms: Primitive Irish: Old Irish; Middle Irish
- Standard forms: Classical Gaelic
- Writing system: Latin

Language codes
- ISO 639-3: ghc
- Glottolog: hibe1235

Early Modern Irish (Irish: Gaeilge Chlasaiceach, lit. 'Classical Irish') was a transitional language between Middle Irish and Modern Irish. Its literary form, Classical Gaelic, was used in Ireland and Scotland from the 13th to the 18th century.

== Classical Gaelic ==
Classical Gaelic or Classical Irish (Gaoidhealg) was a shared literary form of Gaelic that was in use by poets in Scotland and Ireland from the 13th century to the 18th century.

Although the first written signs of Scottish Gaelic having diverged from Irish appear as far back as the annotations, dated to the early 12th century, in the Book of Deer, Scottish Gaelic did not have a separate standardised form and did not appear in print on a significant scale until the 1767 translation of the New Testament into Scottish Gaelic; however, in the 16th century, John Carswell's Foirm na n-Urrnuidheadh, an adaptation of John Knox's Book of Common Order, was the first book printed in either Scottish or Irish Gaelic.

Before that time, the vernacular dialects of Ireland and Scotland were considered to belong to a single language, and in the late 12th century a highly formalized standard variant of that language was created for the use in bardic poetry. The standard was created by medieval Gaelic poets based on the vernacular usage of the late 12th century and allowed a lot of dialectal forms that existed at that point in time, but was kept conservative and had been taught virtually unchanged throughout later centuries. The grammar and metrical rules were described in a series of grammatical tracts and linguistic poems used for teaching in bardic schools.

=== External history ===
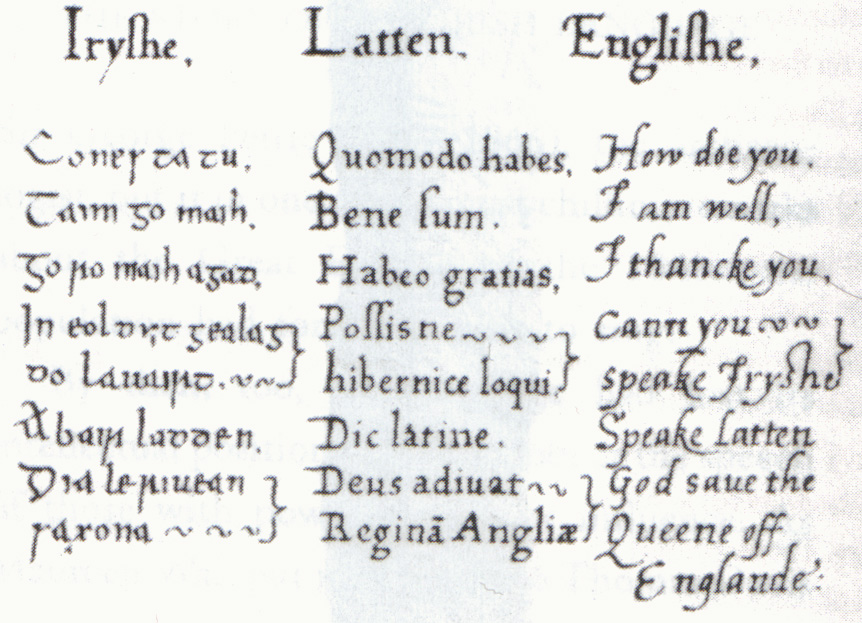
Multilingual phrasebook compiled for Elizabeth I of England.

The Tudor dynasty sought to subdue its Irish citizens. The Tudor rulers attempted to do this by restricting the use of the Irish language while simultaneously promoting the use of the English language. English expansion in Ireland, outside of the Pale, was attempted under Mary I, but ended with poor results. Queen Elizabeth I was proficient in several languages and is reported to have expressed a desire to understand Irish. A primer was prepared on her behalf by Christopher Nugent, 6th Baron Delvin.

== Phonology ==
=== Consonants ===
At the beginning of the 13th century, Classical Gaelic consonants were identical to Old and Middle Irish. Ó Maolalaigh lists the changes that affected all dialects over the next 500 years:

- Loss of all dental fricatives: [θ(ʲ), ð(ʲ)] > [h, ɣ(ʲ)]
- Depalatalisation of rʲ
- Denasalisation of ṽ and ṽʲ
- Loss of voiced dental stops after nasals

		Labial	Dental	Alveolar	Velar	Glottal
Nasal	broad	m	N n		ŋ	
Nasal	slender	mʲ	Nʲ nʲ		ŋʲ	
Plosive	broad	p b	t d		k ɡ	
Plosive	slender	pʲ bʲ	tʲ dʲ		kʲ ɡʲ	
Fricative	broad	f v	(θ ð)	s	x ɣ	h
Fricative	slender	fʲ vʲ	(θʲ ðʲ)	sʲ	xʲ ɣʲ	hʲ
Nasalized fricative	broad	ṽ				
Nasalized fricative	slender	ṽʲ				
Approximant	broad		R r			
Approximant	slender		(Rʲ) rʲ			
Lateral	broad		L l			
Lateral	slender		Lʲ lʲ			

=== Vowels ===
At the beginning of the 13th century, Irish possessed the following vowels and diphthongsː

	Front	Central	Back
Diphthong	iaː iaː		ua uaː
Close	i iː		u uː
Mid	e eː	(ə) əː	o oː
Open	a aː		

== Orthography ==
=== Consonants ===
By the 16th century, Irish scribes used two different methods to indicate lenition: the dot (Irish: ponc séimhithe), or h-diagraphs. These respective methods became standardised, with Insular script using the ponc, and Antiqua (introduced by the English at the beginning of the 1600s) using Ch.

Broad consonant phonemes
Letter	Word-initial			Non-initial	
Letter	unmutated	eclipsed	lenited	single	geminate
b	/b/	⟨mb⟩ /m/	⟨ḃ/bh⟩ /v/		⟨bb⟩ /b/
c	/k/	/ɡ/	⟨ċ/ch⟩ /x/	/k/, /ɡ/	⟨cc⟩ /k/
d	/d/	⟨nd⟩ /N/	⟨ḋ/dh⟩ /ð/		—
f	/f/	/v/	⟨ḟ/fh⟩ / /	/f/	—
g	/ɡ/	⟨ng⟩ /ŋ/	⟨ġ/gh⟩ /ɣ/		—
h	See explanation below				
l	/L/	—	/l/		⟨ll⟩ /L/
m	/m/	—	⟨ṁ/mh⟩ /ṽ/		⟨mm⟩ /m/
n	/N/	—	/n/		⟨nn⟩ /N/
p	/p/	/b/	⟨ṗ/ph⟩ /f/	/p/, /b/	⟨pp⟩ /p/
r	/R/	—	/r/		⟨rr⟩ /R/
s	/s/	—	⟨ṡ/sh⟩ /h/	/s/	—
t	/t/	/d/	⟨ṫ/th⟩ /θ/	/t/, /d/	⟨tt⟩ /t/

=== Vowels ===
Irish orthography had undergone changes, including in vowels, reflecting phonetic shift during the Middle Irish period, which were completed by 1200. It remained conservative from the Middle Ages until 1958, when the Irish government instituted the reformed Caighdeán Oifigiúil.

Vowels
Letter	Short	Long
a	/a/, /ə/ (Note: Unstressed.)	⟨á⟩ /aː/
e	/ʲe/, /ʲə/ (Note: Unstressed.)	⟨é⟩ /ʲeː/
i	/ʲi/	⟨í⟩ /ʲiː/
o	/o/	⟨ó⟩ /oː/
u	/u/	⟨ú⟩ /uː/
ao	—	/əː/
ia	/ia/	⟨iá⟩ /iaː/
ua	/ia/	⟨uá⟩ /uaː/

In addition to the above diphthongs, vowel digraphs could also represent early Middle Irish off-glides, which became the primary syllable nuclei by the end of that era.

Off-glides (Simplified)
Letter 1	Letter 2	IPA (MGA)	IPA (GHC)
a, o, u	i	[a o u]ⁱ	i
á, ó, ú	i	[a o u]ːⁱ	iː
e, i	a, (Note: ea only.) o, u	[e i][ᵃ ᵒ ᵘ]	ʲ[a o u]
é, í	a, á, (Note: éa or eá only.) o, u	[e i]ː[ᵃ ᵒ ᵘ]	ʲ[a o u]ː

== Grammar ==
The grammar of Early Modern Irish is laid out in a series of grammatical tracts written by native speakers and intended to teach the most cultivated form of the language to student bards, lawyers, doctors, administrators, monks, and so on in Ireland and Scotland. The tracts were edited and published by Osborn Bergin as a supplement to Ériu between 1916 and 1955 under the title Irish Grammatical Tracts. and some with commentary and translation by Lambert McKenna in 1944 as Bardic Syntactical Tracts.

The neuter gender is gone (formerly neuter nouns transition mostly to masculine, occasionally feminine categories) – but some historically neuter nouns may still optionally cause eclipsis of a following complement (e.g. lá n-aon "one day"), as they did in Old Irish. The distinction between preposition + accusative to show motion toward a goal (e.g. san gcath "into the battle") and preposition + dative to show non–goal-oriented location (e.g. san chath "in the battle") is lost during this period in the spoken language, as is the distinction between nominative and accusative case in nouns, but they are kept in Classical Gaelic. The Classical Gaelic standard also requires the use of accusative for direct object of the verb if it is different in form from the nominative.

Verb endings are also in transition. The ending -ann (which spread from conjunct forms of Old Irish n-stem verbs like benaid, ·ben "(he) hits, strikes"), today the usual 3rd person ending in the present tense, was originally just an alternative ending found only in verbs in dependent position, i.e. after particles such as the negative, but it started to appear in independent forms in 15th century prose and was common by 17th century. Thus Classical Gaelic originally had molaidh "[he] praises" versus ní mhol or ní mholann "[he] does not praise", whereas later Early Modern and Modern Irish have molann sé and ní mholann sé. This innovation was not followed in Scottish Gaelic, where the ending -ann has never spread, but the present and future tenses were merged: glacaidh e "he will grasp" but cha ghlac e "he will not grasp".

The fully stressed personal pronouns (which developed during Middle Irish out of Old Irish pronouns that were reserved for copular predicatives) are allowed in object and optionally in subject positions. If the subject is a 1st or 2nd person pronoun stated explicitly, the 3rd person form of the verb is used – most verb forms can take either the synthetic or analytic form, for example "I will speak" can be expressed as laibheórad (1st sg. form) or laibheóraidh mé (3rd sg. form and 1st sg. pronoun mé). The singular form is also used with 1st and 2nd person plural pronouns (laibheóraidh sinn "we will speak", laibheóraidh sibh "ye will speak") but the 3rd person plural form is used whenever a 3rd person plural subject is expressed (laibheóraid na fir "the men will speak").

With regards to the pronouns Classical Gaelic (as well as Middle Irish) shows signs of split ergativity – the pronouns are divided into two sets with partial ergative-absolutive alignment. The forms used for direct object of transitive verbs (the "object" pronouns) are also used:

1. as subjects of passive verbs, e.g. cuirthear ar an mbord é "it is put onto the table" – in Modern Irish these are understood as active autonomous verbs instead,
2. for subjects of the copula, e.g. mo theanga, is é m'arm-sa í "my tongue, it is my weapon" (feminine í "it, she" refers back to mo theanga) – this is continued in Modern Irish,
3. and they might be optionally used as subjects of intransitive verbs (instead of the "subject" pronouns) – this usage seems to indicate lack of agency or will in the subject, e.g. do bhí an baile gan bheannach / go raibhe í ag Éireannach "the settlement was without a blessing until it was in the hands of an Irishman".

The 3rd usage above disappeared in Modern Irish and even in Classical Gaelic the unmarked and more common pattern is to use the "subject" pronouns like with transitive verbs.

The 3rd person subject pronouns are always optional and often dropped in poetry. The infix pronouns inherited from Old Irish are still optionally used in poetry for direct objects, but their use was likely outdated in speech already in the beginning of the Early Modern period.

== Literature ==
The first book printed in any Goidelic language was published in 1567 in Edinburgh, a translation of John Knox's 'Liturgy' by Séon Carsuel, Bishop of the Isles. He used a slightly modified form of the Classical Gaelic and also used the Roman script. In 1571, the first book in Irish to be printed in Ireland was a Protestant 'catechism', containing a guide to spelling and sounds in Irish. It was written by John Kearney, treasurer of St. Patrick's Cathedral. The type used was adapted to what has become known as the Irish script. This was published in 1602-3 by the printer Francke. The Church of Ireland (a member of the Anglican communion) undertook the first publication of Scripture in Irish. The first Irish translation of the New Testament was begun by Nicholas Walsh, Bishop of Ossory, who worked on it until his murder in 1585. The work was continued by John Kearny, his assistant, and Dr. Nehemiah Donellan, Archbishop of Tuam, and it was finally completed by William Daniel (Uilliam Ó Domhnaill), Archbishop of Tuam in succession to Donellan. Their work was printed in 1602. The work of translating the Old Testament was undertaken by William Bedel (1571–1642), Bishop of Kilmore, who completed his translation within the reign of Charles the First, however it was not published until 1680, in a revised version by Narcissus Marsh (1638–1713), Archbishop of Dublin. William Bedell had undertaken a translation of the Book of Common Prayer in 1606. An Irish translation of the revised prayer book of 1662 was effected by John Richardson (1664–1747) and published in 1712.

== Encoding ==
ISO 639-3 gives the name "Hiberno-Scottish Gaelic" (and the code ghc) to cover Classical Gaelic. The code was introduced in the 15th edition of Ethnologue, with the language being described as "[a]rchaic literary language based on 12th century Irish, formerly used by professional classes in Ireland until the 17th century and Scotland until the 18th century."

== See also ==
- History of the Irish language
- Scottish Gaelic
