= Gaelic literature =

Gaelic literature (Irish: Litríocht na Gaeilge; Scottish Gaelic: Litreachas na Gàidhlig) is literature in the vernacular Gaelic languages of Ireland, Scotland and the Isle of Man.

Irish literature is recognised as the third oldest literature tradition of Europe, behind only Latin literature and Greek literature: literature has been written in Gaelic languages from the 1st centuries AD to the present day. Latin had been used extensively in the Gaelic lands, with the advent of Christianity, however, the Gaels were in the vanguard as regards using their own language to write literary works of merit.

== History ==
=== Old Irish, 300s CE—900s CE ===
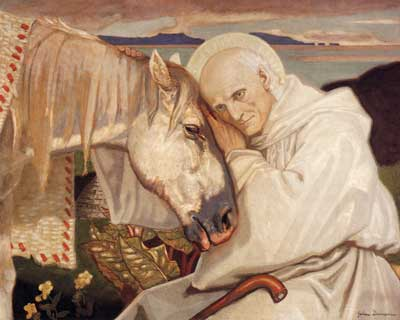
The oldest surviving literature in Gaelic is a piece dedicated to Colm Cille of Iona from the 500s AD.

Before the arrival of Christianity in Ireland, the Gaels had a limited level of literacy in Primitive Irish. This manifested itself in ogham inscriptions in wood and stone; typically memorials to the dead or boundary markers. The traditional stories of the people were circulated in the form of oral culture, rather than written down. Works of a Christian nature were the first to appear in the Sean-Ghaeilge (Old Irish), the earliest form written in Latin script, as it would appear that the Gaelic speaking monks wanted to impart the religion to their flocks in the native tongue. It is thought likely that the first church hymns and prayers were composed in Old Irish as early as the 6th century. The work Amra Choluim Chille is the earliest extant literary work of this nature left to us. It is written in a very early form of the Sean-Ghaeilge, and the meter has an old-fashioned appearance, more so than the rest of the literature of this period. Experts think that it was composed by Dallán Forgaill, towards the end of the 6th century, when Colm Cille had died.

== Main articles ==
- Early Irish literature
- Gaelic type – the writing system used for Early Modern Irish and Modern Irish
