= Journal of Celtic Linguistics =

- Discipline: Linguistics
- Language: English
- Edited by: Simon Rodway

Publication details
- History: 1992–present
- Publisher: University of Wales Press
- Frequency: Annually

Standard abbreviations
- ISO 4: J. Celt. Linguist.

Indexing
- ISSN: 0962-1377

Links
- Journal homepage

The Journal of Celtic Linguistics is a peer-reviewed annual academic journal established in 1992 with the goal of encouraging and publishing original linguistic research in the Celtic languages. The journal is published by the University of Wales Press, but has specialist editors in all six Celtic languages. The current editor-in-chief, since volume 16, is Simon Rodway (Aberystwyth University), who replaced Graham Isaac (National University of Ireland, Galway).
