= Middle Irish =

Goidelic language

- Middle Gaelic
- Gaoidhealg
- Pronunciation: [ˈɡəiðeɫɡ]
- Region: Ireland, Scotland, Isle of Man, North West England
- Era: c. 900–1200
- Language family: Indo-European: Celtic; Insular Celtic; Goidelic; Middle Irish
- Early forms: Primitive Irish: Old Irish
- Writing system: Latin (Gaelic alphabet)

Language codes
- ISO 639-2: mga
- ISO 639-3: mga
- Glottolog: midd1360

Middle Irish, also called Middle Gaelic (Irish: An Mheán-Ghaeilge, Scottish Gaelic: Meadhan-Ghàidhlig, Manx: Mean Ghaelg), is the Goidelic language which was spoken in Ireland, most of Scotland, and the Isle of Man from c. 900–1200 AD; it is therefore a contemporary of Late Old English and Early Middle English. Early Modern Irish, and by extension the modern Goidelic languages—later Modern Irish, Scottish Gaelic and Manx—are all descendants of Middle Irish.

== Phonology ==
=== Consonants ===
Middle Irish retained the Old Irish consonant inventory, though some assimilation and simplification of consonant clusters occurred. Stops were dropped when adjacent to /l/ or /n/, e.g. Old Irish cland ("progeny") > Middle Irish clann /klaN/. /ṽ/ lost its nasalisation before a vowel, e.g. Old Irish memaid (s/he broke) /meṽaðʲ/ > Middle Irish mebaid /mevaðʲ/, while /v/ was nasalised after nV, e.g. Old Irish noeb ("saint") /noiv/ > Middle Irish náem /noiṽ/. Initial /m/ was additionally fortified to /b/ before liquids /r/ and /l/, e.g. Old Irish mrath ̈(treachery) /mraθ/ > Middle Irish brath /braθ/.

		Labial	Dental	Alveolar	Velar	Glottal
Nasal	broad	m	N n		ŋ	
Nasal	slender	mʲ	Nʲ nʲ		ŋʲ	
Plosive	broad	p b	t d		k ɡ	
Plosive	slender	pʲ bʲ	tʲ dʲ		kʲ ɡʲ	
Fricative	broad	f v	θ ð	s	x ɣ	h
Fricative	slender	fʲ vʲ	θʲ ðʲ	sʲ	xʲ ɣʲ	hʲ
Nasalized fricative	broad	ṽ				
Nasalized fricative	slender	ṽʲ				
Approximant	broad		R r			
Approximant	slender		Rʲ rʲ			
Lateral	broad		L l			
Lateral	slender		Lʲ lʲ			

=== Vowels ===
During the Middle Irish Period, the nuclei of multisyllabic vowels shifted from those of Old Irish to the initial secondary articulations of the succeeding syllable, e.g. Old Irish duine ("person") /ˈdu.nʲe/ > */ˈduʲ.nʲe/ > Middle Irish /ˈdʷi.nʲe/. In interconsonantal /e/, this also involved a post-vocalic /ᵃ/ ephentesis, which briefly resulted in /CeᵃC/ before shifting to /CʲaC/, e.g. Old Irish fer ("man") /fʲer/ > */fʲeᵃr/ > Middle Irish fear /fʲar/. Disyllabic proclitics also lost their initial vowels, e.g. Old Irish inna ("of the" [fem.]) > Middle Irish na,. Unstressed vowels were reduced to /ə/, while the Old Irish diphthongs /ai/, /oi/, and /ui/ first shifted to */əi/, and were then monophongised to /əː/. In Ireland, a process of simplifying two vowels in hiatus to a single long vowel occurred except for the late /ia(ː)/ and /ua(ː)/. In Scottish Gaelic, hiatus were retained to the present. These processes created the following inventory of vowels and diphthongs:

	Front	Central	Back
Diphthong	ia iaː		ua uaː
Close	i iː		u uː
Mid	e eː	(ə) əː	o oː
Open	a aː		

== Orthography ==
=== Consonants ===
At the end of the Middle Irish period around 1200, scribes began using digraphs bh, gh, mh to indicate the fricatives /v/, /ɣ/, and /ṽ/ (lenited versions of /b/, /g/, and /m) by analogy with the lenited ch, th, ph. Lenition of these respective stops went unmarked. Diacritics derived from the Ancient Greek rough breathing mark (◌̔) could also be used to represent lenition. (Note: In this article, the early modern ponc séimhithe, or overdot, is used to represent diacritical lenition representations.) However, both methods remained sporadic and irregular until at least the 16th century, in the Early Modern Irish period.

Broad consonant phonemes
Letter	Word-initial			Non-initial	
Letter	unmutated	eclipsed	lenited	single	geminate
b	/b/	⟨mb⟩ /m/	⟨ḃ/bh⟩ /v/		⟨bb⟩ /b/
c	/k/	/ɡ/	⟨ċ/ch⟩ /x/	/k/, /ɡ/	⟨cc⟩ /k/
d	/d/	⟨nd⟩ /N/	⟨ḋ/dh⟩ /ð/		—
f	/f/	/v/	⟨ḟ/fh⟩ / /	/f/	—
g	/ɡ/	⟨ng⟩ /ŋ/	⟨ġ/gh⟩ /ɣ/		—
h	See explanation below				
l	/L/	—	/l/		⟨ll⟩ /L/
m	/m/	—	⟨ṁ/mh⟩ /ṽ/		⟨mm⟩ /m/
n	/N/	—	/n/		⟨nn⟩ /N/
p	/p/	/b/	⟨ṗ/ph⟩ /f/	/p/, /b/	⟨pp⟩ /p/
r	/R/	—	/r/		⟨rr⟩ /R/
s	/s/	—	⟨ṡ/sh⟩ /h/	/s/	—
t	/t/	/d/	⟨ṫ/th⟩ /θ/	/t/, /d/	⟨tt⟩ /t/

=== Vowels ===
The digraph ao was used to indicate the new vowel /əː/, and e or a to stand for /ə/:

Vowels
Letter	Short	Long
a	/a/, /ə/ (Note: Unstressed.)	⟨á⟩ /aː/
e	/ʲe/, /ʲə/ (Note: Unstressed.)	⟨é⟩ /ʲeː/
i	/ʲi/	⟨í⟩ /ʲiː/
o	/o/	⟨ó⟩ /oː/
u	/u/	⟨ú⟩ /uː/
ao	—	/əː/
ia	/ia/	⟨iá⟩ /iaː/
ua	/ua/	⟨uá⟩ /uaː/

In addition to the previously described diphthongs, digraphs could also stand for a vowel followed by an off-glide, which then shifted to a non-palatal /i/ or a palatalised back vowel:

Off-glides (Simplified)
Letter 1	Letter 2	IPA (Early)	IPA (Late)
a, o, u	i	[a o u]ⁱ	i (Note: described as "non-palatal offglide [from the preceding consonant] plus i")
á, ó, ú	i	[a o u]ːⁱ	iː (Note: described as "non-palatal offglide [from the preceding consonant] plus i")
e, i	a, (Note: ea only.) o, u	[e i][ᵃ ᵒ ᵘ]	ʲ[a o u]
é, í	a, á, (Note: éa or eá only.) o, u	[e i]ː[ᵃ ᵒ ᵘ]	ʲ[a o u]ː

== Grammar ==
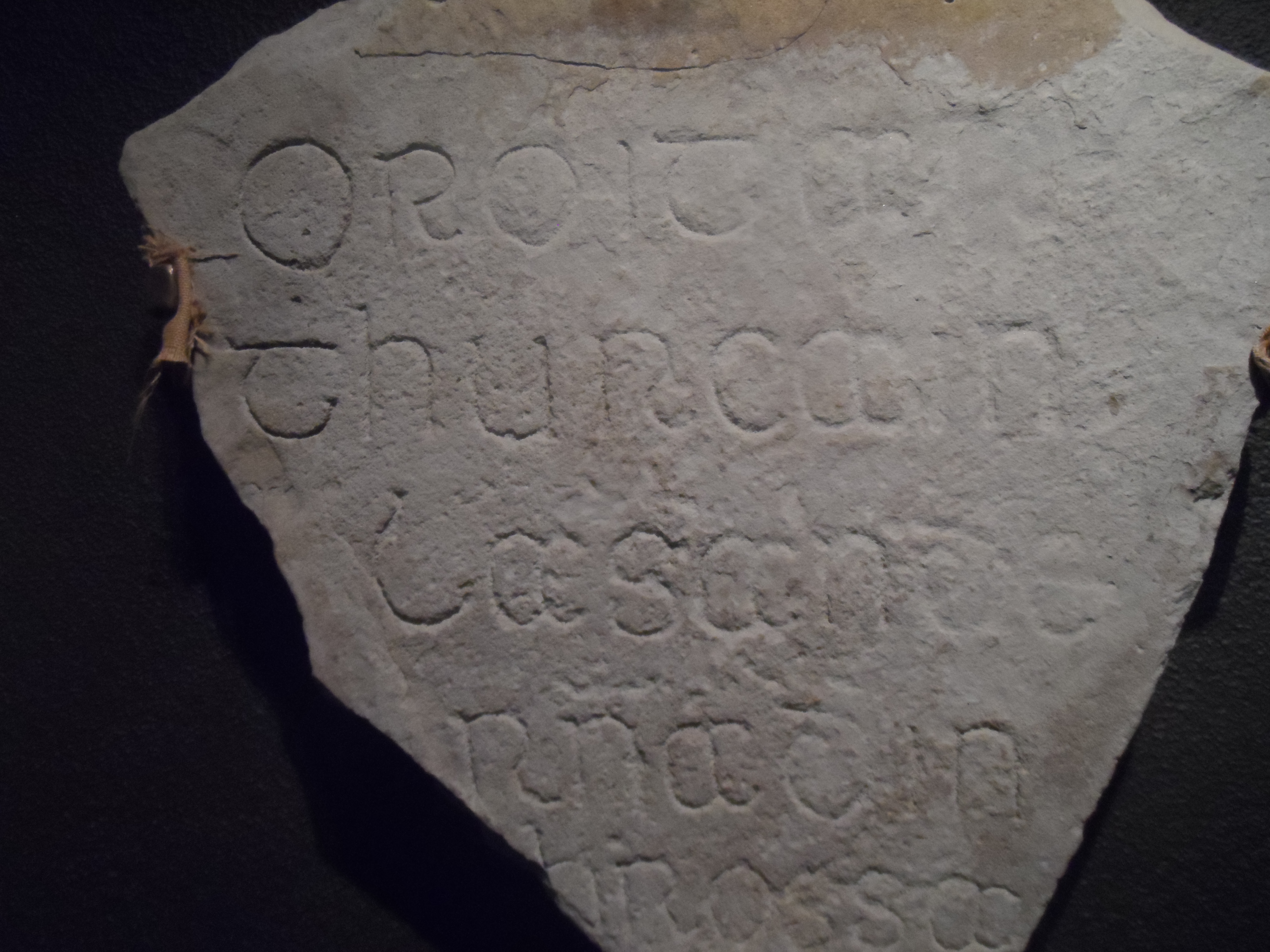
Middle Irish inscription from Clonmacnoise: Oroit ar Thurcain lasan dernad in chrossa: "Pray for Turcan by whom this cross was made."

Middle Irish is a fusional, VSO, nominative-accusative language, and makes frequent use of lenition.

Nouns decline for two genders: masculine and feminine, though traces of neuter declension persist; three numbers: singular, dual, plural; and five cases: nominative, accusative, genitive, prepositional, vocative. Adjectives agree with nouns in gender, number, and case.

Verbs conjugate for three tenses: past, present, future; four moods: indicative, subjunctive, conditional, imperative; independent and dependent forms. Verbs conjugate for three persons and an impersonal, agentless form (agent). There are a number of preverbal particles marking the negative, interrogative, subjunctive, relative clauses, etc.

Prepositions inflect for person and number. Different prepositions govern different cases, depending on intended semantics.

== Sample texts ==
=== Poem on Eogan Bél ===
The following is an untitled poem in Middle Irish about Eógan Bél, King of Connacht.

Middle Irish	Modern Irish	English
Dún Eogain Bél forsind loch forsrala ilar tréntroch,	Dún Eogain Bél fosna locha cois tráthnóna cléir tréan.	Fort of Eoghan the Stammerer upon the lake, enduring its powerful waves.
ní mair Eogan forsind múr ocus maraid in sendún.	ní chónaíonn Eoghan ar an mhuirbhalla ach mhairfidh an sean-dún.	Eoghan no longer lives within the wall, but the old fort remains.
Maraid inad a thige irraibe ’na chrólige,	Fanann áit a theach fá chlúid an aeir,	The place of his dwelling remains under the protection of the wind,
ní mair in rígan re cair nobíd ina chomlepaid.	níl banríon leis an gceartú ná caithfidh sí ina chomhléarscáil.	The queen no longer lives with him, nor must she abide in his companion.
Cairptech in rí robúi and, innsaigthech oirgnech Érenn,	bhí carrthach sa ríocht, an-uaireanta fiach ón Éirinn,	A charioteer was in the kingdom, often indebted from Ireland,
ní dechaid coll cána ar goil, rocroch tríchait im óenboin.	níor shiúl sé coirce cách, rinneadh sceach tríocha timpeall ar a chinn.	He didn't walk the rye's path, a bushel of thirty was hung around his neck.
Roloisc Life co ba shecht, rooirg Mumain tríchait fecht,	scáilteadh na lámha in aois go 30 bliain, dhein Mumhan greim 30 uair,	His hands were stretched until he was thirty years old, Munster grasped thirty times,
nír dál do Leith Núadat nair co nár dámair immarbáig.	níor láidir Leith Núadat ná mí-neart daonra chomh maith.	Leith Núadat was not strong nor of insufficient human force.
Doluid fecht im-Mumain móir do chuinchid argait is óir,	chuaigh sé go minic go Mumhain mór le haghaidh airgid agus óir a bhailiú,	He often went to great Munster to gather silver and gold,
d’iaraid sét ocus móine do gabail gíall [n]dagdóine.	d'fhéach sé taoibh leis agus gearán a dhéanamh faoi ghealladh na ndaoine dána.	He looked around and complained about the promise of the bold people.
Trían a shlúaig dar Lúachair síar co Cnoc mBrénainn isin slíab,	thriail a thríúr a shlí trí Luachair siar go Cnoc mBrénainn san fhásach,	A third of his host went through Luachair westward to Hill of Brénainn in the mountain,
a trían aile úa fo dess co Carn Húi Néit na n-éces.	an tríúr eile thriall siar go Carn Uí Néit i gcéin sna clanna eolais.	Another third went southward to Carn Uí Néit far away in the tribes of knowledge,
Sé fodéin oc Druimm Abrat co trían a shlúaig, nísdermat,	dó féin ag Druim Abhrat le tríúr de a shlua, gan ach suaitheadh,	He himself at Druim Abhrat with three of his host, with no more than a break,
oc loscud Muman maisse, ba subach don degaisse.	ag loiscint Mumhan mar gheall air, bhí sé sona le haghaidh an spóirt.	burning Munster because of him, he was happy for the sport.
Atchím a chomarba ind ríg a mét dorigne d’anfhír,	bhím i mo thodhchaí i gcumhacht a rinne an rí dearmad faoi,	I see his successor in the power the king made a mistake about,
nenaid ocus tromm ’malle, conid é fonn a dúine.	a mhaighdean agus a theampall le chéile, sin an tslí a dúirt an duine.	a maiden and a heavy load together, that's the way the man said.
Dún Eogain.	Dún Eogain.	Fort of Eoghan.

== See also ==
- Dictionary of the Irish Language
