= Primitive Irish =

Pre-6th century Goidelic Celtic language of Ireland and Britain

- Archaic Irish, Proto-Goidelic
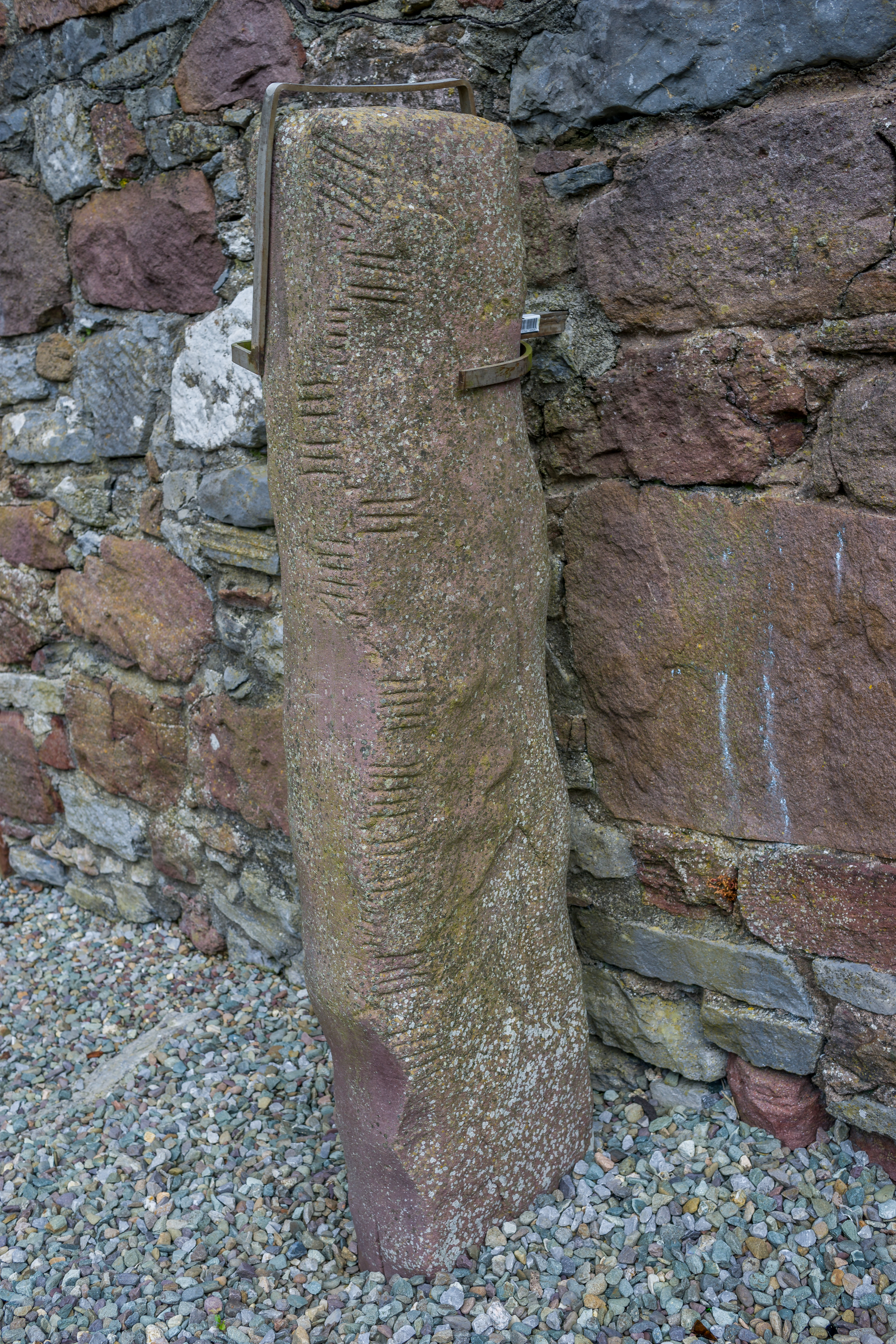
- Ogham stone from Ratass Church, 6th century AD. It reads: [a]nm sillann maq vattillogg ('[in the] name of Sílán son of Fáithloga')
- Native to: Ireland, Isle of Man, western coast of Britain
- Region: Ireland and Britain
- Era: Evolved into Old Irish about the 6th century AD
- Language family: Indo-European: Celtic; Insular Celtic; Goidelic; Primitive Irish
- Writing system: Ogham

Language codes
- ISO 639-3: pgl
- Glottolog: prim1243
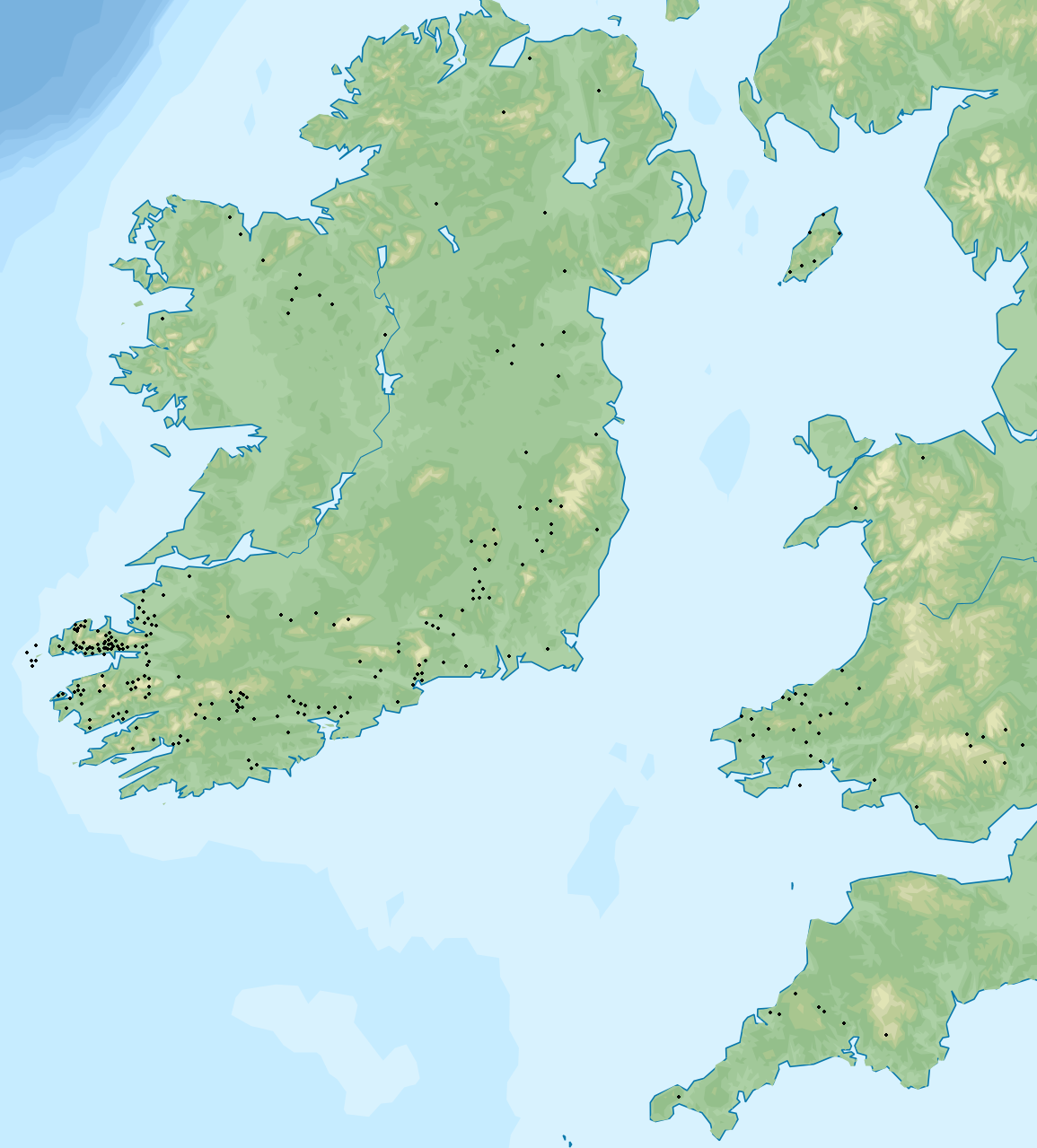
- Map of locations where Orthodox Ogham inscriptions have been found.

Primitive Irish or Archaic Irish (Irish: Gaeilge Ársa, Gaeilge Chianach), also called Proto-Goidelic, is the oldest known form of the Goidelic languages, and the ancestor of all languages within this family.

This phase of the language is known only from fragments, mostly personal names, inscribed on stone in the Ogham alphabet in Ireland and western Great Britain between the 4th and the 6th century AD, before the advent of Old Irish. These inscriptions are referred to as Orthodox Ogham, although scholastic use of the script continued residually until the early 19th century.

== Documentation ==
Primitive Irish is the oldest recorded form of the Goidelic languages. It was written in the Ogham alphabet, the usage of which can be divided into two phases, Orthodox Ogham and Scholastic Ogham.

The former represents the earlier tradition of inscriptions recording an individual's name, optionally with parentage, perhaps as a memorial or indicator of land ownership, whereas the latter resulted from a tradition of scholarly restoration of the writing system as part of the development of a Celtic style of Catholic art, in parallel with the use of the Latin alphabet in ordinary writing. Primitive Irish is known only from Ogham fragments, usually personal names, the earliest being dated by academics to the 4th century, although some estimates for the earliest inscriptions range between the 1st and 5th centuries. Scholars agree that the orthodox written tradition is older than the surviving inscriptions. The latest inscriptions of the orthodox tradition appear to come from the 6th century. The scholastic use of Ogham continued until the early 19th century, the last inscription being found on the tomb of Mary Dempsey at Ahenny in County Tipperary, which is written in both Irish and English.

The original Ogham alphabet contained no letter for /p/, as it had been lost in Proto-Celtic and was therefore absent from inherited Primitive Irish vocabulary. The inscriptions nevertheless preserve archaic Indo-European nominal morphology, particularly in genitive endings, with parallels in other ancient Indo-European languages such as Gaulish, Latin, Attic Greek and Sanskrit. Many of the characteristics of modern (and medieval) Irish, such as initial mutations, distinct "broad" and "slender" consonants and consonant clusters, are not yet represented in the earliest inscriptions.

The physical form of Ogham has affected how Primitive Irish is preserved. In its monumental form, the script is normally cut along the arris or edge of a stone, using that edge as a stem-line. Letters consist of groups of one to five strokes or notches arranged in relation to the stem-line, and inscriptions are commonly read beginning at the lower left edge and continuing upwards, across the top, and sometimes down the other side. This three-dimensional arrangement is one reason why worn or damaged inscriptions can be difficult to read, since the text is often located on the most exposed part of the monument. Although ogham could represent many of the phonological distinctions of early Primitive Irish, it did not mark vowel length, and it became increasingly unsuitable as the sound system changed toward Old Irish. In particular, later contrasts such as palatalised consonants, lenited fricatives, and other consonantal distinctions are often not directly visible in the inscriptions and have to be inferred indirectly.

More than 300 Ogham inscriptions are known in Ireland, including 121 in County Kerry and 81 in County Cork, and more than 75 found outside Ireland in western Britain and the Isle of Man, including more than 40 in Wales, where Irish colonists settled in the 3rd century, and about 30 in Scotland, although some of these are in Pictish. Many of the British inscriptions are bilingual in Irish and Latin; however, none show any sign of the influence of Christianity or Christian epigraphic tradition, suggesting they date from before 391, when Christianity became the official religion of the Roman Empire. Only about a dozen of the Irish inscriptions show any such sign. There is speculation about the orthodoxy of one inscription in Hampshire and two in Scotland, but there is no academic consensus on the matter.

The majority of ogham inscriptions are memorials, consisting of the name of the deceased in the genitive case, followed by MAQI, MAQQI, "[the stone] of the son" (Modern Irish mic), and the name of his father, or AVI, AVVI, "[the stone] of the grandson", (Modern Irish uí) and the name of his grandfather, e.g. DALAGNI MAQI DALI, "[the stone] of Dalagnos son of Dalos". Sometimes the phrase MAQQI MUCOI, "of the son of the tribe", is used to show tribal affiliation. Inscriptions demonstrating additional information are rare, such as QRIMTIR RON[A]NN MAQ COMOGANN, "[the stone] of the priest Ronán son of Comgán". Some inscriptions appear to be border markers.

=== Corpus and cataloguing ===
Modern study of Primitive Irish inscriptions uses several overlapping cataloguing systems. The mid-20th-century reference point is R. A. S. Macalister's Corpus Inscriptionum Insularum Celticarum (CIIC), while later digital catalogues include the Celtic Inscribed Stones Project (CISP) at University College London, which was created to compile an accessible database of early medieval Celtic inscriptions from Celtic-speaking regions. CISP organises its records into site, stone, and inscription data, including location, physical characteristics, readings, expansions, bibliography, and images where available.

Digital research has increasingly focused on the documentation and analysis of Ogham inscriptions. The Ogham in 3D project digitises Ogham stones and their inscriptions through a searchable database with three-dimensional models.

== Transition to Old Irish ==
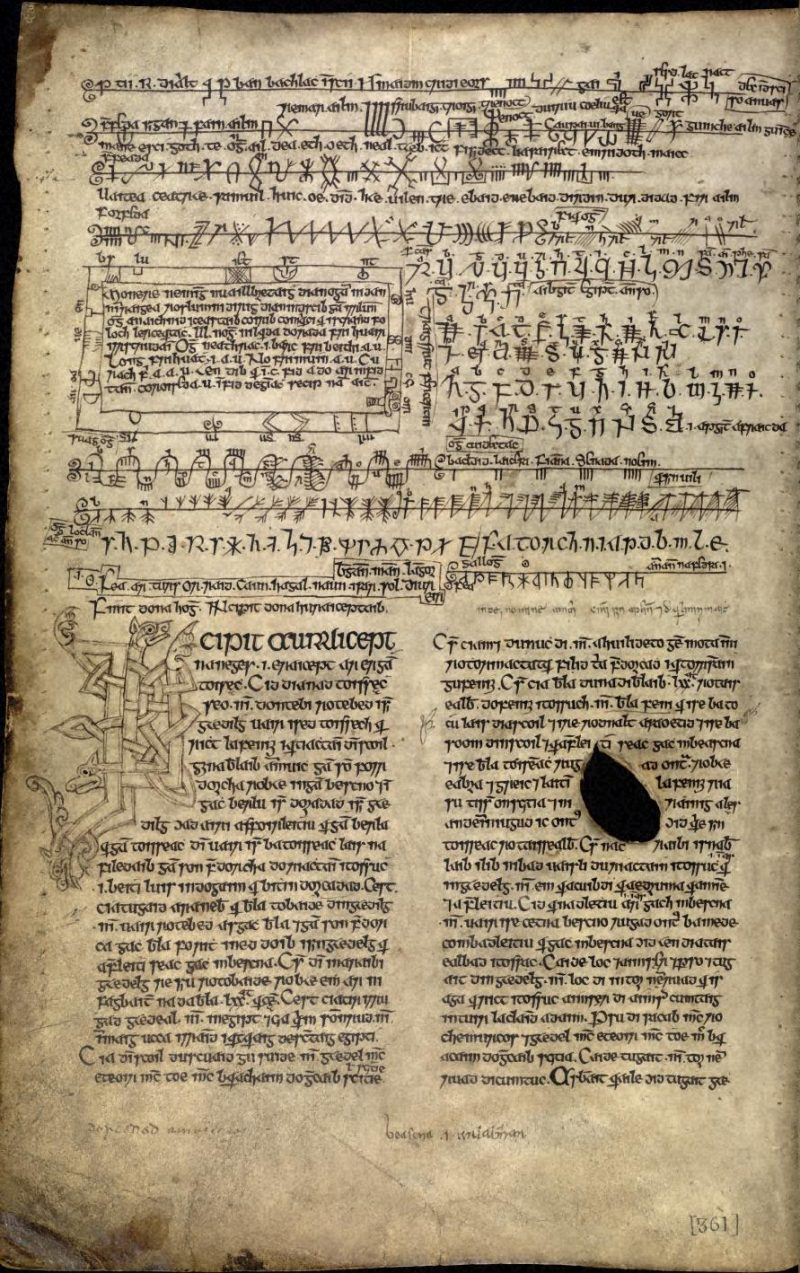
Folio of Auraicept na n-Éces contrasting Ogham and Latin scripts.

Old Irish, written in the Latin alphabet, has its earliest recorded texts possibly in the late 6th century; this is the traditional date of composition for the Amra Coluim Chille, a poetic elegy to St Columba of Iona by St Dallán Forgaill, the first identifiable author in the Irish language. This work, however, survives only in heavily annotated manuscripts from a later time, in an old-fashioned form of the Irish language bearing little similarity to formal Old Irish. The first texts which are widely accepted to have been written in Old Irish date from the 7th century, at the inception of a national textual tradition which was cultivated alongside that of Latin by the Catholic Church in Ireland, and which supplanted the archaic literary traditions.

The radical changes that characterize the transition from Primitive Irish to Old Irish are not uncommon in the development of other languages, but appear to have occurred rapidly in the case of Irish. John T. Koch, an American Celticist, theorized that these changes coincide with the conversion of the island to Christianity and the introduction of Latin as a literary language. The Irish language would then have derogated from the formal register of the language used by druids in their ceremonies and teachings. Koch believed that with the decline of the pre-Christian religions and the corresponding loss of influence by the druids, the language of the Irish Christian nobility would have supplanted the ancient Primitive Irish register of the pre-Christian priests, eclipsing it completely in the 7th century. This would give the impression of rapid linguistic development, while actually representing a shift in literature to a vernacular register which had previously been obscured by the conservative influence of the druidic language. This new phase of the language shows influence from Latin, the latter having been introduced to pre-Christian Ireland, which influence became more pronounced following St Patrick's ministry.

=== Features ===
Primitive Irish has a morphology similar to other Indo-European languages, however it did not display the most distinctive characteristics of other phases of the language including velarized ("broad") and palatalized ("slender") consonants (such consonant alterations may have existed, but they would have been allophonic), initial mutations, some loss of inflectional endings, but not of case marking, and consonant clusters. Old Irish does carry with it these distinctive features, as well as the loss of grammatical suffixes, the introduction of the letter p through loanwords and proper names, the simplification of the inflectional system, the alteration of some short vowels through vowel harmony, and, most notably, vowel elisions which resulted in distinctive consonant clusters.

This last phenomenon, especially marked in the genesis of Old Irish proper, began with an application of secondary stress to the third syllable of most words with four or more syllables, and also to the fifth syllable of words with six or more, in addition to the primary stress, which fell on the first syllable, as is typical of Celtic languages. This caused apocope of (final) syllables, syncope of stressless (internal) syllables, and the shortening of all long vowels in non-initial syllables, around 500 AD and the middle of the 6th century, respectively. This loss of vowels caused consonant clusters to develop.

As an example, a 5th-century king of Leinster, whose name is recorded in Old Irish king-lists and annals as Mac Caírthinn Uí Enechglaiss, is memorialised on an Ogham stone near where he died. This gives the late Primitive Irish version of his name (in the genitive case), as Maqi Cairatini avi Ineqaglas. Similarly, the Corcu Duibne, a people of County Kerry known from Old Irish sources, are memorialised on a number of stones in their territory as Dovinias. Old Irish filed, "poet (gen.)", appears in ogham as velitas. In each case the development of Primitive to Old Irish shows the loss of unstressed syllables and certain consonant changes.

Gradually, the grammaticalization of consonant mutations introduced a new characteristic that Irish would eventually share with all other modern Celtic languages. Old Irish phonetic conditions generated different allophonic mutations over time, and with the diachronic loss of the conditions which caused the mutations, those mutations became the only way to distinguish between different grammatical forms. Thus, the mutations became differentiated phonemes with their own morphosyntactic functions. For example, in the Primitive Irish phrase sindhi maqqi ("of the son", sindhi being a form of the definite article), originally pronounced ˈsɪndiː ˈmakʷiː, the initial M would have lenited to /β̃/ due to the influence of the -i ending of the preceding word. The variation in the pronunciation of the word would not have caused a difference in meaning; it would be allophonic. In a later stage of the language, the Primitive Irish word sindhi became Old Irish in, losing the final vowel which caused the lenition. However, in the Old Irish phrase in maicc ("of the son"), the m is still lenited, so the pronunciation would be /ɪn β̃ak/. The lenition was 'reinterpreted' as being caused by the fact that maicc follows the definite article in, a rule of morphosyntax (grammar) rather than phonology. What was originally a phonological feature of the language therefore became grammaticalized.

== Phonology ==
It is possible, through comparisons with other languages, to reconstruct a phonemic inventory for the properly attested stages of the language using the names used in the scholastic tradition for each letter of the Ogham alphabet, which are recorded in the Latin alphabet in later manuscripts.

=== Vowels ===
	Monophthongs		Diphthongs
Close	i iː	u uː	
Mid	e eː	o oː	oĭ
Open	a aː		aĭ

There is a certain amount of obscurity in the vowel inventory of Primitive Irish: while the letters Ailm, Onn and Úr are recognized by modern scholars as representing /a(ː)/, /o(ː)/ and /u(ː)/ respectively, there is some difficulty in reconstructing the values of Edad and Idad. They are poorly attested, and scholars believe the distinction between them might be arbitrary, in the same way as the runes peorð and cweorð in the Anglo-Saxon alphabet, but they are transcribed as E and O, respectively, and probably had the respective pronunciations of /e(ː)/ and /o(ː)/. There were also two diphthongs, transcribed as ai and oi.

In later stages of the language, scholastic Oghamist traditions incorporated five new letters for vowels, called forfeda (supplementary), corresponding to digraphs of the orthodox spelling, but these no longer corresponded to Primitive Irish sounds.

=== Consonants ===
The consonant inventory of Primitive Irish is reconstructed by Celticist Damian McManus as follows:

Consonants of Primitive Irish in IPA
	Bilabial		Alveolar		Palatal	Velar		Labiovelar (Note: In Old Irish, these consonants had disappeared. The stops merged with their simple velar counterparts, while /w/ became /f/.)	
Nasal	m		n						
Stop	p (Note: The sound /p/ was absent in Primitive Irish, but a letter in scholastic ogham was created for the late introduction of this sound, called Pín, Ifín or Iphín, the only forfeda with a consonant value, although often used as an equivalent to the digraphs io, ía and ia in Latin spelling. In early loanwords, the Latin letter P was incorporated as Q, for example Primitive Irish QRIMITIR from Latin presbyter.)	b	t	d		k	ɡ	kʷ	ɡʷ
Fricative (Note: The fricatives /f, v, θ, ð, x, ɣ, h, and β̃/ emerged by the 5th century with the advent of phonetic séimhiú (lenition). In turn, their non-lenited counterparts occasionally and inconsistently became geminates.)			s, sᵗ (Note: The sound /s/ in scholastic ogham was represented by two letters: Sail and Straif, the latter probably representing a previously distinct sound such as /st/ or /sw/ (it was relatively rare and corresponded to Indo-European words containing /sw/). However, the two sounds had likely merged by the Old Irish period, except in their respective lenited forms.)						
Approximant					j (Note: Lost in later stages.)			ʍ	w
Lateral			l						
Trill			ɾ						

The letters Cért, Gétal and Straif, transliterated as q, ng (or gg) and z, respectively, were known by the ancient scholastic Oghamists as foilceasta (questions) due to the obsolescence of their original pronunciations: the first two, /kʷ/ and /ɡʷ/, had merged with plain velars in Old Irish, and the third, probably /st/, merged with /s/. However, evidence of the original distinction between straif and sail was still present into the Old Irish period, as the séimhiú (lenition) of /s/ produced /f/ (< Primitive Irish /w/) for lexemes originally represented by Straif but /h/ for lexemes originally represented by Sail. (Note: The lenited form strengthens the opinion that the basal form had an older, Indo-European derived pronunciation /sw/ that had apparently evolved into /st/ at some point later, but which retained the lenited form */hw/ for some time, which could easily have later evolved into /w/ or /f/.)

The letter Úath or hÚath (transliterated as h), although not counted among the foilceasta, also presented particular difficulties due to apparently being a silent letter. It was probably pronounced as /j/ in an early stage of Primitive Irish, disappearing before the transition to Old Irish.

Consonant lenition and palatalisation, which feature heavily in later stages of the language, may already have existed in an allophonic form; that is, they were not yet phonemically contrastive.

=== Phonological history ===
McManus describes the following sound shifts from Proto-Celtic as being attested in the earliest Primitive Irish inscriptions:

- A loss of /n/ before /t/ and /k/, resulting in the gemination of the following sound: *nt, *nk > tː, kː
- Loss of intervocalic *sː /s/ > Ø / V _ V
- Monophthongization of *ouː /ou/ > /oː/
- Unrounding of *o in final unstressed syllables

== Grammar ==
The brevity of most orthodox ogham inscriptions makes it difficult to analyse the archaic Irish language in depth. The inscriptions consist overwhelmingly of personal names and genealogical formulae, so they give little or no direct evidence for verbal morphology, clause structure, or ordinary syntax. Stifter notes that the inscriptions do not provide evidence for verbal morphology or syntax apart from the ordering of genitives after their head nouns. Since later Irish and the earliest British Celtic languages are VSO languages, the same word order is commonly assumed for Primitive Irish, but it is not directly evinced by the Ogham material.

but it is possible to understand the basis of its phonology and the rudiments of its nominal morphology.

=== Morphology ===
Surviving Ogham inscriptions are written exclusively with nouns. It is possible to deduce some morphological features of Primitive Irish nouns from these inscriptions. With the exception of a few inscriptions in the singular dative case, two in the plural genitive case and one in the singular nominative case, most known inscriptions of nouns in orthodox Ogham are found in the singular genitive, so it is difficult to fully describe their morphology. The German philologist Sabine Ziegler, however, drawing parallels with reconstructions of the Proto-Celtic language's morphology (whose nouns are classified according to the vowels that characterize their endings), limited the archaic Irish endings of the singular genitive case to -i, -as, -os and -ais.

The first ending, -i, is found in words equivalent to the so-called Proto-Celtic category of *o-stem nouns. This category was also recorded in the dative case using -U, with an inscription possibly in the nominative case also using -U. -os, in turn, is equivalent to Proto-Celtic *i-stems and *u-stems, while -as corresponds to *ā-stems. The exact function of -ais remains unclear.

Furthermore, according to Damian McManus, Proto-Celtic nasal, dental, and velar stems also correspond to the Primitive Irish -as genitive, attested in names such as Glasiconas, Cattubuttas, and Lugudeccas.

== See also ==
- Irish language
- Early Irish literature
- Goidelic substrate hypothesis
- Phonological history of Old Irish

== Bibliography ==
- Carney, James (1975). "The invention of the Ogom cipher". Ériu. 26: 53–65. ISSN 0332-0758.
- Conroy, Kevin M. (2008). Celtic initial consonant mutations – nghath and bhfuil?. Linguistics (B.A. thesis). Boston, MA: Boston College. hdl:2345/530. Archived from the original on 27 December 2024 – via bc.edu.
- Garrett, Andrew (1999). "On the Prosodic Phonology of Ogam Irish". Ériu. 50: 63–82. JSTOR 30007732.
- Green, Antony Dubach (1996). "Some effects of the Weight-to-Stress Principle and grouping harmony in the Goidelic languages". Working Papers of the Cornell Phonetics Laboratory. 11: 117–155.
- Green, Antony Dubach (1997). The Prosodic Structure of Irish, Scots Gaelic, and Manx (PhD). Rutgers University. doi:10.7282/T38W3C3K. Archived from the original on 26 November 2021 – via rucore.libraries.rutgers.edu.
- Eska, Joseph F. (2020). "Interarticulatory Timing and Celtic Mutations". Journal of Celtic Linguistics. 21 (1): 235–255. doi:10.16922/jcl.21.7. S2CID 213769085 – via IngentaConnect.
- Eska, Joseph (2009) [1993]. "The emergence of the Celtic languages". In Ball, Martin J.; Müller, Nicole (eds.). The Celtic Languages. London, UK / New York, NY: Routledge. pp. 22–27. ISBN 978-0415422796.
- Fanning, T.; Ó Corráin, D. (1977). "An Ogham stone and cross-slab from Ratass church". Journal of the Kerry Archaeological and Historical Society. 10: 14–18. ISSN 0085-2503.
- Harvey, Anthony (1987). "The Ogam inscriptions and their geminate consonant symbols". Ériu. 38: 45–71. ISSN 0332-0758.
- Jackson, Kenneth (1953). Language and History in Early Britain: A chronological survey of the Brittonic languages 1st to 12th c. AD. Edinburgh, UK: Edinburgh University Press.
- Koch, John (1995). "The conversion of Ireland and the emergence of the Old Irish language, AD 367–637". Emania. 13: 39–50. ISSN 0951-1822. Archived from the original on 12 October 2023 – via academia.edu.
- Koch, John (2006). Celtic Culture: A historical encyclopedia. Bloomsbury Academic. ISBN 1851094407. Archived from the original on 2 April 2025 – via Google.
- Macalister, R. A. S. (1949). Corpus Inscriptionum Insularum Celticarum. Irish Manuscripts Commission. Vol. 1–2. Dublin: Stationery Office.
- MacKillop, James (1998). Dictionary of Celtic Mythology. Oxford, UK: Oxford University Press. ISBN 0198691572.
- McManus, Damian (1983). "A chronology of the Latin loan-words in Early Irish". Ériu. 34: 21–71. ISSN 0332-0758.
- McManus, Damian (1988). "Irish letter-names and their kennings". Ériu. 39: 127–168. ISSN 0332-0758.
- McManus, Damian (1991). A Guide to Ogam. Maynooth Monographs. Vol. 4. Maynooth, IE: An Sagart. ISBN 9781870684170.
- Edwards, Nancy (2006). The Archaeology of Early Medieval Ireland. Abingdon, UK: Routledge. ISBN 9780415220002.
- Ó Cróinín, Dáibhí (1995). Early Medieval Ireland 400–1200. Longman History of Ireland. Harlow, UK: Longman. ISBN 0582015650 – via Google.
- Richter, Michael (2005). Medieval Ireland: The enduring tradition. New Gill History of Ireland. Vol. 1. London, UK: Gill & MacMillan. ISBN 0717132935 – via Google.
- Scannell, Kevin (2020). "Neural Models for Predicting Celtic Mutations". Proceedings of the 1st Joint Workshop on Spoken Language Technologies for Under-resourced Languages and Collaboration and Computing for Under-Resourced Languages: 1–8. ISBN 9791095546351. Archived from the original on 5 August 2022 – via ACL Anthology.
- Schmidt, Sophie C.; Thiery, Florian (2022). "SPARQLing Ogham Stones: New Options for Analyzing Analog Editions by Digitization in Wikidata" (PDF). Proceedings of the 26th International Conference on Theory and Practice of Digital Libraries. CEUR Workshop Proceedings. Vol. 3110. pp. 211–244. doi:10.5281/zenodo.6380914.
- Schrijver, Peter (2015) [2011]. Pruners and trainers of the Celtic family tree: The rise and development of Celtic in the light of language contact. XIV International Congress of Celtic Studies, Maynooth University. Dublin, IE: Dublin Institute for Advanced Studies. pp. 191–219. ISBN 978-185500229-6.
- Stifter, David (2009) [1993]. "Early Irish". In Ball, Martin J.; Müller, Nicole (eds.). The Celtic Languages. London, UK / New York, NY: Routledge. pp. 55–116. ISBN 978-0415422796.
- Stifter, David (2006). Sengoidelc: Old Irish for beginners. Syracuse, NY: Syracuse University Press. p. 30. ISBN 978-0815630722.
- Stifter, David; White, Nora; Forsyth, Katherine (2023). "Early Literacy and Multilingualism in Ireland and Britain". In Mullen, Alex; Woudhuysen, George (eds.). Languages and Communities in the Late-Roman and Post-Imperial Western Provinces. Oxford University Press. pp. 203–235. doi:10.1093/oso/9780198888956.003.0008.
- Stokes, Whitley (2002) [1886]. "Celtic declension". In Davis, Daniel (ed.). The Development of Celtic Linguistics, 1850-1900. Vol. 5. New York, NY: Routledge. ISBN 0415226996.
- Thurneysen, Rudolf (1993) [1946]. A Grammar of Old Irish (Revised and enlarged with supplement ed.). Dublin, IE: School of Celtic Studies, Dublin Institute for Advanced Studies. ISBN 1855001616.
- White, Nora (2021). Ogham Stones in Ireland. Our Ancient Landscapes. The Heritage Council. ISBN 978-1-906304-57-7.
- Ziegler, Sabine (1994) [1991]. Die Sprache der altirischen Ogam-Inschriften [The Language of the Old Irish Ogham Inscriptions] (in German). Göttingen, DE: Vandenhoeck & Ruprecht. ISBN 3525262256 – via Google.
