= Maud Joynt =

Irish Celtic scholar and linguist

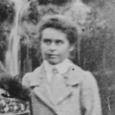
- Maud Joynt at the School of Irish Learning in 1913
- Born: Maud Anna Evens Joynt; 7 March 1868; Woodberry House, Athlone, County Roscommon, Ireland
- Died: 24 July 1940 (aged 72); Dublin, Ireland
- Education: Royal University of Ireland; School of Irish Learning; University of Liverpool
- Occupations: Celtologist; linguist; teacher

Maud Joynt (7 March 1868 – 24 July 1940) was an Irish Celtologist, linguist and teacher.

== Early life and education ==
Maud Anna Evens Joynt was born on 7 March 1868 at Woodberry House in Athlone, County Roscommon to Christopher Joynt and Lily Anna Joynt (née Holton). Joynt's father was a brigade surgeon in the Bombay army, and was later appointed Deputy Surgeon-General of the British Indian Army. Joynt was one of 10 siblings, and was the paternal cousin of the engineer and Irish-language enthusiast Earnán De Siúnta (né Ernest Edwin Joynt; 1874–1949).

Joynt spent part of her childhood in India. By the age of five, Joynt had been taught a small amount of Greek by her father. She attended a private school in Bray, County Wicklow in 1881, going on to attend Alexandra College from 1882. She attained first place in both grades of the intermediate examinations of 1883–4. Joynt entered the Royal University of Ireland (RUI) in 1886 and went on to graduate with first-class honours in modern literature, a Bachelor of Arts in 1889 followed by a Master of Arts in 1890.

== Career ==
After a period of teaching at Jersey Ladies' College, St Helier, Joynt was one of two governesses who assisted the first lady principal of the MacArthur Hall of Residence for girls, Methodist College Belfast, Elizabeth C. Shillington, in 1891. She also taught German whilst working there. She left this post in 1894 to continue her studies in Paris, Florence, and Heidelberg. Upon her return, she took up a position in Alexandra College in December 1895, teaching German and English literature. During this time, she also lectured girls preparing for the BA examinations of the RUI in Loreto Hall and Dominican College. During her time at Alexandra College, Joynt was an active member of a number of societies, including the Literary Society and the Students' Union. She left Alexandra College in 1906 when she was appointed assistant examiner in English for the board of intermediate education.

During her attendance at the School of Irish Learning in 1906 and 1907, Joynt developed an interest in the revival of the Irish language. She studied Old and Middle Irish, palaeography and Welsh at the School. From 1907 to 1908, she enrolled in a Celtic Studies course by Kuno Meyer at the University of Liverpool. In January 1909, Joynt was appointed alongside Mary E. Byrne as assistants working on the Dictionary of Old Irish in Royal Irish Academy. The 1932 second fascicule (letter E) was arranged by Joynt and Eleanor Knott. She went on to arrange M (1939), N O P (1941), and R (1944), and collaborate with others on S (1953).

In 1911 she entered "disenfranchised" as her disability and despite her brother being a Methodist minister the census return recorded her religion as "no church". The enumerator tried to "correct" some of her details although she recorded that she could speak English and with modesty "some Irish" as she was working on the Irish Dictionary.

She went on to edit two volumes in the Mediaeval and Modern Irish Series: Tromdámh Gùaire (1932) and Feis Tighe Chonáin (1936). She also contributed to Alexandra College Magazine, Celtica, Celtic Review, Ériu, and New Ireland Review. Joynt was one of the contributors of Kuno Meyer's 1912 Miscellany edited by Osborn Bergin and Carl Marstrander.

Joynt was involved in the Irish Women's Franchise League and Irish Women's Progressive Union. From 1902, Joynt was an active committee member of the Women Graduates and Candidate Graduates Association, a group advocating for women's rights in higher education. She served as the honorary secretary from 1907 to 1913. She resigned in 1913 due to her own workload, with the group disbanding in the same year. Joynt was accepted into the Gorsedd at an Eisteddfod, for her contributions to Celtic scholarship. She was awarded a Doctor of Letters by the National University of Ireland in 1937 for her scholarly work and her advocacy of women in university education. Joynt was a supporter of the Irish literary revival, a regular attendee of the early Abbey Theatre and lectures of the Irish Literary Society.

== Personal life ==
Over the course of her life, Joynt had become a vegetarian, Buddhist, and feminist. She was vice-president of the Irish Vegetarian Society.

Joynt went deaf in old age, but she continued studying until her death. She lived most of her adult life in Ranelagh and Rathmines, but her last address was 69 St Stephens Green. Joynt died on 24 July 1940, in a Portobello nursing home. She is buried in Mount Jerome Cemetery.

== Selected works ==
- Golden Legends of the Gael (1924)
- The Life of St Gall (1927)
- Christianity in Celtic lands: A History of the Churches of the Celts, their Origin, their Development, Influence and Mutual Relations (1932) - translation of Chrétientés celtiques by Dom Louis Gougaud
