= Compert Con Culainn =

Early medieval Irish narrative

- "The Conception of Cú Chulainn"
- Also known as: Feis Tige Becfholtaig (2nd recension); Gineamain Chonculainn
- Language: Old and Middle Irish
- Manuscript(s): Recension I: LU, RIA 23 N 10, D IV 2, BL Egerton 1782, BL Egerton 88, TCD MS 1363, NLI Phillipps G 7, TCD MS 1287. Recension II: Egerton 1782 and D IV 2.
- Personages: Cú Chulainn (Sétanta), Conchobor, Deichtine, Lug

Compert Con Culainn (English: The Conception of Cú Chulainn) is an early medieval Irish narrative about the conception and birth of the hero Cú Chulainn. Part of the Ulster Cycle of Irish mythology, it survives in two major versions.

== Manuscripts ==
The tale exists in two main recensions. The earliest witness of the first version is the Lebor na hUidre (LU), compiled in the 12th century. The principal scribe (M) was responsible for writing down the main text, while a later reviser (H) erased the ending to make room for his own sequel from the time of Cú Chulainn's birth. According to H's notes, the text was included in the Cín Dromma Snechtai, an 8th-century manuscript now lost. Further copies of Recension I have come down in six manuscripts of the 15th and 16th centuries, all of them in some way associated with Connacht.

The second recension survives in Egerton 1782 and D IV 2, where they immediately follow the first. This recension is also called Feis Tige Becfholtaig “The feast of (or: passing of the night in) Becfholtach's house” in D IV 2.

- Cín Dromma Snechtai (lost)
- Dublin, Royal Irish Academy, Lebor na hUidre (23 E 25): p 128a-b (+H). End missing.
- Dublin, Royal Irish Academy, 23 N 10: pp. 62–63.
- Dublin, Royal Irish Academy, D IV 2 (Stowe 992): f 46rb-47vb. Both versions.
- London, British Library, Egerton 1782: f 78v-80r. Both versions.
- London, British Library, Egerton 88: f 12vb-13rb. Entitled Gineamain Chonculainn.
- Dublin, Trinity College Dublin, MS 1363 (olim H 4.22): IV, pp. 46–47.
- Dublin, National Library of Ireland, (Phillipps) G 7: col. 7–9.
- Cf: Dublin, Trinity College Dublin, MS 1287 (olim H 1.13), p. 342 ff.

== Summary ==
In the earliest version of Compert Chon Culainn, Cú Chulainn's mother Deichtine is the daughter and charioteer of Conchobar mac Nessa, king of Ulster, and accompanies him as he and the nobles of Ulster hunt a flock of magical birds. Snow falls, and the Ulstermen seek shelter, finding a house where they are made welcome. Their host's wife goes into labour, and Deichtine assists at the birth of a baby boy. A mare gives birth to two colts at the same time. The next morning, the Ulstermen find themselves at the Brug na Bóinde (the Neolithic mound at Newgrange). The house and its occupants have disappeared, but the child and the colts remain. Deichtine takes the boy home and raises him to early childhood, but he falls sick and dies. The god Lug appears to her and tells her he was their host that night, and that he has put his child in her womb, who is to be called Sétanta. Her pregnancy is a scandal as she is betrothed to Sualtam mac Róich, and the Ulstermen suspect Conchobar of being the father, so she aborts the child and goes to her husband's bed "virgin-whole". She then conceives a son whom she names Sétanta. This has been interpreted as a triple conception, marking the child out as someone special.

In the later, and better-known, version of Compert Con Culainn, Deichtine is Conchobar's sister, and disappears from Emain Macha, the Ulster capital. As in the previous version, the Ulstermen go hunting a flock of magical birds, are overtaken by a snowstorm and seek shelter in a nearby house. Their host is Lug, but this time his wife, who gives birth to a son that night, is Deichtine herself. The child is named Sétanta.

The nobles of Ulster argue over which of them is to be his foster-father, until the wise Morann decides he should be fostered by several of them: Conchobar himself; Sencha mac Ailella, who will teach him judgement and eloquent speech; the wealthy Blaí Briugu, who will protect and provide for him; the noble warrior Fergus mac Róich, who will care for him and teach him to protect the weak; the poet Amergin, who will educate him, and his wife Findchóem, who will nurse him. He is brought up in the house of Amergin and Findchóem on Muirthemne Plain in modern County Louth, alongside their son Conall Cernach.

== Sources ==
=== Editions and translations ===
- Hamel, A.G. van (ed.). Compert Con Culainn and other stories. MMIS 3. Dublin, 1933 (reprinted 1978). pp. 1–8. Based on Lebor na hUidre. Edition available from CELT.
- Windisch, Ernst (ed. and tr.). “Die Geburt Cuchulainn's.” Irische Texte mit Wörterbuch I. Leipzig 1880. pp. 134–45. LU and Egerton 1782. Errata published in Revue Celtique 5: p. 237.
- Thurneysen, Rudolf (ed.and tr.). “[VII] Compert ConCulainn nach der Handschrift von Druim Snechta.” and “[VIII] Compert ConCulaind nach D. 4. 2.” In Zu irischen Handschriften und Literaturdenkmälern. Berlin, 1912. pp. 31–41 (LU, Egerton 88, 23 N 10 and H 4.22) and 41-8 (first version of D IV 2).
- Meyer, Kuno (ed. and tr.). “Feis Tige Becfoltaig.” Zeitschrift für celtische Philologie 5 (1905): 500–4. Second version of D IV 2.
- Hull, Vernam. “The Version of Compert Con Culainn in MS. Phillipps G 7.” Zeitschrift für celtische Philologie 24 (1954): pp. 128–31. Phillipps G 7.
- Nettlau, Max (ed.). Revue Celtique 10: 457. H 4.22.
- Hull, Eleanor (tr.). "The Birth of Cuchulainn." The Cuchullin Saga. 15–20. Adapted from Duvau's (French) translation. PDF available from Google Books (US only).
- Gantz, Jeffrey (tr.). "The Birth of Cú Chulaind." Early Irish Myths and Sagas. 1981 (1983 repr.). pp. 130–2.
- Kinsella, Thomas (tr.). The Táin. Dublin: Dolmen, 1969.
- Cross, T.P. and C.H. Slover (eds). Ancient Irish Tales. New York, 1936. 134–6.
- Thurneysen, Rudolf (tr.). “Setantas Geburt." Sagen aus dem alten Irland. Berlin, 1901. 6.-6.
- Duvau, Louis (tr.). "La légende de la conception de Cûchulainn." Revue Celtique 9 (1888): 1-13.
- Duvau, Louis (tr.). L'Épopée celtique en Irlande. pp. 22–33 [A].
- Duvau, Louis (tr.). L'Épopée celtique en Irlande, pp. 33–38 [B].
- Guyonvarc'h, Christian-J. (tr.). "La conception de Cuchulainn." Ogam 17 (1965): pp. 363–91. Version 1 (LU, Egerton 1782) and version 2 (Egerton 1782, D IV 2). Followed by commentary by F. Le Roux, pp. 393–410.
- Even, Arzel (tr.). “La conception de Cuchulainn.” Ogam 4 (1952): pp. 273–6. Egerton 1782, version 2.
- Even, Arzel (tr.). “La conception de Cuchulainn, selon le Libur Dromma Snechta.” Ogam 5 (1953): pp. 313–4.

=== References ===
- Ó Concheanainn, Tomás. "The textual tradition of Compert Con Culainn." Celtica 21 (1990): 441–55.
- MS Omit
- Scéla

=== Further reading ===
- Hollo, Kaarina. “Cú Chulainn and Síd Truim.” Ériu 49 (1998): pp. 13–22.
- Zimmer, Heinrich. “Keltische Studien V. Über den compilatorischen charakter der irischen sagentexte im sogenannten Lebor na hUidre .i. Compert Conculaind.” Zeitschrift für vergleichende Sprachforschung 28 (1887): pp. 419–26.
