= Joynt =

Joynt is an Irish surname of Huguenot origin meaning graceful or slim.

- Carol Joynt, American author and television interviewer
- Chris Joynt (born 1971), English rugby league footballer
- Hartley Joynt (1938–2021), Australian cricketer
- Henry Joynt (born 1931), English first-class cricketer
- John W. Joynt (1899–1975), American politician
- Maud Joynt (1868–1940), Irish Celtic scholar and linguist
- Rachel Joynt (born 1966), Irish sculptor
- Robert Joynt (1856–1938), Anglican priest and author
- Robert L. Joynt (1845–1931), Canadian merchant and political figure
- Thomas Joynt (1830–1907), New Zealand law barrister
- William Joynt (1889–1986), Australian war-decorated soldier, farmer, printer, publisher and author

== See also ==
- William Lane-Joynt (1824–1895) Irish administrator, Mayor of Limerick (1862) and Lord Mayor of Dublin
- William Russell Lane-Joynt (1855–1921), Irish barrister, philatelist and Olympic shooter
- Michael Scott-Joynt (1943–2014), English bishop and prelate
