= Richard Irvine Best =

Irish scholar (1872-1959)

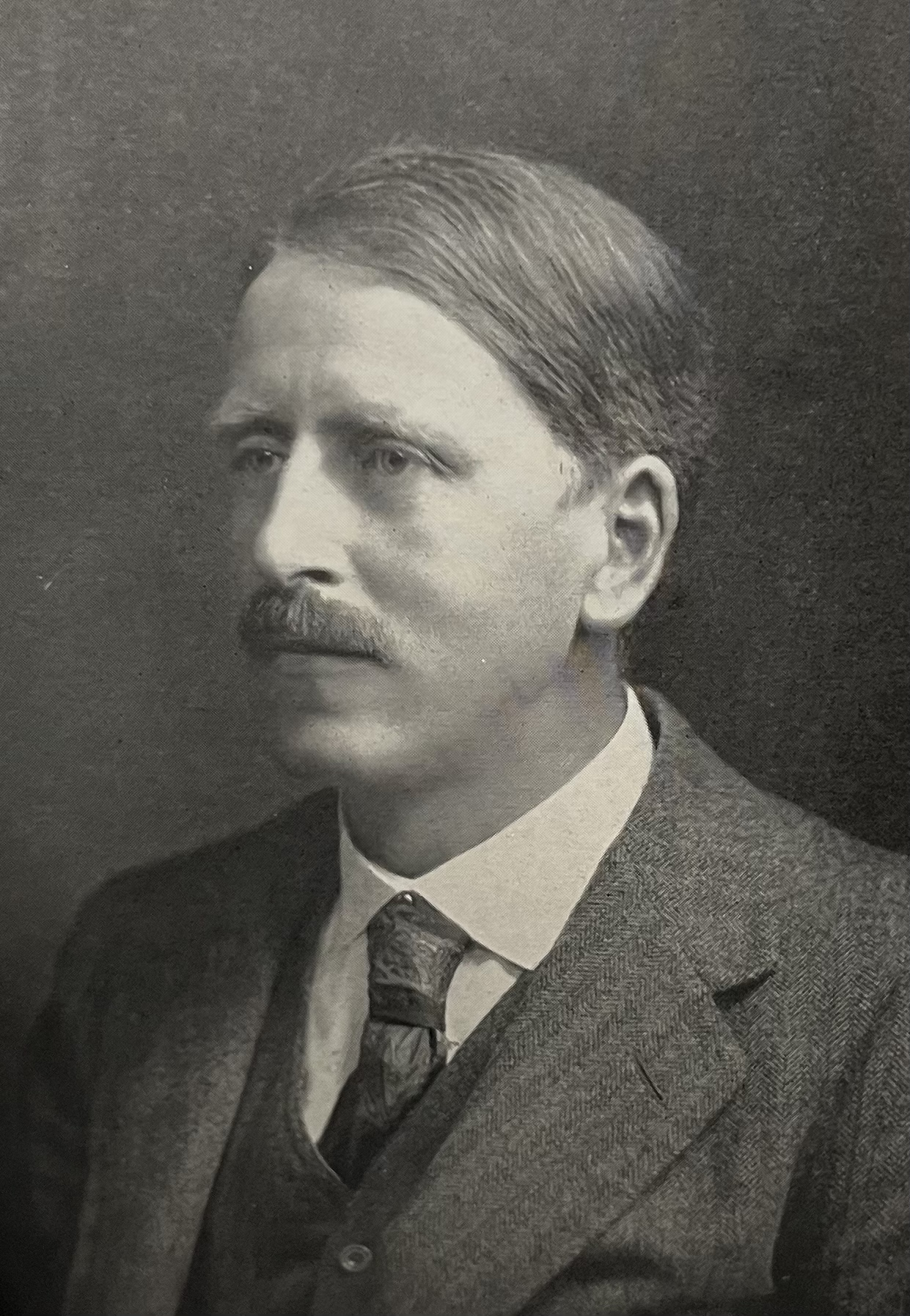
- R. I. Best
- Born: 17 January 1872; Derry, Ireland
- Died: 25 September 1959 (aged 87); Dublin, Ireland
- Occupations: Philologist, Bibliographer, Librarian
- Spouse: Edith Best (1906-1950)
- Writing career
- Subject: Translations
- Notable works: The Irish Mythological Cycle and Celtic Mythology translated (1903); Bibliography of Irish Philology and of Printed Irish Literature (1913); The Martyrology of Tallaght (1931)

Richard Irvine Best (17 January 1872 – 25 September 1959) was born at 3 Bishop Street in Derry, Ireland. He was often known as R. I. Best, or simply Best to his close friends and family. He was an Irish scholar, specifically a philologist and bibliographer, who specialised in Celtic Studies.

== Family ==
Best’s parents were Henry Best and Margaret Jane Best (née Irvine). His father, Henry, was an excise officer working in Paisley, Scotland at the time of Richard’s birth.

Richard Best married his wife, Edith Best (née Oldham) in 1906, Best was seven years her junior. Edith was a younger sister of Charles Hubert Oldham, who would go on to become Professor of Economics at University College Dublin. Edith herself was a musician, a pianist, who had studied at the Royal College of Music in London. The couple had no children, and also claimed to have no affiliation with any religion. Edith died in 1950, and Best on 25 September, nine years later. He died in his home at 57 Upper Leeson Street, Dublin.

== Early life ==
His education took place locally at a grammar school in County Londonderry, called Foyle College, an institution which dates back to 1617, schooling children ages eleven to eighteen. Following on from his time at Foyle College, Best did not attend university, however he was a member of the Irish Literary Society in London. Instead of attending university he worked as a banking assistant for a time before an inheritance allowed him to travel to Paris, France.

It was in Paris that Best met, and became friends with, John Millington Synge, who recommended the lectures of Henri d'Arbois de Jubainville at the Collège de France. Best would later go on to translate and annotate Henri d’Arbois de Jubainville’s work, Le cycle mythologique irlandais et la mythologie celtique into The Irish Mythological Cycle and Celtic Mythology. Best returned to Dublin, where he met Kuno Meyer, who he pushed to establish the School of Irish Learning in 1903, where Best himself was both secretary and student; he was capable of speaking both French and Irish alongside English.

== Career ==
Upon returning from Paris, Best became Honorary Secretary of the School of Irish Learning from the year of its inception in 1903, which was incorporated into the Royal Irish Academy in 1926. He acted as joint editor of the School’s journal Ériu (journal), and continued after the transfer of the journal to the Academy. In 1904 Best joined the staff of the National Library of Ireland as an assistant director. He succeeded as Chief Librarian in 1924, and subsequently Library Director, where he remained in the post until 1940. Throughout his career, Best became a prolific expert on Celtic studies, and has been widely attributed to the survival and success of the subject as it is known today.

=== Achievements ===
His work earned him several accolades. He received the Leibniz Medal of the Royal Prussian Academy in 1914, an honorary D.Litt. by the National University of Ireland in 1920, and an Honorary D.Litt. by Trinity College Dublin in 1923. In 1936 Best was awarded the Medal of the Pontifical Academy of Sciences by Pope Pius XI for his facsimile edition of the Milan codex. He was elected as President of the Royal Irish Academy in 1942. His works, Bibliography of Irish Philology and of Irish Printed Literature (1913) and Bibliography of Irish Philology and Manuscript Literature, 1913-41 (1942), are considered to be some of his most important scholarly outputs.

Best is also known for his appearances in famous works of Irish literature. He appears in James Joyces’ Ulysses, describing him as such, “Mr Best entered, tall, young, mild, light. He bore in his hand with grace a notebook, new, large, clean, bright”. George Moore described him as, “A young man with beautiful shining hair and features so fine and delicate that many a young girl must have dreamed of him at her casement window, and would have loved him if he had not been so passionately interested in the infixed pronoun”, in his memoir Hail and Farewell. Best was drawn by John Butler Yeats, father of William Butler Yeats, and his portrait now hangs in the National Gallery of Ireland.

== Career after retirement ==
Upon his retirement from the National Library, Best became a Senior Professor at the Dublin Institute for Advanced Studies (DIAS). Best retired from the DIAS in 1947 at the age of seventy-five. From 1948 to 1956, he became chairman of the Irish Manuscripts Commission, a position previously held by Eoin MacNeill. While in this role, Best supervised several facsimiles, including RIA MS 23 N 10, later renamed the Book of Ballycummin in 2019. During this time, his wife, Edith, died at their home on 9 March 1950.

== Later life ==
Following his retirement from the Irish Manuscripts Commission, Best spent much of the final three years of his life “sorting out his large correspondence”, much of which is currently held in the National Library. Best also continued to publish new work throughout his later life. He worked on a diplomatic edition of the Book of Leinster alongside Osborn Bergin and Professor M. A. O’Brien, who took over after Bergin’s death in 1950. The first fasciculus was published in 1954, the second in 1956 and the third in 1959. Best’s work also appeared in multiple academic journals, including “Éiriu, and the Zeitschrift für Celtische Philologie, Revue Celtique, Études Celtiques, Hermathena, The Dublin Magazine, The Proceedings of the Royal Irish Academy.” Best also continued with his work in palaeography, including the last paper he completed on the Book of Armagh in 1958, which appeared in Éiriu vol. xviii. E.K.'s obituary for Best also notes “all his anonymous work: transcriptions and investigations undertaken…for other scholars,…friends and colleagues.” His aid in the writing of others is particularly visible in his surviving correspondence with George Moore.

== Death and legacy ==
Best died on 25 September 1959, at his home on 57 Upper Leeson Street in Dublin. The Richard I. Best Papers are currently held at the National Archive and have been instrumental in the foundation of The Richard Irvine Best Memorial lecture. This discussion and celebration of Best’s work, organised by Richard Irvine Best Memorial Lecture Trust, has taken place since 1969.

== Publications ==
- Cuchulain and the men of the Red Branch. New Ireland Review 17 : 299-311 (1902).
- The Irish mythological cycle and Celtic mythology, by H. D’arbois de Jubainville; translated from the French with additional notes by R. I. Best. Dublin, Hodges, Figgis; London, Simpkin, Marshall (1903).
- The Leabhar Oiris [or Book of Chronicles, A.D. 979-1027; edited from MS. 23 E 26, p. 194-207, R.I.A., with variant readings of 23 N 3o, etc., and indices by] R. I. Best. Éiriu 1 : 74-112 (1904).
- The Graves of the Kings at Clonmacnois; [edited from Rawlinson B 512, Bodleian Library, Oxford, with introduction, notes and translation by] R. I. Best. Éiriu 2 : 163-171 (1905)
- The Tragic Death of Curoi Mac Dari; [edited from the Yellow Book of Lecan, col. 776-780 of the MS. (pp. 123a-125a, facsimile ed.) with translation and text from Egerton 88, fol. 10a-11a, by] R. I. Best. Éiriu 2 : 18-35 (1905)
- The Adventures of Art son of conn, and the Courtship of Delbchaem; [edited from the book of Fermoy, pp. 139–145 with introduction, notes and translations, by] R. I. Best. Éiriu 3 : 149-173 (1907).
- The Canonical Hours [edited from H. 3. 17, T.C.D. col. 675 by] R. I. Best. Éiriu 3 : 116 (1907).
- Imram Curaig Maíledúin; [transcribed by R. I. best from the Yellow Book of Lecan, col. 370-399 (facs. pp. 1–15), collated by Kuno Meyer with Harleian 5280, fo. 1 ff.] Anecdota from Irish Manuscripts I : 50-74 (1907).
- Anecdota from Irish Manuscripts; edited by O. J. Bergin, R. I. Best, Kuno Meyer, J. G. O’Keeffe. Halle, Niemeyer; Dublin, Hodges, Figgis, 1907-12. Vols. 1-5.
- Beths Adamnáin from MS. Nr. 4190-4200, fol. 29-33, Bibliothéque Royale, Brussels; [transcribed by R. I. Best] from photographs lent by Prof. Kuno Meyer. Anecdota from Irish Manuscripts 2 : 10-20 (1908).
- Beths Pátraic; [transcribed by R. I. Best] from the vellum MS No. 10 (c. xv cent.) in the King’s Inn Library, Dublin. Anecdota from Irish Manuscripts 2 : 29-42 (1910).
- A Hymn of Praise (H. 1. 11 Trin. Coll., Dublin, fol. 137a) [text and translation by] R. I. Best. Ériu 4 : 120 (1910).
- The Settling of the Manor of Tara; [edited from the Yellow Book of Lecan, col. 740-9, and the Book of Lismore, fol. 90a-92a, with introduction, notes, translation, and indices by] R. I. Best. Ériu 4 : 121-167 (1910).
- Bibliography of the Publications of Whitley Stokes. Zeitschrift für Celtische Philologie 8 : 351-406 (1911).
- Cuchulainn’s Shield (H 3 17, col. 664); [text and notes by] R. I. Best. Éiriu 5 : 72 (1911).
- [Addenda to] A bibliography of the published works of the late Dr. Heinrich Zimmer, 1911.
- Zeitschrift für Celtische Philologie 8 : 593-594 (1912).
- The Lebar Brecc tractate on the canonical hours : [text from p. 247a with variants of 23 N 10, translation and notes, by] R. I. Best. Miscellany presented to Kuno Meyer. Halle, Niemeyer, 1912, pp. 142–166.
- Notes on the script of Lebor na Huidre [with 7 plates]. Éiriu 6 : 161-174 (1912).
- Bibliography of Irish philology and of printed Irish literature [to end of 1912. By R. I. Best]. Dublin, H.M.S.O., 1913. xii, 307 pp. (National Library of Ireland).
- Palaeographical notes I : The Rawlinson B 502 Tigernach : [interpolations of “H”, List of Latin abbreviations]. Éiriu 7 : 114-120 (1913).
- Comhrag Fir Diadh & Chon cCulainn. Táin Bó Cúailinge. [Text ed. From Franciscan MS. 16, Dublin, pp. 83–102 and H. 2. 12 [15] T.C.D., fol. 1 r]. Zeitschrift für Celtische Philologie 10 : 274-308 (1914).
- Éiriu : the journal of the School of Irish Learning, Dublin. Vol. 7, edited by Kuno Meyer & R. I. Best, 1914.
- The St. Gall Incantation against Headache; [edited from H. 3. 17, col. 658d marg. inf., T.C.D. with notes and translations by] R. I. Best. Éiriu 8 : 100 (1915).
- The Battle of Airtech [edited from the Book of Lecan, fol. 169v (p. 342a), R.I.A. and H. 3. 18, p. 724 ff., T.C.D., with introduction, translation and notes, by] R. I. Best. Éiriu 8 : 170-190 (1916).
- Comhrag Fir Diadh & Chon cCulainn. Táin Bó Cúailinge. Berichtingungen und Nachträge zu Band 10, Z. f. celt. Philol. Zeitschrift für Celtische Philologie 11 : 166 (1916).
- Palaeographical notes, II : Lebor na hUidre. Éiriu 8 : 117-119 (1916).
- Prognostications from the Raven and the Wren; [edited from H. 3.17, col. 803 f and col. 831, T.C.D., with introduction, translation and notes, by] R. I. Best. Éiriu 8 : 120-126 (1916).
- The ancient list of the coarbs of Patrick (LL f. 21v. Facs. 42), by H. J. Lawlor and R. I. Best. Royal Irish Academy Proceedings C 35 :316-362 (1919).
- Distinguished Irishmen. Fletcher, George, editor. Ireland [volume of essays, including Distinguished Irishmen, by R. I. Best]. Cambridge University Press, 1922, pp. 251–285.
- Kuno Meyer. Éiriu 9 : 181-186 (1923).
- Bibliography of the publications of Kuno Meyer. Zeitschrift für Celtische Philologie 15 : 1-65 (1924).
- On the Subscriptiones in the “Book of Dimma” [with 3 plates]. Hermathena 20 : 84-100 (1926).
- The birth of Brandub, son of Eochaid and of Aedán, son of Gabrán; [edited with translation from the Yellow Book of Lecan128a, by] R. I. Best. Medieval studies in memory of Gertrude Schoepperle Loomis. New York, Columbia University Press; Paris, Champion, 1927, pp. 381–90.
- An early monastic grant in the Book of Durrow; [edited with introduction, translation, notes and collotype facsimile, by] R. I. Best. Éiriu 10 : 389-402 (1928).
- Notes on Rawlinson B 512. Zeitschrift für Celtische Philologie 17 : 389-402 (1928).
- Lebor na Huidre : Book of the Dun Cow; edited by R. I. Best and O. J. Bergin. Dublin, published for the R.I.A. [by] Hodges, Figgis, 1929, xliv, 340 pp. 2 plates.
- Amairgen son of Ecet Salach. From Book of Leinster, fol. 75 b g (Facs. p. 117) [text, by] R. I. Best. Irish texts I : 32-33 (1931).
- The Martyrology of Tallaght. From the Book of Leinster and MS. 5100-4 in the Royal Library, Brussels; edited with introduction, translation, notes and indices by R. I. Best and H. J. Lawlor. London, 1931, xxviii, 262 pp. (Henry Bradshaw Society, 68).
- Charles Plummer, 24 Jan. 1851 to 8 Sept. 1927, by P. Allen, R. M. S. Stenton and R. I. Best [with bibliography]. British Academy Proceedings 15 : 463-476 (1931).
- The Oldest fragments of the Senchas Mār. From MS. H. 2. 15 in the Library of Trinity College. With descriptive introduction by R. I. Best and Rudolf Thurneysen. Dublin, published for the Commission by the Stationery Office of Saorstát Eireann, 1931. xv pp., 56 plates. (Comisiún Laimhscríbhinní nah Eireann : the Irish Manuscripts Commission. Facsimiles in collotype of Irish manuscripts, I).
- Story of Máel Ruain of Tamlacht. From Book of Leinster, fol. 205a 39 (Facs. p. 286) [text by] R. I. Best. Irish Texts I : 32-35 (1931).
- Annals of Inisfallen, reproduced in facsimile from the original manuscript (Rawlinson B 503) in the Bodleian Library, with a descriptive introduction by R. I. Best and Eoin MacNeill. Dublin, Royal Irish Academy, etc., 1933. viii, 30 pp., 56 plates.
- The Commentary on the psalms with glosses in Old Irish preserved in the Ambrosian Library (MS. C 301 inf.) : collotype facsimile, with introduction by R. I. Best. Dublin, Royal Irish Academy, 1936. viii, 39 pp. Plates 1-146, I-X, 1-2.
- Tochmarc Étaíne; [edited from Yellow Book of Lecan, col. 985 (Nat. Libr. Ir. 4 : Phillips 8214) and Yellow Book of Lecan (T.C.D.) col. 876, [with introduction notes, translation and indices by] Osborn Bergin and R. I. Best. Éiriu 12: 137-196 (1938).
- An Irish version of the Somniale Danielis; [edited from H. 3. 17, col. 650 (T.C.D.) with Latin version from various sources by] R. I. Best. Féil-Sgríbhinn Eoin Mhic Néill, Dublin, At the Sign of the Three Candles, 1940, pp. 3–17.
- Edward John Gwynn [with list of publications]. Royal Irish Academy, Minutes of Proceedings, Session 1940-41, pp. 5–10 (1941).
- The oldest fragments of the Senchas Mār (MS. H. 2. 15, Trin. Coll.) Addenda & corrigenda. Analecta Hibernica 10 : 299-300 (1941).
- Bibliography of Irish philology and manuscript literature : publications, 1913-1941, by R. I. Best. Dublin, Institute for Advanced Studies, 1942, x, 254 pp.
- Royal Irish Academy. Quaternion Centenary Celebrations. Opening remarks by President R. I. Best. Royal Irish Academy Proceedings B 50 : 59-70.
- On recent Irish studies in the Academy : an address delivered to the Academy, February 25, 1946, by R. I. Best, President. Royal Irish Academy Proceedings C 51 : 34 (1946).
- The Yellow Book of Lecan. Journal of Celtic Studies I : 190-192 (1950).
- Whitley Stokes (1830-1909) : a memorial discourse. Dublin, Dublin University Press, 1951. [Private circulation.]
- Pii Antistitis Icon; or, The Life of Francis Kirwan, Bishop of Killala, by John Lynch, Archdeacon of Tuam (1659), reproduced at the Ordnance Survey, Dublin; [foreword by R. I. Best]. Dublin, Stationery Office, 1951. (Comisiún Láimhscríbhinní nah Eireann. Collotype facsimiles.)
- Some Irish charms; [edited from Trinity College MS. H. 3. 17 (1336), with introduction, notes and translation, by] R. I. Best. Éiriu 16 : 27-32 (1952).
- Lebor na Huidre : Book of the Dun Cow; edited by R. I. Best and O. J. Bergin. Reprint with additional corrigenda. Dublin, R.I.A., 1953. Xiv, 341 pp., 2 plates.
- Royal Irish Academy. MS 23 N 10. [facsimile of] MS 23 N 10 (formerly Betham 145) in the Library of the Royal Irish Academy, with descriptive introduction by R. I. Best. Dublin, Stationery Office, 1954. xxiii, 160 pp. (Coimisiún Laimhscríbhinní na hEireann. Facsimiles in collotype of Irish manuscripts, 6).
- The Book of Leinster, formerly Leabhar na Núachongbála; edited by R. I. Best, Osborn Bergin and M. A. O’Brien. Dublin, Dublin Institute for Advances Studies, 1954-57. Vols. 1-3.
- Bodleian MS Laud 610 [with two plates]. Celtica 3 : 338 (1956).
- Palaeographical notes, III : the Book of Armagh. Éiriu 18 : 102-8 (1958). With 4 plates.
