= Deichtine =

In Irish mythology, Deichtine or Deichtire was the sister of Conchobar mac Nessa and the mother of Cú Chulainn. Her husband was Sualtam, but Cú Chulainn's real father may have been Lugh of the Tuatha Dé Danann.

In one version of the story she was Conchobar's charioteer. When a flock of birds descended on Emain Macha and ate all the grass, the Ulstermen decided to hunt them, and they set off after them in their chariots. They chased them until night fell, and it began to snow, so they decided to seek shelter. They found a house and were welcomed in by the young man who lived there. His wife was in labour at the time, but he showed them hospitality and served them food and drink. His wife gave birth to a baby boy, and at the same time a horse outside the house gave birth to two colts. The Ulstermen went to sleep, but when they woke up they found themselves at the Brug na Bóinne (Newgrange). The house, the man and his wife had vanished, but the baby and the two colts remained. Deichtine took the boy as her foster-son and they returned to Emain.

Soon after the boy fell ill and died. Deichtine took a drink, and a tiny creature leaped from the cup into her mouth. When she fell asleep, Lug appeared to her and told her it was his house they had stayed in that night, and that his child was in her womb. While the Ulstermen whispered that it was actually Conchobar's son, the latter betrothed Deichtine to Sualtam mac Roich, who owed him a great favor. Deichtine married Sualtam, and on her wedding night, ashamed to carry another's child, "crushed the child within her until she was again like a virgin. Then she slept with her husband and was made pregnant by him and bore a son".

In another version, Deichtine disappeared from Emain Macha. As before, a flock of birds came to Emain and led the Ulstermen to Lug's house, but the wife in labour was Deichtine. They woke up at the Brug na Bóinne, Lug and the house had vanished, but Deichtine and the baby remained. They returned to Emain and Deichtine married Sualtam.

== Genealogy ==
Deichtine's ancestry and kin: Deichtine's mother was Maga, daughter of Oengus Og, and her father was Cathbad the Druid. Her sisters were Finchoem, mother of Conall the Victorious, and the mother of Naiose and his brothers. Although Conall the Victorious was a bitter enemy of Anluan and Cet mac Maga, they were his maternal uncles. Cet even protected the pregnant Finchoem until she gave birth and it was prophesied that Conall would be his slayer.

== Primary sources ==
- Compert Con Culainn (Recension I), ed. A.G. van Hamel (1933). Compert Con Culainn and Other Stories. Mediaeval and Modern Irish Series 3. Dublin: DIAS. pp. 1–8.
- Compert Con Culainn (Recension II), ed. Kuno Meyer (1905). "Mitteilungen aus irischen Handschriften: Feis Tige Becfoltaig". Zeitschrift für celtische Philologie. 5: 500–4 (from D IV 2).; ed. Ernst Windisch (1880). Irische Texte mit Wörterbuch. Vol. 1. Leipzig: Von S. Hirzel. pp. 143–5 and 140–2 (from Egerton 1782).
