= Eleanor Knott =

Irish scholar, academic and lexicographer

Eleanor Knott MRIA
- Born: Philippa Marie Eleanor Knott; 18 November 1886; Dublin, Ireland
- Died: 4 January 1975 (aged 88); Dublin, Ireland
- Occupations: Irish scholar, academic and lexicographer

Eleanor Marie Knott MRIA (born Philippa Marie Eleanor Knott; 18 November 1886 – 4 January 1975) was an Irish scholar, academic and lexicographer, as well as one of the first women elected to the Royal Irish Academy.

== Early life and education ==
Knott was born to John Freeman Knott, a physician, and Philippa Annie (née Balcombe) in Sallymount Terrace, Ranelagh, Dublin. Knott had one sibling. Her father was from Kingsland, County Roscommon. Her mother was born in Hull, England, but was Cornish and lived in Ireland. She encouraged her daughter to study modern Irish. Knott got her basic education in Abercorn College, Harcourt Street. After that she went on to study older Irish at the School of Irish Learning in Dublin where she studied under Richard Irvine Best. Knott worked for the school in the administration section until she won a scholarship in 1907 which allowed her to continue studying.

In 1911, she joined the Dictionary of the Irish Language for the Royal Irish Academy working with Carl Marstrander and remained involved in that for most of the rest of her working life. She was also involved with the Society for the Simplification of the Spelling of Irish.

However she also managed to achieve an academic career in Trinity College Dublin when she was appointed lecturer in Celtic languages in 1928. Her master's was completed in 1932; her doctorate in 1938 and a special chair created when she became the Professor of early Irish there in 1939. As an academic Knott contributed to journals and was joint editor of Éiru but also using the names EK, PMEK and Finnéigeas, she wrote articles for Sinn Féin and The Irish Peasant as a nationalist. She also produced translations of old Irish poetry. Following the removal of the ban on women being members of the Royal Irish Academy, Knott was elected in 1949 and was a member until 1955. She was a major correspondent and kept her letters so that now there is a sizable collection of information through them kept in the Eleanor Knott Collection at the RIA.

In her last years, she went blind and moved to the Molyneux Home for the Blind where she died in 1975. She was buried in Mount Jerome cemetery.

== Bibliography ==
- Editor, The bardic poems of Tadhg Dall Ó Huiginn (1550-1591), Part 1 (London, 1922).
- Editor, The bardic poems of Tadhg Dall Ó Huiginn (1550-1591), Part 2 (London, 1926).
- An introduction to Irish syllabic poetry of the period 1200-1600 with selections, notes and glossary (Cork, 1928).
- Editor, Togail Bruidne da Derga (Dublin, 1936).
- Irish classical poetry commonly called bardic poetry (Dublin, 1957).
- ‘Address to David O'Keeffe’ in Ériu 4 (1910), 209-232.
- ‘The Deaths of Aodh MacGaraidh and Flann MacDuibh Dithraibh’ in Galway Archaeological Journal 7 (1911), 54-63.
- ‘Filidh Éireann go haointeach’ in Ériu 5 (1911), 50-69.
- ‘The Deaths of Aodhh Mac Garaidh and Flann Mac Duibh Dithraibh’ in Journal of the Galway Archaeological & Archaeological Society 7 (1911), 54-63
- ‘A Poem by Giolla Brighde Ó Heóghusa’ in Miscellany Kuno Meyer (1912), 241-245.
- ‘Bó thúir’ in Ériu 7 (1914), 1-26.
- ‘On a line in St Patrick's Hymn’ in Ériu 7 (1914), 239
- ‘The flight of the Earls, 1607’ in Ériu 8 (1916), 191-194.
- ‘Why Mongán was deprived of noble issue’ in Ériu 8 (1916), 155-160.
- ‘Ernst Windisch 1844-1918’ in Studies: An Irish Quarterly Review (1919), 264-267.
- ‘Irish notes’ in Hermathena 22 (1932), 272-274.
- ‘Maud Joynt (24th. July 1940)’ in Éigse 2 (1940), 226-229.
- ‘Varia II: 1. Colomain na Temra, 2. in duus’ in Ériu 14 (1943), 144-146.
- ‘O'Clery's Glossary and its forerunners: a note on glossary-making in Medieval language’ in Measgra Mhichil Ui Chleirigh (1944), 65-69.
- Editor, ‘An Irish seventeenth-century translation of the Rule of St Clare’ in Ériu 15 (1948), 1-187.
- ‘An Irish seventeenth-century translation of the Rule of St Clare’ in Ériu 15 (1948), 187.
- ‘An index to the proper names in Saltair na Rann’ in Ériu 16 (1952), 99-122.
- ‘Osborn Bergin, 1873-1950’ in Ériu 16 (1952), 1-3.
- ‘Thomas Francis O’Rahilly’ in Ériu 17 (1955)
- ‘Obituary Eamonn Ó Tuathail’ in Éigse 8 (1956), 263-267.
- ‘A Poem of prophecies [from the Book of Hy Many]’ in Ériu 18 (1958), 55-84.
- ‘Mac An Bhaird's elegy on the Ulster lords’ in Celtica 5 (1960), 161-171.
- ‘Richard Irvine Best’ in Ériu 19 (1962), 123-125.
- ‘Foclóir’ in Ériu 19 (1962), 1-122.
- Marstrander, Carl and Quin, E. G., editors, Dictionary of the Irish language, based mainly on old and middle Irish materials (Dublin, 1913-1976). Major contributor to this publication.
- Editor, Ó Laoghaire, Peadar, Táin Bó Cuailnge 'na dhráma (Dublin, 1915).
- Editor, Ó Laoghaire, Peadar, Lughaidh Mac Con (Dublin, 1914).
