= Robin Flower =

English poet and scholar

- Born: 16 October 1881; Meanwood, Yorkshire, England
- Died: 16 January 1946 (aged 64)
- Occupations: British writer and scholar

Robin Ernest William Flower (16 October 1881 – 16 January 1946) was an English poet and scholar, a Celticist, Anglo-Saxonist and translator from the Irish language. He is commonly known in Ireland as "Bláithín" (Little Flower).

== Life ==
He was born at Meanwood in Yorkshire, and educated at Leeds Grammar School. His parents, Marmaduke and Jane, were from families with Irish ancestry. He was awarded a scholarship to study classics at Pembroke College, Oxford and graduated with first-class honours in 1904, before obtaining work as an assistant in the British Museum in 1906. It was during his early years at the museum that he began learning Irish, with the museum authorities supporting his study of the language in Ireland. He married Ida Mary Streeter in 1911.

He worked from 1929 as Deputy Keeper of Manuscripts in the British Museum and, completing the work of Standish Hayes O'Grady, compiled a catalogue of the Irish manuscripts there.

He wrote several collections of poetry, translations of the Irish poets for the Cuala Press, and verses on Blasket Island. He first visited Blasket in 1910, at the recommendation of Carl Marstrander, his teacher at the School of Irish Learning in Dublin; he acquired there the Irish nickname Bláithín. He suggested a Norse origin for the name "Blasket". Under Flower's influence, George Derwent Thomson and Kenneth Hurlstone Jackson made scholarly visits to Blasket.

After his death his ashes were scattered on the Blasket Islands.

== Works ==
As a scholar of Anglo-Saxon, he wrote on the Exeter Book He identified interpolations in the Old English Bede, by Laurence Nowell. His work on Nowell included the discovery in 1934, in Nowell's transcription, of the poem Seasons for Fasting.

He translated from the writings of Tomás Ó Criomhthain, his Irish language teacher on the Blasket Islands, and wrote a memoir, The Western Island; Or, the Great Blasket (1944), illustrated by his wife Ida. The essay collection The Irish Tradition (1947) is often cited, and was reprinted in 1994; it includes "Ireland and Medieval Europe", his John Rhŷs Memorial Lecture from 1927.
