= Carl Marstrander =

Norwegian linguist

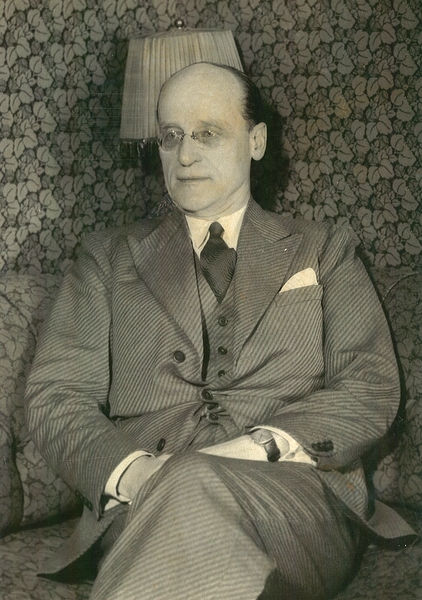
Carl Marstrander, c. 1933

Carl Johan Sverdrup Marstrander (26 November 1883 – 23 December 1965) was a Norwegian linguist, known for his work on the Irish language. His works, largely written in Norwegian, on the Celtic and Norse components in Norwegian culture, are considered important for modern Norway.

== Life ==
He was a student of Sophus Bugge and Alf Torp, and spent time in Ireland from 1907, studying the Corca Dhuibhne dialect of Munster Irish on Great Blasket Island with Peig Sayers and Tomás Ó Criomhthain, and then teaching at the School of Irish Learning in 1910. He jointly edited Ériu volumes 5–6 (1911–12) with Kuno Meyer. From 1913 to 1954 he was Professor in Celtic languages at the University of Oslo. During the German occupation of Norway he was jailed several times, and once came close to execution after an arrest by the Gestapo. He influenced later linguists, including Alf Sommerfelt and Carl H. J. Borgstrøm.

== Scholarly work ==
He was general editor from 1910 to 1914 for the long-projected historical Dictionary of the Irish Language, the first fascicle of which was published by the Royal Irish Academy in 1913. His articles were of enduring influence, and published in Revue Celtique and Zeitschrift für Celtische Philologie, and his own journal, Norsk Tidsskrift for Sprogvidenskap which he founded in 1928.

His Bidrag til det Norske Sprogs historie i Irland (1915) and Les présents indo-européens à nasale infixée en celtique (1924), are two of his larger works.

He is also known for his writings on the history of the Isle of Man, and for securing support and recognition for the Manx historian John Kneen. He made pioneering sound recordings of the Manx language, at a time when few fluent native speakers survived.

He theorised a North Italian or Etruscan origin for the runes. This was, however, partly based on an artefact known now to have been faked.

== Notes ==
Bibliography

- Binchy, D. A. (1966), "Carl J. S. Marstrander", Ériu, 20: 237–8, JSTOR 30008068
