= Joseph Vendryes =

French linguist (1875–1960)

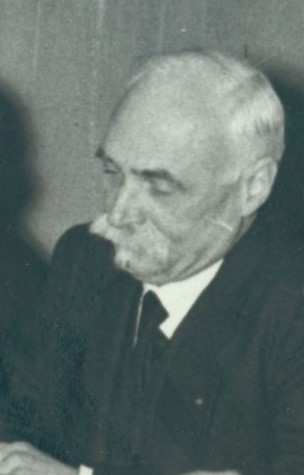
- Born: 13 January 1875; Paris, French Third Republic
- Died: 30 January 1960 (aged 85); Paris, France
- Education: University of Paris
- Known for: Work in Celtic linguistics; Vendryes's law
- Scientific career
- Fields: Linguistics
- Workplaces: École Pratique des Hautes Études

Joseph Vendryes or Vendryès (French: [vɑ̃dʁiɛs]; 13 January 1875 – 30 January 1960) was a French Celticist. After studying with Antoine Meillet, he was chairman of Celtic languages and literature at the École Pratique des Hautes Études. He founded the journal Études Celtiques. He was a member of the Académie des Inscriptions et Belles-Lettres and a consultant with the International Auxiliary Language Association, which standardized and presented Interlingua.

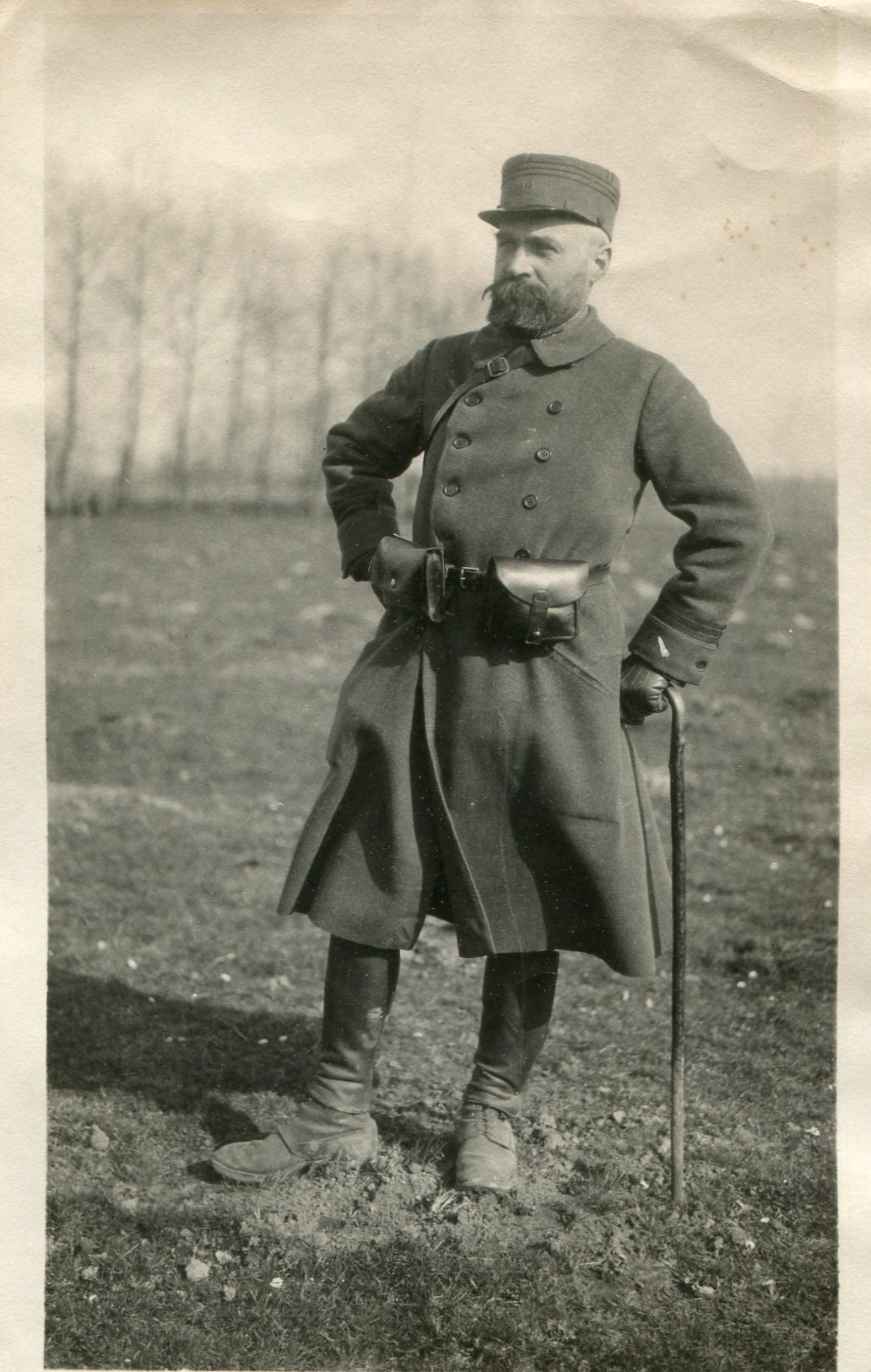
Joseph Vendryes in April 1915.

== Biography ==
Joseph Jean Baptiste Marie Vendryès was born on 13 January 1875 in Paris (9th arrondissement). His father, Albert Jean Baptiste Eugène Vendryès, worked for the Ministry of Public Instruction, and his grandfather, Jean-Baptiste Vendryès, was an alumnus of the École normale supérieure and served as a school inspector in Caen and Melun.

Vendryès studied at the pensionnat des Oblats de Saint-François de Sales and the École Sainte-Anne in Saint-Ouen (1883–1889), then as an external student at the Lycée Louis-le-Grand. He earned a baccalauréat ès lettres in 1891, a licence ès lettres in 1894, and became agrégé in grammar in 1896. He held several research fellowships, including study grants in Germany (1898–1899) and at the École pratique des hautes études (1897–1900). He earned his doctorat ès lettres in May 1902.

Vendryès began his academic career in 1901 as chargé d’une suppléance at the École pratique des hautes études (EPHE). He subsequently held positions as chargé de cours in Greek at the Faculté des lettres de Clermont-Ferrand (1902), professeur adjoint of Greek language and literature (1905), and chargé de cours of Greek literature and institutions at the Faculté des lettres de Caen (1906). He became professeur titulaire in 1907. In 1914 he was appointed chargé de cours in comparative grammar and Indo-European languages at the Faculté des lettres de Paris, and later held positions as professeur adjoint (1919), professeur sans chaire (1921), and professor of linguistics (from April 1923). He also taught general linguistics at the École normale supérieure (1920–1936).

Vendryès held administrative roles including assessor to the dean of the Faculty of Letters of Paris (from July 1928) and dean of the Faculty (from December 1937). He was suspended on 1 April 1944 and reinstated on 20 August 1944. He retired on 31 December 1944 and was named honorary dean on 19 April 1945.

In addition to his university roles, Vendryès served as directeur d’études at the EPHE (Celtic languages and literatures) from 7 December 1925. He was a member of the University Council from 1927 and served in the military from 1914 to 1919, rising from lieutenant of the territorial army to captain in 1915 and serving in the general staff.

=== Personal life and death ===
Vendryès received several honours: he was made Commander of the Légion d’honneur (1939), elected to the Académie des inscriptions et belles-lettres (1931), served as its vice-president in 1938, and received the Prix Osiris in 1952. He held honorary doctorates from the National University of Ireland (1925), Trinity College Dublin (1932), the University of Wales (1937), and was a member of multiple international academies, including those of Oslo (1932), Copenhagen (1933), Dublin (1934), Prague (1936), and Amsterdam (1939).

On 3 July 1906 he married Germaine Marie Félicie Prévost in Lyon, with whom he had three children: Suzanne (1907), Pierre (1908), and Georges (1920).

He died in Paris on 30 January 1960.

== Published works ==
- Recherches sur l'histoire et les effets de l'intensité initiale en latin ('Research on the History and the Effects of Initial Intensity in Latin', 1902)
- Traité d'accentuation grecque ('A Treatise on Greek Accentuation', 1904)
- Grammaire du vieil-irlandais ('A Grammar of Old Irish', 1908)
- Le langage ('Language', 1921)
- La position linguistique du celtique ('The Linguistic Position of Celtic', 1930)
- La Religion des Celtes ('The Religion of the Celts', 1948)
- Choix d'études linguistiques et celtiques ('Selections of Linguistic and Celtic Studies', 1952)
- Lexique étymologique de l'irlandais ancien ('An Etymological Lexicon of Old Irish', 1959)

== See also ==
- Leo Weisgerber
- Jan de Vries
