= Raimund Karl =

Austrian archaeologist

- Born: September 15, 1969 (age 57); Vienna, Austria
- Occupations: Archaeologist, Celticist, historian, educator

Academic background
- Education: University of Vienna
- Thesis: Altkeltisch ("Old Celtic") Social Structures (2006)

Academic work
- Discipline: Archaeologist
- Institutions: University of Wales (2001-2008); Bangor University (since 2007)

Raimund Karl (born September 15, 1969 in Vienna) is an Austrian archaeologist, Celticist and historian. He is currently a professor of Archaeology and Heritage Management Institute and at the School of History, Welsh History and Archaeology at Bangor University.

== Life ==
Between 1987 and 1995 Karl studied Prehistory and Early History, and a combination of subjects on Celtic studies at the University of Vienna. He attended additional courses in Egyptology, Ethnology, Classical Archaeology, Ancient history, numismatics and linguistics. This study was followed by a doctorate in prehistory and early history, in which he graduated in 2003. His habilitation process took place in 2005-2006, his habilitation thesis appeared in 2006 under the title Altkeltisch ("Old Celtic") Social Structures. With over one hundred professional publications, including many large and basic ones, he is one of the best known of the prehistorians from Austria and Central and Western Europe.

In October 2001 he worked as an AHRB (now: AHRC) Research Fellow at the University of Wales Centre for Advanced Welsh and Celtic Studies, where he was on the Project 5 - Celtic identity project, among others, creating an Atlas for Celtic Studies and cooperated on the Encyclopedia Celtic Culture - A Historical Encyclopedia. He also taught in 2002 at the Centre for Continuing Education of the University of Wales, Aberystwyth Archaeology. From January 2003 he joined Aberystwyth as Lecturer in Archaeology and Heritage at the University of Wales, Bangor. In 2006 he became its Senior Lecturer, 2008 promoted to Professor of Archaeology and Heritage. Since 2007 he is also Head of School of History, Welsh History and Archaeology at Bangor University.

Since 2004 he is a member of the Institute of Field Archaeologists and a Fellow of the Society of Antiquaries of Scotland. In 2005 he became a member of the Board of Celtic Studies, where he remained until its dissolution in 2007. Since 2007 he is the representative for prehistoric archeology in the successor organization of the Board of Celtic Studies, the "Publications and Collaborative Research Committee" of the Centre for Advanced Welsh and Celtic Studies. Also in 2007 he was elected a Fellow of the Society of Antiquaries of London.

Professor Raimund Karl was formerly a Research Fellow at the University of Wales Centre for Advanced Welsh & Celtic Studies Ancient Britain and the Atlantic Zone Project (Ireland, Armorica, and the Iberian Peninsula). His research interests and publications, while there, dealt with the Iron Age in Wales and Austria, Celtic social structure, and the Celtosceptic controversy. His contribution to the Celtic from the West book edited by Barry Cunliffe and John T. Koch was a more practical and useful cooperative definition of the Celts based on the contemporary inclusive and associative paradigm rather than just essentially on language which is the traditional paradigm. In this chapter he also outlined a model for development of Celtic culture that doesn't depend on any one particular site of origin but rather an association of cultural traits of disparate origins that leads to the culture propagated so widely over Europe in ancient times.

Together with his Austrian countryman David Stifter, professor for Old Irish at the University of Maynooth, Ireland, Karl is one of the international figureheads of Celtology.

== Research priorities ==
- Archaeology of the European Late Bronze Age, Iron Age and the northwest European early Middle Ages
- Archaeological Theory
- Celtic Archaeology
- Social history of the ancient Celts
- Celtic Legal History
- Monuments and cultural heritage protection
- Museology
- Labor market in archeology
- Discovering the archaeologists of Austria ( https://discovering-archaeologists.eu/ )
- Security and safety in the archaeological fieldwork

== Works ==
- Introduction to Cultural Studies Celtic Studies. PDF file (7 MB, 239 pages)
- Altkeltische social structures, Budapest, Archaeolingua 2006, ISBN 963-8046-69-4
- founder with David Stifter (joint authors and editors.), Celtic Worlds, (4 vol), London, Routledge 2007, ISBN 978-0-415-35711-1 and ISBN 0-415-35715-2
- collaborator with John T. Koch on:An Atlas for Celtic Studies: Archaeology and Names in Ancient Europe and Early Medieval Ireland, Britain, and Brittany(Oxford: Oxbow: 2007)
- wrote Chapter 2 of Celtic from the West edited by Barry Cunliffe and John T. Koch: The Celts from everywhere and nowhere: a re-evaluation of the origins of the Celts and the emergence of Celtic cultures.
