= Exequiel Monge Allen =

Chilean historian and Celtic studies scholar

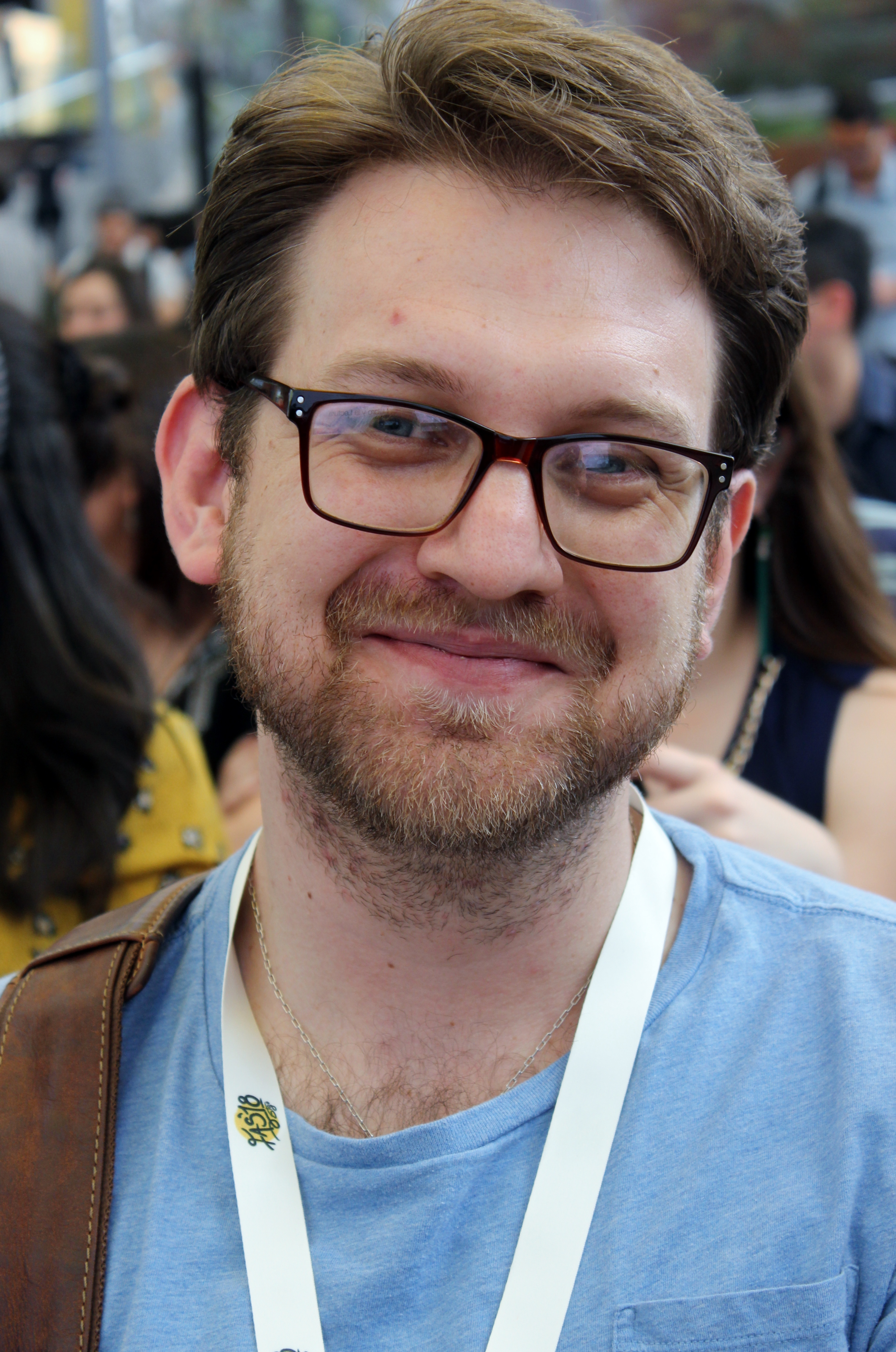
- Allen in 2018
- Born: Exequiel Leopoldo Arturo Monge Allen; November 16, 1987; Providencia, Chile
- Partner: Rodrigo Opazo Iturriaga
- Parent(s): Miguel Ignacio Monge Sánchez, Maria Lillian Allen Gorichon

Academic background
- Education: Pontifical Catholic University of Chile (Licence in History); Alberto Hurtado University (teacher's certification); University of Galway (Master of Arts and PhD)
- Thesis: Beati immaculati in via: Sin and Reconciliation among the céli Dé of Tallaght and Terryglass (2022)
- Doctoral advisor: Máirín Ní Dhonnchadha

Academic work
- Discipline: History
- Sub-discipline: Celtic Studies
- Institutions: Metropolitan University of Educational Sciences; Finis Terrae University
- Main interests: Celtic Studies, queer theology

Exequiel Monge Allen (born 16 November 1987), who writes fiction under the pen name Joseph Michael Brennan, is a Chilean historian and Celtic studies scholar who works on the religious history of early medieval Ireland. He is a lecturer in the Department of History at the Metropolitan University of Educational Sciences and the Finis Terrae University in Santiago and director of the Centro de Estudios Célticos, Anglosajones y Nórdicos (Centre for Celtic, Anglo-Saxon and Norse Studies). As a novelist he is the author of the fantasy trilogy Las memorias del Juramento.

== Biography ==
Monge Allen was born at Providencia, Santiago, son of Miguel Ignacio Monge Sánchez and Maria Lillian Allen Gorichon. Before he could write, he drew stories inspired by his Playmobil and Lego play, and sometimes his mother wrote down what he dictated. He read The Hobbit at seven and The Lord of the Rings at eight, and began a first novel that he describes as a well-meaning imitation and never finished. He has said he was a very early member of the Chilean Tolkien society, and that he read George R. R. Martin's novels after watching the first season of Game of Thrones.

He earned a licentiate in History from the Pontificia Universidad Católica de Chile (2010) and a licentiate in Education, with teaching qualification in History, Geography and Social Sciences, from the Universidad Alberto Hurtado (2012). At the University of Galway he took an MA in Old and Middle Irish Language and Literature (2014) and a PhD in Celtic Studies (2022). His research covers early Irish monasticism, pastoral care, penance, anmchara and the figure of John the Evangelist in medieval Ireland.

== Works ==
=== Fictional works ===
- Las cenizas del Juramento. Montena. 2016.
- El príncipe de los Cuatro Vientos. Penguin Random House. 2016.
- La sangre de los Dioses. Penguin Random House. 2018.
