= Breandán Ó Madagáin =

Irish scholar (1932–2020)

- Born: 1932; Limerick, Ireland
- Died: 9 January 2020 (aged 87–88); Dublin, Ireland
- Occupation: Writer
- Years active: 1955–2020

Breandán Ó Madagáin (1932 – 9 January 2020) was an Irish scholar, writer and celticist. He was Professor Emeritus and past Chair of Department of Irish, University College Galway, a member of the Royal Irish Academy, and was Chairman, 1995–2005, of the Board of Celtic Studies in the Dublin Institute for Advanced Studies.

Breandán Ó Madagáin was born in Limerick. His main contributions to Irish scholarship related to the history of sean-nós singing. He inaugurated courses in the history of Irish song at University College Galway, unique in their kind. He is well known for the thesis that the bulk of Irish Bardic Poetry was sung, and that many of the original melodies have been passed down through the oral tradition, although not always with their original lyrics.

== Bibliography ==
- Caointe Agus Seancheolta Eile, or Keening and other Old Irish Musics, Cló Iar-Chonnachta, Indreabhan, Ireland, 2005
- An Ghaeilge i Luimneach 1700-1800
- Functions of Irish Folk Song in the Nineteenth Century in: Béaloideas 1985. Galway: University College Galway. 130-216
- "Irish Vocal Music of Lament and Syllabic Verse"
- "Echoes of Magic in the Gaelic Song Tradition"
- Languages and Celtic Peoples (Nova Scotia, Canada: St. Mary's University, 1992)
