= Seasons for Fasting =

Incomplete Old English poem

The title "(The) Seasons for Fasting" refers to an incomplete Old English homiletic poem, that which deals primarily with the observance of fasts on the appropriate dates of the liturgical calendar, but which also attacks the misbehaviour of lax priests. The piece appears to have been composed by a clergyman and directed at a lay audience, addressed as folces manna in line 212, whom he perhaps believed to have been potentially misguided.

== Witnesses ==
The original manuscript, MS Otho B XI, was largely destroyed in the Cotton fire of 1731 and "Seasons for Fasting" was among the losses. The antiquarian Laurence Nowell had made a transcript in 1562, which was recovered by Robin Flower in 1934 and which is now contained in MS Add. 43703 (London, British Library). Moreover, eight lines of the poem were transcribed by Abraham Whelock. Nowell's transcript has the poem on ff. 257-60v, where it breaks off suddenly, and continues on ff. 261r-64v with Old English remedies and leechdoms and on f. 265–67 with a further transcription of the Laws of Æthelstan. When Humfrey Wanley inspected the manuscript in 1705 for his catalogue, the poem had become the last item.

== Editions ==
- Dobbie, Elliott Van Kirk (ed.) (1942) The Anglo-Saxon Minor Poems. (The Anglo-Saxon Poetic Records; 6.) New York: Columbia U. P.; pp. 98–104.
- Foys, Martin, et al. (eds.) (2019-) Old English Poetry in Facsimile Project (with digital facsimile images, annotations and modern English translation) University of Wisconsin-Madison; https://oepoetryfacsimile.org/?document=14186&document=14191

== Scholarship ==
- "Seasons for Fasting"
  - Text available online
- Flower, Robin (1934) "Laurence Nowell and a Recovered Anglo-Saxon Poem" in: British Museum Quarterly; 8 (1934); pp. 130–32.
- Grant, R. J. S. (1972) "A Note on The Seasons for Fasting" in: The Review of English Studies; 23 (1972); pp. 302–4.
- Grant, R. J. S. (1973) "Laurence Nowell's transcript of B.M. Cotton Otho B. xi." in: Anglo-Saxon England; 3 (1973); pp. 111–24.
- Hilton, Chadwick B. (1986) "The Old English Seasons for Fasting: its place in the vernacular complaint tradition" in: Neophilologus; 70 (1986); pp. 155–59.
- Magennis, Hugh (2006) "The Seasons for Fasting" in: The Literary Encyclopedia. Online article.
