= Thurneysen's law =

Proposition in phonology of the Gothic language

Thurneysen's law is a proposed sound law concerning the alternation of voiced and voiceless fricatives in certain affixes in Gothic. It was first posited in 1896 and published in 1898 by Rudolf Thurneysen, a comparative linguist more famous for his work on the Celtic branch of Indo-European and in particular for his Handbuch des Altirischen.

== The problem ==
Despite being generally orthographically consistent with regard to voice, Gothic, even more so than other Germanic languages, displays a bewildering set of alternations between voiced and unvoiced spirant consonants. For example, the abstracting suffix -umni- is represented both as -ubni (fastubni, fraistubni, witubni) and as -ufni (waldufni, wundufni). These alternations, and other similar patterns unexplained by Verner's law or by Proto-Germanic sound laws in general, became the subject of Thurneysen's law.

== The solution ==
Thurneysen sought to classify the alternations in a general rule as follows:

1. Spirants are written as voiced when the preceding vowel is unstressed, and that vowel is preceded by a voiceless consonant, hence -tub-.
2. The reverse applies if, in the same circumstances the preceding consonant is voiced, hence -duf.
3. If the preceding consonant is a cluster, two possibilities arise:
  1. If the cluster is of the form /TR/, ie it contains an obstruent followed by a liquid, it is classed as a voiced consonant, and the following consonant will therefore be unvoiced.
  2. If the cluster is of the form /TY/, ie the post-obstruent position is a glide, it is classed as a voiceless consonant, and the following consonant will be voiced.

== Exceptions ==
Although seeking, in the Neogrammarian tradition, to produce an exceptionless sound law, Thurneysen himself acknowledged several classes of exception to his rule.

1. In word-final position the alternation is not always visible, due to the vagaries of the Gothic Auslautverhärtung, by which all final consonants in Gothic words could be devoiced.
2. As the second part of compound words, the stress pattern of the simplex is used to determine the form of the compound, leading to irregular output.
3. Some paradigms display the effect of analogy, or levelling, by which the original alternation of some words has been removed.
4. Thurneysen also noted seven individual words in need of special treatment – arbaid-, bairizeins, filigri, frumadei, ubizwa, haubid- and þiwadw. He provides explanations for the first five, but the latter two he leaves unexplained.

== Reception and criticism ==
The reception of Thurneysen's law has been patchy at best. Many text- and handbooks choose to completely ignore it, or to pass over it with only slight mention, and it remains among the lesser known sound laws of Germanic philology. This is perhaps in part due to its limited scope, but certainly also due to what have been perceived as problematic aspects of its formulation, and the apparent exceptions listed above.

== Recent formulations ==
In 1968, Noam Chomsky and Morris Halle published a new and somewhat less sensitive form of Thurneysen's law in modern notation. This version lacks Thurneysen's rules about consonantal clusters, and his observations on the effects of liquids. It has been therefore seen as deficient with respect to the original.

== See also ==
- Glossary of sound laws in the Indo-European languages
- Verner's law
- Grimm's law

== General references ==
- Braune, Wilhelm, Gotische Grammatik (17.ed. by Ernst A. Ebbinghaus; Niemeyer; Tübingen; 1966)
- Chomsky, Noam & Halle, Morris, The sound pattern of English (Harper & Row; New York; 1968) |
- Collinge, N E, The Laws of Indo-European (Amsterdam Studies in the Theory and History of Linguistic Science IV:35) (Amsterdam, 1985)
- Flickinger, D P, Dissimilation in Gothic without Thurneysen's Law in (CLS 17:67-75) (1981)
- Streitberg, Wilhelm, Gotisches Elementarbuch (3&4.ed; Carl Winter; Heidelberg; 1910)
- Voyles, Joseph, Gothic, Germanic and Northwest Germanic in (Zeitschrift für Dialektologie und Linguistik:39) (Steiner; Wiessbaden; 1981)
- Voyles, Joseph, Early Germanic Grammar : pre-, proto-, and post-Germanic languages (Academic Press; San Diego etc.; 1997)
- Woodhouse, Robert H. (2000). Donhauser, Karin; Grubmueller, Klaus; Mueller, Jan-Dirk (eds.). "The origin of Thurneysen's law: A detailed analysis of the evidence" (PDF). Beiträge zur Geschichte der deutschen Sprache und Literatur. 122 (2). Berlin: Walter de Gruyter: 187–229. doi:10.1515/bgsl.2000.122.2.187.
