= David Stifter =

Austrian Celtic studies scholar (born 1971)

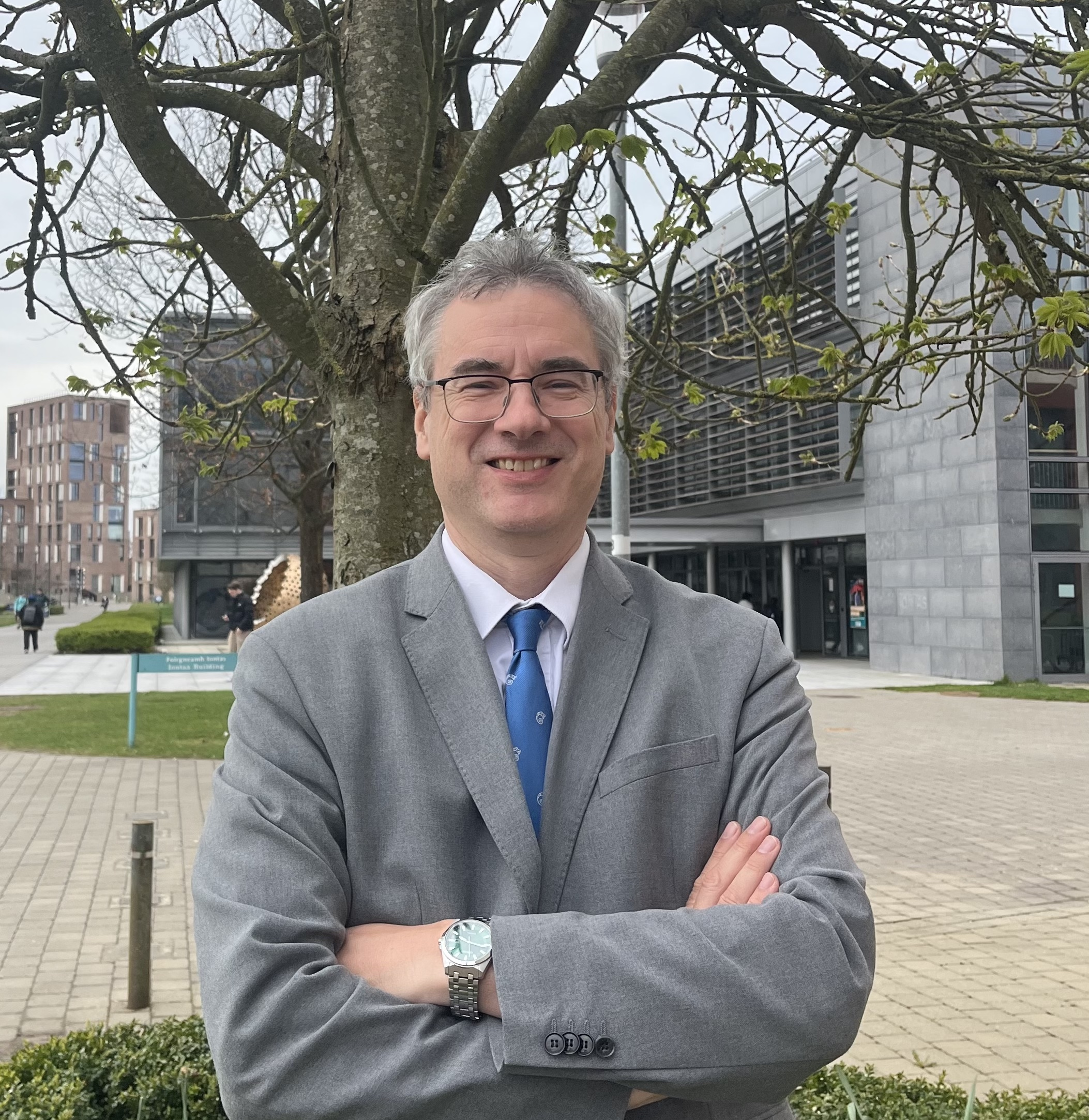
- Born: 1971 (age 54–55); Austria
- Occupation: Professor
- Awards: MRIA

Academic background
- Education: University of Vienna
- Thesis: (2003)

Academic work
- Discipline: Celtic studies, Indo-European linguistics, Historical linguistics
- Institutions: University of Vienna, Maynooth University, Dublin Institute for Advanced Studies
- Website: https://www.maynoothuniversity.ie/faculty-arts-humanities/our-people/david-stifter

David Stifter (born 29 June 1971) is an Austrian academic working primarily in Historical linguistics. He specializes in Celtic languages, including Primitive, Old and Middle Irish, as well as Continental Celtic (Lepontic, Gaulish, Celtiberian).

== Education ==
Stifter studied Latin, Russian and Indo-European studies in Vienna. In 1998, he received his Mag. phil. with a thesis on the Old Irish influence on the Latin of the Navigatio Sancti Brendani. From 2000 to 2008, he was a contract assistant at the Institute of Linguistics at the University of Vienna. In 2003, he received his doctorate with a thesis on the didactics of Old Irish.

== Career ==
From 2006, he led the research projects Dictionary of the Old Irish Glosses in the Codex Ambrosianus C 301 inf., Lexicon Leponticum and Old Celtic Language Remains in Austria.

Since 2011, he has been a professor of Old Irish at the Department of Early Irish at Maynooth University, where he led the project Chronologicon Hibernicum completed in 2021. He is currently working on digitization projects on the Gaulish inscriptions, on early medieval Irish inscriptions in Latin script and on the Ogham inscriptions found mostly in Ireland and Wales.

His research areas include language variation and change of Old Irish, language contact in the ancient world and in the British Isles in the Early Middle Ages and comparative Celtic Studies. Stifter is a founding member and board member of the Societas Celtologica Europaea (European Society of Celtic Studies), established in 2009. He is also a member of the Indo-Germanic Society (since 2005) and the Celtic Studies Association of North America (since 2012).

Stifter has also written lyrics for the Swiss band Eluveitie.

In 2022, he was elected to the Royal Irish Academy.

Since 2023, he has led the project DiAgnostic: Tracing Diatopic Variation in a Corpus of Old Irish.

In 2026, Stifter joined the School of Celtic Studies at the Dublin Institute for Advanced Studies as a senior professor.
