= A. G. van Hamel =

Dutch linguist (1886–1945)

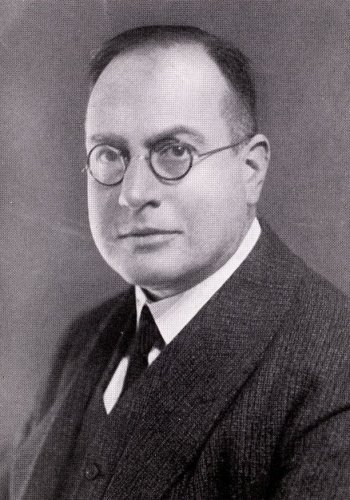
A.G. van Hamel

Anton Gerard van Hamel (5 July 1886 – 23 November 1945) was a Dutch scholar, best known for his contributions to Celtic and Germanic studies, especially those relating to literature, linguistics, philology and mythology. He is not to be confused with his uncle, Anton Gerard van Hamel (1842 – 1907), who was a theologian, professor of French and editor of De Gids.

== Early life and education ==
Van Hamel was born on 5 July 1886 in Hilversum. Having completed secondary education at the municipal grammar school (now Barlaeus Gymnasium) in Amsterdam, Van Hamel went on to study Dutch language and literature at the University of Amsterdam (UvA) between 1904 and 1908. In addition, he attended colleges and private schools in Ireland and Germany. An avid student, he published articles in Propria Cures on (early) Germanic and Celtic studies, subjects which would later become his special field of expertise. In 1911, he was awarded a doctorate, cum laude, for his research on De oudste Keltische en Angelsaksische geschiedbronnen (‘The oldest Celtic and Anglo-Saxon historical sources’) under the supervision of R.C. Boer.

== Early career (1910–1923) ==
Van Hamel's early career was characterised by a number of ebbs and flows, in which his ambition to obtain an academic chair of his preference was thwarted by either controversy or misfortune. In 1910, Van Hamel taught Dutch at the municipal grammar school in Middelburg, but felt unhappy about his position and low pay. In 1912, an attempt to obtain the chair of English professor at the UvA failed as he was openly accused of a poor grasp of English. The same year, he was teaching Dutch again, then at the Erasmiaansch Gymnasium in Rotterdam. New prospects emerged during the First World War, when he received the post of extraordinary professor of Dutch language and literature at the University of Bonn. However, troublesome experiences with the German government led Van Hamel to return to The Netherlands — ostensibly in order to visit his ill father, but he did not return to Germany. In 1917, he found a position as librarian at the Netherlands School of Commerce (Nederlandsche Handels-Hoogeschool) in Rotterdam. His nomination in 1918 for the chair of Dutch language and literature held by Jan te Winkel at the UvA projected him unfavourably into the spotlight, as several linguists voiced their objections, often in favour of another scholar of their choice. Van Hamel remained librarian, though he saw opportunity to combine his work with a private teaching position of Celtic at Leiden University. In 1921, he moved from Rotterdam to Den Haag, being appointed librarian of the Peace Palace.

== Chair of early Germanic and Celtic studies (1923) ==
1923 finally saw a breakthrough in Van Hamel's career. After eleven years of fruitless endeavours and cul-de-sacs, he obtained the Chair of early Germanic studies at the State University of Utrecht. Significantly, Celtic studies were added to the chair's curriculum at his special request, as he was convinced, and convinced others, that the two disciplines were closely related. His improved situation enabled him to devote his time and energy more fully to the publication of text editions and critical studies. In 1925, Van Hamel became a member of the Royal Netherlands Academy of Arts and Sciences (Koninklijke Nederlandse Akademie van Wetenschappen).

== Late 1930s – Second World War ==
A new personal crisis unfolded towards the close of the 1930s, when Van Hamel's writing output came to a standstill. The interruption was related to political developments which were spreading over Europe, but possibly also to his homosexual nature. During the Second World War and the German occupation of the Netherlands, A.G. van Hamel came to be active again, but the new situation stood in the way of communication with foreign contacts and greatly limited his prospects at publication. After the academic crisis of 1943, when the Germans had unsuccessfully attempted to impose a ‘declaration of loyalty’ on all students and faculty members, Van Hamel's work for the university was quickly slimmed down and he therefore focused on his publications instead.

== Death ==
About six months after the liberation of The Netherlands, Van Hamel was suddenly hospitalised for an emergency surgery due to an intestinal disease. He died on 23 November 1945 in Utrecht, in narcosis, aged 59.

== Select bibliography ==
- 1911. De oudste Keltische en Angelsaksische geschiedbronnen. Middelburg (dissertation)
- 1912. “On Anglo-Irish Syntax.” Englische Studien 45.
- 1914. “On Lebor Gabála.” Zeitschrift für celtische Philologie 10.
- 1915-16. E.M. Post en Hirschfeld (Tds. N.T.L. dl. 34)
- 1915-6. “The foreign notes in the three Fragments of Irish Annals.” Revue Celtique 36. 1–22.
- 1923. Het Gotisch handboek. Haarlem.
- 1925-1945 Editorial work for Neophilologus
- 1926. “De accentuatie van het Munster-Iersch.” In: Mededeelingen der Koninklijke Akademie van Wetenschappen, afdeling Letterkunde, 61 A. Amsterdam. 287–324.
- 1927. "The battle of Leitir Ruide." Revue Celtique 44. 59–67.
- 1929. “Hengest and his namesake.” In Studies in English philology: a miscellany in honor of Frederick Klaeber, eds. Kemp Malone and Martin B. Ruud. Minneapolis. 159–71.
- 1929. "On Vọlundarkviða." In: Arkiv för nordisk filologi 45: 150–67.
- 1930. "The Celtic Grail." Revue Celtique 47. 340–82.
- 1932. Ed. Lebor Bretnach: the Irish version of the Historia Britonum ascribed to Nennius. Edited from all the manuscripts. Dublin.
- 1932. "Ođin Hanging on the Tree." Acta philologica Scandinavica 7. 200–88.
- 1933. Compert con Culain and other stories. Mediaeval and Modern Irish 3. Dublin: DIAS.
- 1936 for 1934. Aspects of Celtic mythology. Sir John Rhys Memorial Lecture. Proceedings of the British Academy 20. 207–48.
- 1935-1936. "The Saga of Sorli the Strong." Acta philologica Scandinavica. Tidsskrift for nordisk sprogforskning 10. 265–95.
- 1936. "Gods, Skalds and Magic." Saga-book of the Viking Society 11. 129–52.
- 1936. "The Conception of Fate in Early Teutonic and Celtic Religion." Saga-book of the Viking Society 11. 202–14.
- 1936. “The Old-Norse version of the Historia Regum Britanniae and the text of Geoffrey of Monmouth.” Études Celtiques 2: 197–247.
- 1938. “The text of Immram Curaig Maíldúin.” Études Celtiques 3: 1-20.
- 1940. Ed. De tuin der goden. Retellings of a wide variety of myths, intended for a wide audience.
- 1941. Immrama. Mediaeval and Modern Irish 10. Dublin.
- 1943. “Arthur van Britannië en Aneirin.” Neophilologus 28:3: 218–28.
- 1944. “Keltische letterkunde.” In Algemene literatuurgeschiedenis. Part 2.
- 1946. Primitieve Ierse taalstudie. Mededelingen van de Koninklijke Akademie van Wetenschappen.

== Stichting A.G. van Hamel voor Keltische studies ==
A Dutch organisation founded in 1991 for the promotion of Celtic studies, particularly in The Netherlands, has named itself after and in honour of the Dutch scholar: Stichting A.G. van Hamel voor Keltische studies ('A.G. van Hamel Foundation for Celtic studies'). Its regular activities include the organisation of lectures, notably the 'Van Hamel Lecture' and an annual colloquium, and the publication of a Dutch quarterly called Kelten.
