= Súaltam =

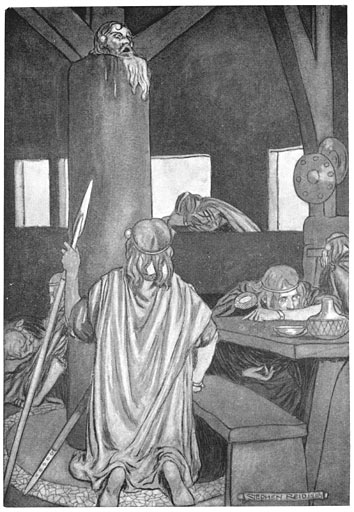
Súaltam's head continues to cry out a warning: illustration by Stephen Reid, from T. W. Rolleston, Myths and Legends of the Celtic Race, 1911

Súaltam (Súaltaim, Súaldam, Súaldaim, Súaltach) mac Róich is the mortal father of the hero Cúchulainn in the Ulster Cycle of Irish mythology. His wife is Deichtine, sister of Conchobar mac Nessa, king of Ulster. His brother is Fergus mac Róich.

The nature of Cúchulainn's parentage is unclear and inconsistent. In one version, Deichtine fosters the baby son of Lugh, but he becomes sick and dies. Then she is made pregnant by Lugh, who tells her to name the child Sétanta, but as she is betrothed to Súaltam, she aborts the pregnancy, marries Súaltam and has his child, whom she names Sétanta. The child is later renamed Cúchulainn. In another version, Deichtine disappears from Emain Macha, until the nobles of Ulster are led by a flock of magical birds to a house, where they are welcomed by Lugh. He tells them his wife is due to give birth soon, and when she does the Ulstermen discover she is Deichtine. The child is named Sétanta. He is brought up by Súaltam and Deichtine in their house on Muithemne Plain in County Louth.

Seventeen years later, when queen Medb of Connacht launches the Táin Bó Cúailnge (Cattle Raid of Cooley) against Ulster, Cúchulainn and Súaltam are watching the border at Iraird Cuilenn (Crossakiel, County Meath). While Cúchulainn tries to hold up the army's advance, Súaltam goes to warn the Conchobar. For unexplained reasons, he does not arrive at Emain Macha for several months. He burst in and cries out that men are being killed, women abducted, and cattle plundered, and that Ailill mac Máta, king of Connacht, is responsible. However, he is ignored, for he has failed to follow precedence - no man could speak before the king, and the king could not speak before his three druids - and Conchobar and his druids agree he should be executed. As Súaltam runs out, he falls against the sharpened rim of his shield and decapitates himself. His severed head is brought back on his shield still crying out that men are being murdered, women abducted and cattle plundered. Finally Conchobar is roused to action and gathers his army for battle.
