= Celtic studies =

Study of cultural output relating to the Celtic-speaking peoples

The Celtic nations, where most Celtic speakers are now concentrated

Celtic studies or Celtology is the academic discipline occupied with the study of any sort of cultural output relating to the Celtic-speaking peoples (i.e. speakers of Celtic languages). This ranges from linguistics, literature and art history, archaeology and history, the focus lying on the study of the various Celtic languages, living and extinct. The primary areas of focus are the six Celtic languages currently in use: Irish, Scottish Gaelic, Manx, Welsh, Cornish, and Breton.

As a university subject, it is taught at a number of universities, most of them in Ireland, the United Kingdom, or France, but also in the United States, Canada, Australia, Germany, Poland, Austria and the Netherlands.

== History ==
Written studies of the Celts, their cultures, and their languages go back to classical Greek and Latin accounts, possibly beginning with Hecataeus in the 6th century BC and best known through such authors as Polybius, Posidonius, Pausanias, Diodorus Siculus, Julius Caesar and Strabo. Modern Celtic studies originated in the aftermath of the Gutenberg Revolution, when many of these classical authors were rediscovered, mass produced using the printing press, and translated into vernacular languages.

Academic interest in Celtic languages grew out of comparative and historical linguistics, which were established at the end of the 18th century. In the 16th century, Renaissance humanist George Buchanan, a native speaker of the Scottish Gaelic language, comparatively studied the Goidelic languages. The first major breakthrough in Celtic linguistics came with the publication of Archaeologia Britannica (1707) by the Welsh scholar Edward Lhuyd, who was the first to recognise that Gaulish, Welsh, Cornish, and Irish all belong to the same language family. Lhuyd also published an English translation of a study by Paul-Yves Pezron into Gaulish.

In 1767 James Parsons published his study The Remains of Japhet, being historical enquiries into the affinity and origins of the European languages. He compared a 1000-word lexicon of Irish and Welsh and concluded that they were originally the same, then comparing the numerals in many other languages.

The second big leap forwards was made when Sir William Jones postulated that Sanskrit, Avestan, Greek, Latin and many other languages including "the Celtic" derived from a common ancestral language. This hypothesis, published in The Sanscrit Language (1786), would later be hailed as the discovery of the Indo-European language family, from which grew the field of Indo-European studies.

Although Jones' trail-blazing hypothesis inspired numerous linguistic studies, it was not until Bavarian linguist Johann Kaspar Zeuss's monumental Grammatica Celtica (volume 1, 1851; volume 2, 1853) that any truly significant progress was made. Written in Latin, the work draws on the earliest Old Irish, Middle Welsh and other Celtic primary sources to construct a comparative grammar, which was the first to lay out a firm basis for Celtic philology. Among his many other achievements, Zeuss was able to decipher and explain Old Irish verbal and grammatical rules and also definitively linked the Celtic languages to the Indo-European language family

== Celtic studies in the Germanosphere and the Netherlands ==
German Celtic studies (Keltologie) is seen by many as having been established by Johann Kaspar Zeuss (1806–1856). In 1847, he was appointed professor of linguistics at LMU Munich. Until the middle of the 19th century, Celtic studies progressed largely as a subfield of linguistics. Franz Bopp (1791–1867) carried out further studies in comparative linguistics to link the Celtic languages to the Proto-Indo-European language. He is credited with having finally proven Celtic to be a branch of the Indo-European language family. From 1821 to 1864, he served as a professor of oriental literature and general linguistics in Berlin.

In 1896, Kuno Meyer and Ludwig Christian Stern founded the Zeitschrift für celtische Philologie (ZCP), the first academic journal solely devoted to aspects of Celtic languages and literature, and still in existence today. In the second half of the century, significant contributions were made by the Orientalist Ernst Windisch (1844–1918). He held a chair in Sanskrit at the University of Leipzig; but he is best remembered for his numerous publications in the field of Celtic studies. In 1901, the Orientalist and Celtologist Heinrich Zimmer (1851–1910) was made professor of Celtic languages at Friedrich Wilhelm University in Berlin, the first position of its kind in Germany. He was followed in 1911 by Kuno Meyer (1858–1919), who, in addition to numerous publications in the field, was active in the Irish independence movement.

Perhaps the most important German-speaking Celticist was Swiss scholar Rudolf Thurneysen (1857–1940). A student of Windisch and Zimmer, Thurneysen was appointed to the chair of comparative linguistics at the University of Freiburg in 1887; he succeeded to the equivalent chair at the University of Bonn in 1913. His notability arises from his work on Old Irish. For his masterwork, Handbuch des Altirischen ("Handbook of Old Irish", 1909), translated into English as A Grammar of Old Irish, he located and analysed a multitude of Old Irish manuscripts. His work is considered as the basis for all succeeding studies of Old Irish.

In 1920, Julius Pokorny (1887–1970) was appointed to the chair of Celtic languages at Friedrich Wilhelm University, Berlin. Despite his support for centrist German nationalism and membership in the Catholic Church in Germany, he was forced out of his university position by the Nazis on account of his Jewish ancestry. He subsequently fled as a refugee to Switzerland but returned to Germany in 1955 to teach at LMU Munich. In Berlin, he was succeeded in 1937 by Ludwig Mühlhausen, a devout Nazi.

After World War II, Celtic studies predominantly continued in West Germany and the Second Austrian Republic. Studies in the field continued at Freiburg, Bonn, Marburg, Hamburg as well as Innsbruck; however, an independent professorship in Celtic studies has not been instituted anywhere. In this period, Hans Hartmann, Heinrich Wagner and Wolfgang Meid made notable contributions to the scientific understanding of the boundaries of the Celtic language area and the location of the homeland of the Celtic peoples. In what became East Berlin chair in Celtic languages at what was renamed Humboldt University has remained unoccupied since 1966.

Today, Celtic studies is only taught at a handful of German universities, including those of Bonn, Trier, and Mannheim, the Johannes Gutenberg University of Mainz, and the Philipps University of Marburg. It is also taught at the University of Vienna. Only Marburg, Vienna and Bonn maintain formal programs of study, but even then usually as a subsection of comparative or general linguistics. Only Marburg offers an M.A. course specifically in Celtic Studies. No Celtic studies research has taken place in the former centres of Freiburg, Hamburg or Berlin since the 1990s. The last remaining chair in Celtic studies, that at Humboldt University of Berlin, was abolished in 1997.

The only Chair of Celtic studies in Continental Europe is at Utrecht University (in the Netherlands). It was established in 1923, when Celtic studies were added to the Chair of Germanic studies on the special request of its new professor A. G. van Hamel.

== Celtic studies in Ireland and the United Kingdom ==
Celtic studies are taught in universities in the United Kingdom and the Republic of Ireland. These studies cover language, history, archaeology and art. In addition, Celtic languages are taught to a greater or lesser extent in schools in Wales, the island of Ireland, Scotland, Cornwall and the Isle of Man.

The formal study of Celtic Studies at British universities in the late nineteenth century gave rise to the establishment of chairs for Sir John Rhŷs, first Jesus Professor of Celtic at the University of Oxford, in 1874 and for Donald MacKinnon, first Chair of Celtic at the University of Edinburgh, in 1882. Institutions in the United Kingdom that have Celtic Studies departments and courses are: the Universities of Aberdeen, Aberystwyth, Bangor, Cambridge, Cardiff, Edinburgh, Exeter (which houses the Institute of Cornish Studies), Glasgow, Oxford, Swansea, Trinity St David's, Queen's University Belfast, Ulster University, the University of the Highlands and Islands and the University of Wales, Centre for Advanced Welsh and Celtic Studies. The top five rated degree-awarding programmes/departments as of 2017 are; (1) Department of Anglo-Saxon, Norse and Celtic at University of Cambridge (2) Welsh and Celtic Studies at Bangor University (3) Welsh and Celtic Studies at Cardiff University (4) Celtic and Gaelic at University of Glasgow (5) Irish and Celtic Studies at Queen's University, Belfast.

A major funder of Celtic Studies doctoral studies in the United Kingdom is the AHRC-funded Centre for Doctoral Training in the Celtic Languages, which admitted PhD students in the period 2014–2019. The CDT in Celtic Languages is administered through Celtic and Gaelic at the University of Glasgow and its director is Prof. Katherine Forsyth.

=== Ireland ===
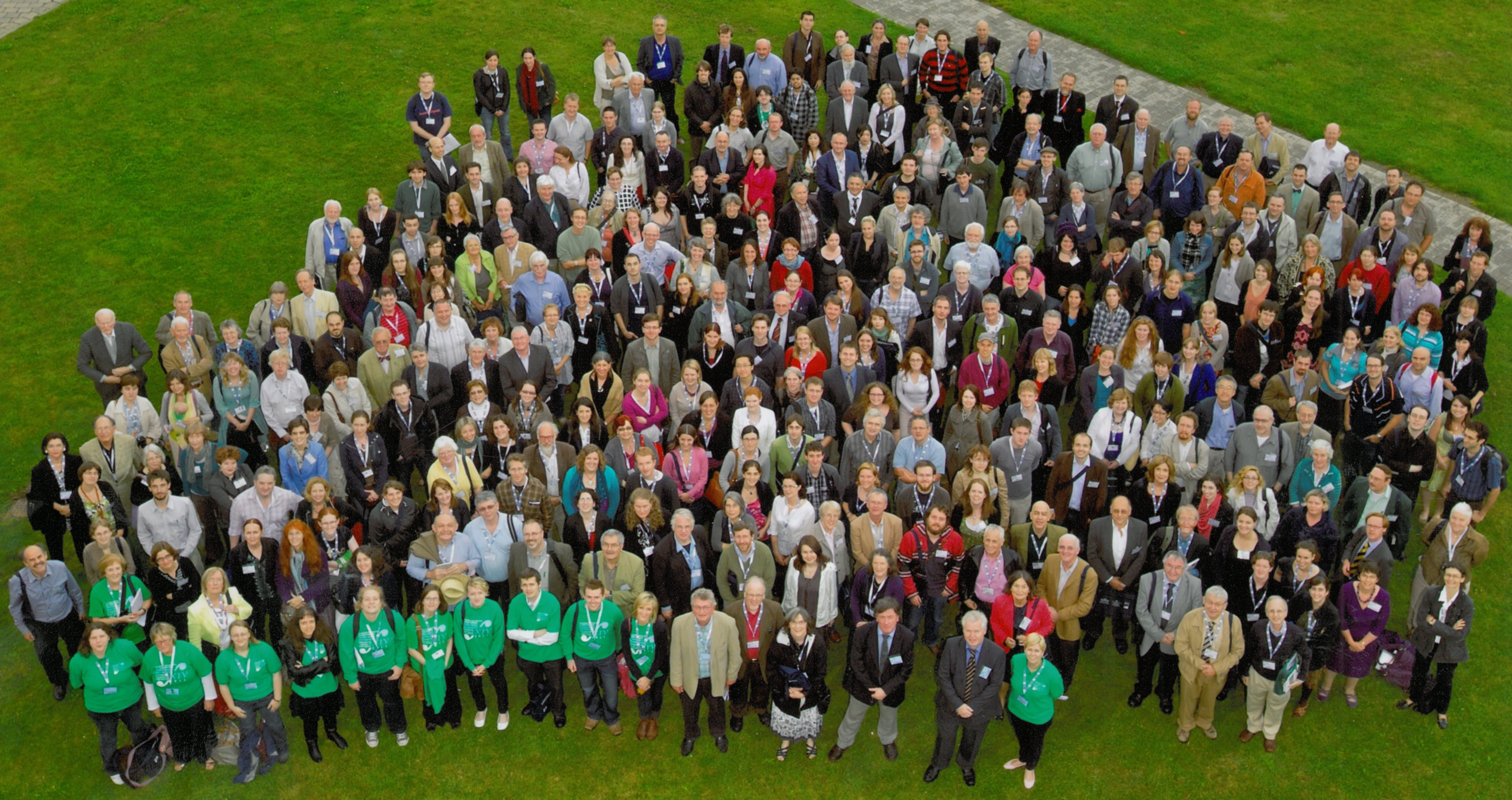
Scholars at the XIV International Congress of Celtic Studies, Maynooth 2011

Celtic studies and Irish studies are taught in universities in Northern Ireland and the Republic of Ireland. These studies cover language, history, archaeology and art. In addition, the Irish language is taught to a greater or lesser extent in schools across the island of Ireland.

The beginning of Celtic Studies as a university subject in Ireland might be dated to Eugene O'Curry's appointment as professor of Irish history and archaeology at the Catholic University of Ireland in 1854. In the republic, Celtic Studies, either as full Celtic Studies programmes or as Irish language programmes, are now offered in the University of Galway, University College Cork, University College Dublin (the successor institution to the Catholic University), National University of Ireland, Maynooth, Trinity College Dublin, University of Limerick, Mary Immaculate College, Limerick, Dublin City University. The Dublin Institute for Advanced Studies (DIAS), School of Celtic Studies, is a research institution but does not award degrees. DIAS and the Royal Irish Academy are leading publishers of Celtic Studies research, including the journals Celtica and Ériu.

In Northern Ireland, Queen's University Belfast and Ulster University offer Celtic studies programmes. In Northern Ireland, Queen's University Belfast and Ulster University also offer Celtic studies.

=== Scotland ===
In 1874, Donald MacKinnon became the first Chair of Celtic studies at the University of Edinburgh, in 1882. Aberdeen, Glasgow and the University of the Highlands and Islands also have Celtic studies departments.

A major funder of UK Celtic Studies doctoral studies is the AHRC-funded Centre for Doctoral Training in the Celtic Languages, which admitted PhD students in the period 2014–2019. The CDT in Celtic Languages is administered through Celtic and Gaelic at the University of Glasgow and its director is Prof. Katherine Forsyth.

=== Wales ===
The first Jesus Professor of Celtic at the University of Oxford was John Rhŷs. The University of Wales established the Centre for Advanced Welsh and Celtic Studies, also covering Welsh studies.

=== Cornwall ===
The Institute of Cornish Studies is based in Falmouth, Cornwall.

== Celtic studies in North America ==
In North America, Celtic scholars and students are represented professionally by the Celtic Studies Association of North America.

=== In Canada ===
Several universities in Canada offer some Celtic studies courses, while only two universities offers a full B.A. as well as graduate courses. St. Michael's College at the University of Toronto and St. Francis Xavier University offers the only B.A. of its kind in Canada with a dual focus on Celtic literature and history, while the Pontifical Institute of Mediaeval Studies at the University of Toronto offers courses at a graduate level through their Centre for Medieval Studies, along with St. Francis Xavier University.

Other Canadian universities which offer courses in Celtic, Scottish or Irish studies include Cape Breton University, Saint Mary's University, Halifax, Simon Fraser University, the University of Guelph and the University of Ottawa.

=== In the United States of America ===
In the United States, Harvard University is notable for its Doctorate program in Celtic studies. Celtic studies are also offered at the universities of Wisconsin-Milwaukee, California–Berkeley, California–Los Angeles, Bard College, and many others, including programs in which a student may minor, like at the College of Charleston. Some aspects of Celtic studies can be accessed through Irish Studies programmes, such as at the University of Notre Dame.

== Celtic studies in France ==
In 1804, the Académie Celtique was founded with the goal of unearthing the Gallic past of the French people. France also produced the first academic journal devoted to Celtic studies, Revue Celtique. Revue Celtique was first published in 1870 in Paris and continued until the death of its last editor, Joseph Loth, in 1934. After that point it was continued under the name Études Celtiques.

The University of Western Brittany (Brest) offers a two-year, international European-Union certified master's degree course entitled "Celtic languages and Cultures in Contact". It is part of the Centre for Breton and Celtic Research (CRBC). Closely linked to this MA programme, the University of Western Brittany organizes an intensive two-week Summer School in Breton Language and Cultural Heritage Studies every year in June. This Summer School is also sponsored by the CRBC and welcomes scholars from around the world with an interest in the Celtic (and minority) languages and cultures to study Breton, the least known of the living Celtic languages.

== Celtic studies elsewhere ==
Celtic studies are also taught at other universities elsewhere in Europe, including the Charles University in Prague (Czech Republic), University of Poznań (Poland), The John Paul II Catholic University of Lublin (Poland), Moscow State University (Russia), Uppsala University (Sweden)

Irish studies are taught at the University of Burgos (Spain) and the University of A Coruña (Galicia). Galicia also has its own Institute for Celtic Studies.

Celtic Studies are taught at both undergraduate and postgraduate levels at the University of Sydney (Australia), which also hosts the triennial Australian Conference of Celtic Studies.

== International Congress of Celtic Studies ==
The International Congress of Celtic Studies is the foremost academic conference in the field of Celtic Studies and is held every four years. Held every four years, it was first held in Dublin in 1959. The XV International Congress of Celtic Studies was held at the University of Glasgow in 2015. In 2019, the XVI ICCS was held at Bangor University and the XVII ICCS was held at Utrecht University in 2023. The XVIII ICCS will be held at the Irish College at Salamanca in 2027.

== Areas of Celtic studies ==
- Archaeology
- Linguistics and philology (historical linguistics)
- Ethnology
- Folklore
- History
- Literature
- Onomastics (Toponymy)
- Religious studies (see Celtic Christianity)
- Political science

== Notable Celticists ==
- Osborn Bergin (1873–1950)
- D. A. Binchy (1899–1989)
- Liam Breatnach
- Rachel Bromwich (1915–2010)
- John Lorne Campbell (1906-1996)
- John Carey (Celticist)
- Nora Chadwick (1891–1972)
- Thomas Owen Clancy
- Ann Dooley
- Maartje Draak (1907–1995)
- Thomas Charles-Edwards (born 1943)
- Peter Berresford Ellis (born 1943)
- Christiane Éluère (born 1946)
- Ellis Evans (1930–2013)
- Robin Flower (1881–1946)
- Katherine Forsyth
- Sir Idris Foster (1911–1984)
- John Fraser (1882–1945)
- Richard Gendall (1924–2017)
- Ken George
- R. Geraint Gruffydd (1928–2015)
- Anton Gerard van Hamel (1886–1945)
- Marged Haycock
- Máire Herbert
- Kathleen Hughes (1926–1977)
- Kenneth Hurlstone Jackson (1909–1991)
- Henry Jenner (1848–1934)
- Bobi Jones (1929–2017)
- Raimund Karl (born 1969)
- Fergus Kelly
- Eleanor Knott (1886–1975)
- Alexander Macbain (1855–1907)
- Proinsias Mac Cana
- Fr. Allan MacDonald (1859-1905)
- Bernhard Maier (born 1963)
- Ranko Matasović (born 1968)
- Kim McCone (born 1950)
- Eoin McKiernan (1915–2004)
- Kuno Meyer (1858–1919)
- Exequiel Monge Allen (born 1987)
- John Morris-Jones (1864–1929)
- Robert Morton Nance (1873–1959)
- Máirín Ní Dhonnchadha
- Máire Ní Mhaonaigh
- Michael Newton
- Donnchadh Ó Corráin
- Brian Ó Cuív
- Breandán Ó Madagain (1932–2020)
- Roibeard Ó Maolalaigh (born 1966)
- Cecile O'Rahilly (1894–1980)
- T. F. O'Rahilly (1883–1953)
- Morfydd E. Owen
- Julius Pokorny (1887–1970)
- Sir John Rhŷs (1840–1915)
- Peter Schrijver (born 1963)
- Ailbhe Mac Shamhráin (1954–2011)
- Margaret Fay Shaw (1903-2004)
- Patrick Sims-Williams (born 1949)
- Marie-Louise Sjoestedt (1900–1940)
- Whitley Stokes (1830–1909)
- Brian Stowell (1936–2019)
- Thomas Taylor (1858–1938)
- Derick Thomson (1921–2012)
- Rudolf Thurneysen (1857–1940)
- Calvert Watkins (1933–2013)
- Glanmor Williams (1920–2005)
- Sir Ifor Williams (1881–1965)
- J. E. Caerwyn Williams (1912–1999)
- Nicholas Williams (born 1942)
- Ernst Windisch (1844–1918)
- Winifred Wulff (1895–1946)
- Johann Kaspar Zeuss (1806–1856)
- Heinrich Zimmer (1851–1910)

== Notable academic journals ==
- Zeitschrift für celtische Philologie (ZCP), est. 1896, Halle.
- Revue Celtique (RC), est. 1870, Paris; continued after 1934 by Études celtiques.
- Ériu est. 1904, Dublin.
- The Bulletin of the Board of Celtic Studies (BBCS), est. 1921, Cardiff; merged with Studia Celtica in 1993.
- Études Celtiques (EC), est. 1936, Paris.
- Celtica. Journal of the School of Celtic Studies, est. 1949, Dublin.
- Studia Celtica, est. 1966, Cardiff.
- Éigse. A Journal of Irish Studies, est. 1939, Dublin.
- Cambrian Medieval Celtic Studies (CMCS), est. 1993, Aberystwyth; formerly Cambridge Medieval Celtic Studies.
- Peritia. Journal of the Medieval Academy of Ireland, Cork.

== The Derek Allen Prize ==
The Derek Allen Prize, awarded annually by the British Academy since 1977, rotates between Celtic Studies, Numismatics and Musicology. Recent winners in the field of Celtic Studies include: Prof. Máire Herbert (2018), Prof. Pierre-Yves Lambert (2015) and Prof. Fergus Kelly (2012). Prof. Herbert is the first female Celticist to be awarded this prize.

== See also ==
- Irish American Cultural Institute
- Irish studies
- Scottish studies

== General references ==
- Busse, Peter E. "Zeitschrift für celtische Philologie". In Celtic Culture. A Historical Encyclopedia, ed. J.T. Koch. 5 vols: vol. 5. Santa Barbara et al., 2006. p. 1823.
