= Máirín Ní Dhonnchadha =

Irish academic and scholar

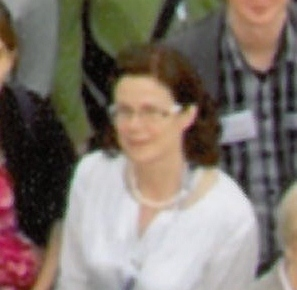
Máirín Ní Dhonnchadha at the XIV International Congress of Celtic Studies Maynooth 2011

Máirín Ní Dhonnchadha is an Irish academic and scholar. She is Established Professor of Old and Middle Irish and Celtic Philology (Sean- agus Meán-Ghaeilge agus Teangeolaíocht Cheilteach) at National University of Ireland, Galway. She graduated from University College, Cork, with a BA in Celtic Studies, and MAs and PhD in Old Irish and Middle Irish from Cork, Jesus College, Oxford, and the School of Celtic Studies at Dublin Institute for Advanced Studies. She has been "Assistant Editor at the Royal Irish Academy's Foclóir na Nua-Ghaeilge, a lecturer in Irish at University College, Dublin and Trinity College, Dublin, and an Assistant Professor at the School of Celtic Studies, DIAS." She has taught at Galway since 1996.

Her work covers medieval and modern Irish and its literature. She co-edited The Field Day Anthology of Irish Writing Volumes IV and V: Irish Women's Writings and Traditions in 2002.

== Selected bibliography ==
- (Review of) J.M. Blázquez's Religiones Prerromanas (Madrid 1983)
- "Faoi Thuairim na Deorantachta (Translation of Joep Leerssen's 'Celebrating the Unfamiliar')" in Nua-Léamha, Dublin, 1996
- The Field Day Anthology of Irish Writing Volumes IV and V: Irish Women's Writings and Traditions, 2002.
- "A note on Early Irish terms for 'blue'": addendum to A paler shade of blue: the symbology of glass beads in early medieval Ireland, by Mags Mannion, Oxford, 2017.
