= Henry Joynt =

English cricketer and rugby union footballer

Personal information
- Full name: Henry Walter Joynt
- Born: 1 July 1931 (age 95); St Giles on the Heath, Devon, England
- Batting: Right-handed
- Bowling: Right-arm medium

Domestic team information
- Years: Team
- 1957/58: Madras
- 1954–1959: Dorset
- 1952–1953: Oxford University

Career statistics
Competition	First-class
Matches	12
Runs scored	280
Batting average	14.73
100s/50s	–/–
Top score	42*
Balls bowled	1,748
Wickets	17
Bowling average	51.70
5 wickets in innings	–
10 wickets in match	–
Best bowling	4/36
Catches/stumpings	9/–
- Source: ESPNcricinfo, 4 October 2018

Henry Walter Joynt (born 1 July 1931) is an English former first-class cricketer.

He was born at St Giles on the Heath in Devon in July 1931. Joynt was educated at Bradfield College, where he played for the school cricket team from 1946 to 1949. He carried out his National Service in the Royal Artillery in 1950. The following year, upon completion of his National Service, Joynt was made a Second Lieutenant in the Royal Artillery. Joynt studied at Trinity College, Oxford, in the early 1950s. He made his debut in first-class cricket for Oxford University in 1952 against Sussex at Oxford, playing eleven first-class matches for the university in 1952–1953. He scored 256 runs in his eleven matches, with the highest score of 42 not out; as a medium pace bowler, Joynt took 13 wickets at a costly average of 63.46, with best innings figures of 3/62. While studying at Trinity, Joynt played football for Oxford University A.F.C., winning a Blue in the sport.

Having been made a temporary Lieutenant in June 1952, Joynt was given seniority in the rank in July 1954. 1954 was also the year that he debuted for Dorset in minor counties cricket, an association he would keep until 1959, having played for the county in the Minor Counties Championship eighteen times. By 1955, Joynt was on the Territorial Army Reserve of Officers list, retaining the now permanent rank of Lieutenant. He later moved to India, where he made a final appearance in first-class cricket for Madras against a touring Ceylon team in 1958 at the Madras Cricket Club Ground. He achieved his career-best bowling figures in this match, taking 4/36. Joynt played rugby union for South India as a full-back and placekicker, playing in the 1963 All India & South Asia Rugby Tournament.
