= Rudolf Thurneysen =

Swiss linguist and Celticist (1857–1940)

- Born: 9 August 1857; Basel, Switzerland
- Died: 14 March 1940 (aged 82); Bonn, Nazi Germany
- Known for: Thurneysen's law, Thurneysen–Havet's law
- Scientific career
- Fields: linguistics, comparative linguistics, Celtic languages
- Institutions: University of Jena; University of Freiburg; University of Bonn

Eduard Rudolf Thurneysen (14 March 1857 – 9 August 1940) was a Swiss linguist and Celticist.

== Biography ==
Born in Basel, Thurneysen studied classical philology in Basel, Leipzig, Berlin and Paris. His teachers included Ernst Windisch and Heinrich Zimmer. He received his promotion (approximating to a doctorate) in 1879 and his habilitation, in Latin and the Celtic languages, followed at the University of Jena in 1882.

From 1885 to 1887 he taught Latin at Jena, then taking up the Chair of Comparative Philology at the University of Freiburg where he replaced Karl Brugmann, a renowned expert in Indo-European studies.

In 1896, he posited Thurneysen's law, a proposed sound law concerning the alternation of voiced and voiceless fricatives in certain affixes in Gothic; it was later published in 1898.

In 1909 Thurneysen published his Handbuch des Alt-Irischen, translated into English as A Grammar of Old Irish by D. A. Binchy and Osborn Bergin, and still in print as of 2006. A version in Welsh was produced by Melville Richards and published by Gwasg Prifysgol Cymru (University of Wales Press) in 1935 under the title Llawlyfr Hen Wyddeleg. In 1913 he moved to the University of Bonn. It is in this period that Thurneysen has been called the greatest living authority on Old Irish.

He retired in 1923 and died in Bonn in 1940. The Rudolf Thurneysen Memorial Lecture (German: Vortrag in Memoriam Rudolf Thurneysen), given at Bonn, is named in his honour.

== Select bibliography ==
- Über Herkunft und Bildung der lateinischen Verba auf -io der dritten und vierten Conjugation und über ihr gegenseitiges Verhältniß. Leipzig 1879.
- Keltoromanisches, die keltischen Etymologieen im etymologischen Wörterbuch der romanischen Sprachen von F. Diez. Halle 1884.
- Der Saturnier und sein Verhältniss zum späteren römischen Volksverse. Halle 1885.
- Der Weg vom dactylischen Hexameter zum epischen Zehnsilber der Franzosen. 1887.
- Das Verbum être und die französische Conjugation: Ein Bruchstück aus der Entwicklungsgeschichte der französischen Flexion. Halle 1892.
- Sagen aus dem alten Irland. Berlin 1901.
- Die Etymologie: Eine akademische Rede. Freiburg 1905.
- Handbuch des Alt-Irischen: Grammatik, Texte und Wörterbuch, vol. 1: Grammatik; vol. 2: Texte mit Wörterbuch. Heidelberg 1909.
  - A Grammar of Old Irish. Revised and enlarged, with supplement. Translated by D. A. Binchy & Osborn Bergin. Dublin: School of Celtic Studies, Dublin Institute for Advanced Studies, 1975 (1st edn. 1946; reprint 1998). ISBN 1-85500-161-6
  - Old Irish Reader. Translated by D. A. Binchy & Osborn Bergin. Dublin: Dublin Institute for Advanced Studies, 1949 (reprints 1975, 1981). ISBN 0-901282-32-4
- Die irische Helden- und Königsage bis zum siebzehnten Jahrhundert. Halle 1921.
- Scéla mucce Meic Dathó. Dublin: Dublin Institute for Advanced Studies, 1986 (reprint 2004). ISBN 1-85500-022-9
