= John W. Joynt =

American politician

John W. Joynt (January 3, 1899 – March 16, 1975) was an American Democratic politician who served in the Missouri General Assembly. He served in the Missouri Senate between 1955 and 1959. Joynt was elected as president pro tempore.

Born in St. Louis, Missouri, he was educated in the public schools of St. Louis, Washington University, and the City College of Law. On January 24, 1920, Joynt married Helen Raines. He served at the Army Training Corps during World War I.
