= Celtiberian =

Celtiberian may refer to:

- Celtiberians, a Celtic people of the Iberian Peninsula
- Celtiberian language, a Celtic language
