= Carol Joynt =

Carol Ross Joynt
- Born: Denver, Colorado
- Occupations: Journalist, writer, broadcaster
- Years active: 1970s–present
- Employer: CBS News
- Known for: The Q&A Cafe; Innocent Spouse
- Notable work: Innocent Spouse
- Title: Booking producer, Face the Nation

Carol Ross Joynt is a journalist, writer, and broadcaster in the United States. She is the author of the 2011 memoir Innocent Spouse.

She hosted her own Washington-based long-form cable TV interview program, The Q&A Cafe, created in 2001, and she is currently the booking producer for Face the Nation at CBS News.

== Early life ==
Carol Ross was born in Denver, Colorado, to a military family; she started her career with the United Press International before moving on to Time Magazine.

== Journalism career ==
Joynt has worked with NBC, serving as a booking producer for Meet the Press Daily with Chuck Todd on MSNBC. Over the course of her broadcast career, she was a writer for Walter Cronkite on the CBS Evening News and a segment producer for Charlie Rose at Nightwatch, where she and Rose won the News and Documentary Emmy Award for "Outstanding Interview"; she also held producing roles with David Brinkley at This Week at ABC News, Ted Koppel at Nightline, Larry King at Larry King Live on CNN, and Hardball with Chris Matthews at MSNBC. For its brief two years on the air, she was with the syndicated USA Today: The Television Show as Washington Bureau Chief and "Life" section producer.

Joynt created The Q&A Café at Nathans in October 2001 in response to the September 11 terrorist attacks. The first "talk show in a bar," the program originally focused on interviews related to 9/11, terrorism, and the wars in Iraq and Afghanistan. Washington, D.C. Over the years, it evolved to feature a range of interviews with notable people from diverse fields.

Immediately before joining NBC, Joynt worked in the magazine business, working as an editor-at-large at the Washingtonian for three years. She wrote several hundred articles, including the monthly "Behind The Scenes" feature, and dozens of her photos were published in the magazine. From 2007 to 2016 she also wrote a weekly column about Washington power, money and social life for the New York Social Diary.

== Awards ==
While working as a writer for Walter Cronkite on the CBS Evening News, she received the Writer's Guild Award for "Best News Script" three times, alongside colleagues Charles L. West, Rabun Matthews, and Sandor M. Polster, for coverage of Watergate and the Vietnam War. The broadcast earned numerous accolades, including the Peabody and Dupont awards for its Watergate reporting. Later, as a producer for CBS News' Nightwatch, she and host Charlie Rose won a national Emmy Award for "Outstanding Interview" for a 1987 interview with Charles Manson.

== Innocent Spouse ==
Joynt's memoir, Innocent Spouse, chronicles the 12 years she owned and operated Nathans, a Georgetown bar and restaurant. When her husband died suddenly from pneumonia in February 1997, Carol was a producer for Larry King on CNN's Larry King Live. After leaving CNN and running the bar for 12 years, she closed Nathans in 2009 and returned to her career in journalism. The book was launched with a Today show interview and a book tour.

== Film Work ==
Joynt directed documentary films and oversaw several other film projects for the National Gallery of Art, working directly with J. Carter Brown. The projects included a retrospective of the NGA's 50th anniversary, and a tribute to the Kress family and their contribution to the Gallery's collections. In 1994 she made a film for the American Academy in Rome, celebrating its 100th anniversary, narrated by Isabella Rosselini.

In February 2011, Carol was diagnosed with early-stage breast cancer.
