= John Strachan (linguist) =

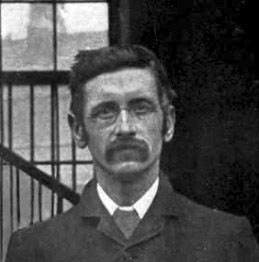
- Born: 31 January 1862; Keith, Scotland
- Died: 25 September 1907 (aged 45); Prestwich, England
- Occupations: linguist, academic
- Spouse: Mina Grant (m. 1886–1907)

Academic background
- Education: Aberdeen University; Cambridge University; Jena University

Academic work
- Institutions: Manchester University
- Main interests: Celtic Studies
- Notable works: Old-Irish paradigms and selections from the Old-Irish glosses

John Strachan (31 January 1862 – 25 September 1907) was a scholar of Sanskrit, Ancient Greek and the Celtic languages. Educated at Keith Grammar School, Aberdeen University and Pembroke College, Cambridge, he was a professor at Owens College and the Victoria University of Manchester. He is best remembered for the Thesaurus Palaeohibernicus, a collection of material in Old Irish that he edited together with Whitley Stokes, and for the textbook Old Irish Paradigms and Selections from the Old Irish Glosses, first published in 1904–05 and later revised by Osborn Bergin. Both of these works are still in print. He died in Prestwich, Lancashire, in 1907.
