= Kuno Meyer =

German philologist (1858–1919)

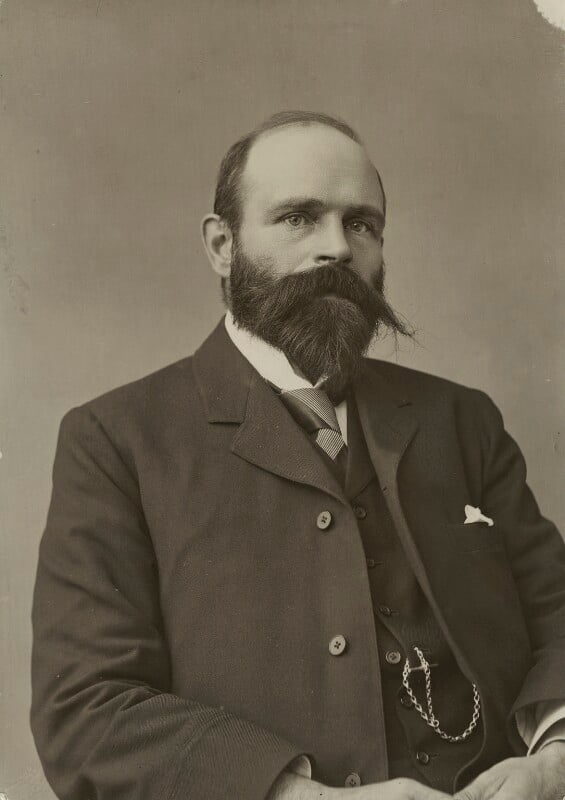
- Meyer in 1910
- Born: 20 December 1858; Free and Hanseatic City of Hamburg
- Died: 11 October 1919 (aged 60); Leipzig, Germany
- Occupation: Academic

Kuno Meyer (20 December 1858 – 11 October 1919) was a German scholar, distinguished in the field of Celtic philology and literature. His pro-German stance at the start of World War I in the United States was a source of controversy. His brother was the distinguished classical scholar, Eduard Meyer.

Meyer was considered first and foremost a lexicographer among Celtic scholars but is known by the general public in Ireland rather as the man who introduced them to Selections from Ancient Irish Poetry (1911).

He founded and edited four journals devoted to Celtic Studies, published numerous texts and translations of Old and Middle Irish romances and sagas, and wrote prolifically, his topics ranging to name origins and ancient law.

== Early life ==
Born in Hamburg, he studied there at the Gelehrtenschule of the Johanneum. He spent two years in Edinburgh, Scotland, as a teenager (1874–1876) learning English.

From 1879, he attended the University of Leipzig, where he was taught Celtic scholarship by Ernst Windisch. He received his doctorate for his thesis Eine irische Version der Alexandersage, on an Irish version of the Alexander Romance, in 1884.

== Lecturer ==
He then took up the post of lecturer in Teutonic languages at the new University College, Liverpool, the precursor of the University of Liverpool, which was established three years earlier. While at Liverpool, he was appointed to the post of MacCallum Lecturer at the University of Glasgow. He held this post for three years, delivering his first lectures in 1904. He was among those who called for the establishment of a permanent lectureship in Celtic Studies at Glasgow. On 26 October 1904, Kuno Meyer delivered a lecture titled An Appeal for a Gaelic Academy to the Liverpool branch of the Gaelic League. Throughout the lecture, Meyer draws parallels between the Irish and Hungarian language revival movements, ultimately calling upon Irish intellectuals to use the Hungarian Academy as a model from which to build an Irish academic institution.

He continued to publish on Old Irish and more general topics on the Celtic languages, as well as producing textbooks for German. In 1896, he founded and edited jointly with Ludwig Christian Stern, the prestigious Zeitschrift für celtische Philologie. He also co-founded Archiv für celtische Lexicographie in 1898 with Whitley Stokes, producing 3 volumes from 1900 to 1907.

In 1903, Meyer founded the School of Irish Learning in Dublin, and the next year created its journal Ériu of which he was the editor. Also in 1904, he became Todd Professor in the Celtic Languages at the Royal Irish Academy. In October 1911, he followed Heinrich Zimmer as Professor of Celtic Philology at Friedrich Wilhelm University in Berlin; the following year, a volume of Miscellany was presented to him by pupils and friends in honour of his election, and he was made a freeman of both Dublin and Cork.

== First World War ==
At the outbreak of the First World War, Meyer left Europe for the United States of America, where he lectured at Columbia University, University of Illinois at Urbana-Champaign, and elsewhere. (Note: Ó Lúing 1991, p. 169: "Gertrude Schoepperle had arranged for a long stay at Urbana University in Illinois".) A pro-German speech he gave in December 1914 to Clan na Gael on Long Island caused outrage in Britain and some factions among the Irish, and as a result, he was removed from the roll of freemen in Dublin and Cork and from his Honorary Professorship of Celtic at Liverpool. He also resigned as Director of the School of Irish Learning and editor of Ériu.

Harvard University also had extended an invitation to Meyer to lecture on campus, but it subsequently "disinvited" him on in the fall of 1914 on account of Meyer's pro-German activity.

Meyer nevertheless accepted candidacy for the post of exchange professor at Harvard, at the recommendation of German professors there. However, when the April 1915 issue of The Harvard Advocate awarded first prize to an anti-German satirical poem "Gott mit Uns" written by an undergraduate, Meyer sent the university (and the press) a letter of protest, rebuking the faculty members who served as judges for failure to exercise neutrality. Meyer also declined his candidacy for the exchange professorship in the letter. In a reply, President Abbott Lawrence Lowell said, in explaining Harvard's policy, that freedom of speech includes pro-German and pro-Allied voices alike.

== Later life ==
He was injured in a railway collision in 1915 and met 27-year-old Florence Lewis while he was recovering in a California hospital. They married shortly afterwards. Florence went to Germany in 1916, Meyer in 1917. In 1919 Florence and her daughter went to Switzerland. He died in Leipzig.

== Legacy ==
Posthumously, in 1920, Meyer's name was restored, both by Dublin and Cork, in their Rolls of Honorary Freemen. The restoration happened on 19 April 1920 in Dublin, where Sinn Féin had won control of the City Council three months before, rescinding the decision taken in 1915 by the Irish Parliamentary Party.

In 1965, the Gaelic League and the Irish Press petitioned the restoration as they were unaware that it had already occurred.

Meyer was regranted the Freedom of the City of Cork, as follows: "Re-elected 14th May, 1920, and order of Council of the 8th January, 1915, expunging his name from the roll rescinded".

Also in 1920, Meyer was described by his acquaintance Douglas Hyde, Celtic philologist and later president of the Republic of Ireland, as "one of the most lovable men who ever existed, and himself undoubtedly in love with Ireland". Hyde credited him with advancing the goals of the Gaelic League when the question arose whether to allow the teaching of the Irish language in the Intermediate Education of Ireland.

W. T. Cosgrave, later president of the Irish Free State, as a Dublin councilman, had strenuously opposed the removal of Meyer's name from Dublin's Freemen roll in the first place. Cosgrave wrote in a letter that Meyer was recognized as "the greatest Celtic authority since the death of Whitley Stokes" and that he has "done more for Irish scholarship and Irish national glory than any other living man".

In 2004, on the centenary of the publication of Ériu, Proinsias Mac Cana described Kuno Meyer as a "great" scholar, in "brilliant" partnership with John Strachan as the first editors of Ériu, his predecessors in that position. Meyer is among those credited with playing a crucial role in fostering native Irish Celtists in the initial phases of Ériu and the School of Irish Learning, and when the editorship over Ériu later passed to the succeeding generation of Irish scholars, tantamount to the fulfilment of the "primary intention of Meyer and his associates".

== Collections ==
University College London Special Collections holds correspondence from Meyer discussing a translation of work.

== Selected bibliography ==
- 1885: The Irish Odyssey
- 1892: The Vision of MacConglinne, with A. Nutt
- 1894: The Voyage of Bran
- 1896: Early Relations of the Brython and Gael
- 1901: King and Hermit
- 1904: An Appeal for a Gaelic Academy
- 1905: Cáin Adamnáin: An Old Irish Treatise on the Law of Adamnan
- 1911: Selections from Ancient Irish Poetry
- 1912: Sanas Cormaic, an Old Irish Glossary
- 1913: Learning in Ireland in the Fifth Century
- 1914: Über die älteste irische Dichtung

=== Festschrift ===
- Miscellany presented to Kuno Meyer by some of his friends and pupils on the occasion of his appointment to the chair of Celtic philology in the University of Berlin; ed. by Osborn Bergin and Carl Marstrander. Halle: M. Niemeyer, 1912.
