= Études Celtiques =

French academic journal

Études Celtiques (EC) (French: [etyd sɛltik], Celtic Studies) is a French academic journal based in Paris.

It started life under the name Revue Celtique, which was founded in 1870 by Henri Gaidoz. Between 1870 and 1934, 52 volumes were published under the editorial supervision of Celtic scholars such as Henri Gaidoz, Henri d'Arbois de Jubainville, and Joseph Loth. Revue Celtique was the first journal to be wholly devoted to Celtic studies, particularly Celtic linguistics and philology, and remains essential for scholars today, in part owing to the publication of many text editions which have not since been superseded. It published contributions by Henri d'Arbois de Jubainville, Joseph Loth, Georges Dottin, Émile Ernault, Joseph Vendryes, Whitley Stokes, Kuno Meyer, and many others.

Following the death of its last editor Joseph Loth (1847–1934), Joseph Vendryes (1875–1960) continued the journal under the name of Études Celtiques, which saw its first issue in 1936. Volume 45 was published in 2019.
