= School of Irish Learning =

Irish academic institution (1903–1926)

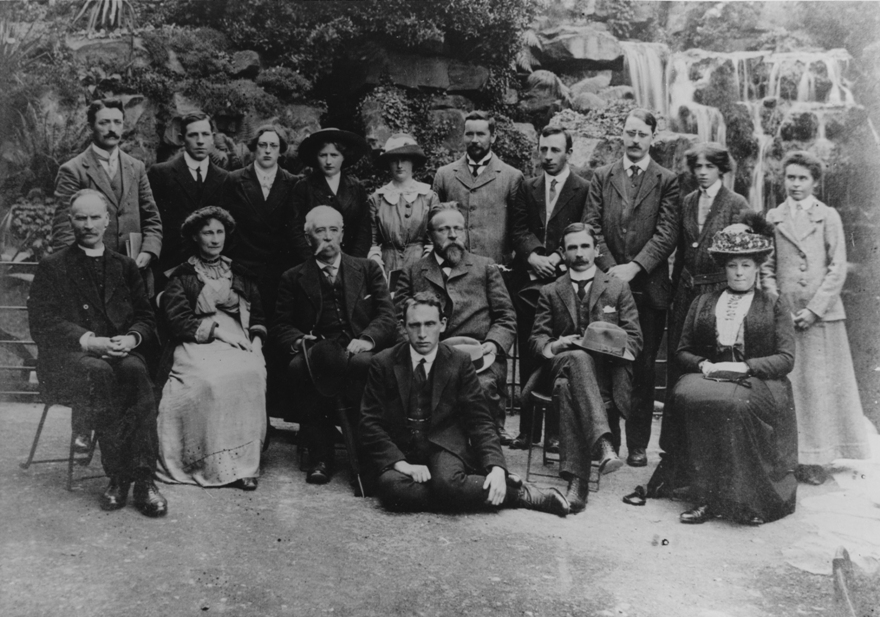
School of Irish Learning in 1913

The School of Irish Learning was a centre for Irish studies in Dublin founded in 1903 by Kuno Meyer, who talked of "the necessity of bringing the [Irish revivalist] movement into direct and intimate relations with scholarship, to provide an avenue for every student of Irish to the higher regions of study and research, to crown the whole edifice by a revival of native scholarship, and thus to bring about a second golden age of Irish learning."

The school's honorary secretary was R. I. Best, and among the first students were Osborn Bergin and T. F. O'Rahilly. The school published books on language and history which remain standard textbooks for undergraduate courses in Irish, and in 1904 it instituted the scholarly journal Ériu, of which Meyer was the editor.

The principal object of the School was to provide a thorough professional grounding in linguistics, philology, and textual studies for students who had an advanced competence in Irish and Celtic languages. Instruction was for the most part organized in the form of intensive Summer Schools which were conducted by distinguished scholars invited from overseas, e.g. by Holger Pedersen, Henry Sweet, and Rudolf Thurneysen. John Strachan had a more central rôle, almost equal to that of Kuno Meyer himself. Because its activities were organized in this way, and because it had to depend on uncertain sources of funding, the School from the outset had the character of a temporary expedient... Inevitably, the School would become largely redundant once effective undergraduate and postgraduate training in Irish and Celtic languages had been properly established in Irish Universities...

The governors and trustees applied to have the school incorporated into the Royal Irish Academy; the terms of incorporation were agreed on in 1925, the academy undertaking to maintain the school's publications in print, and in 1926 the school ended its existence.
