= Whitley Stokes (Celtic scholar) =

Irish lawyer and Celtic scholar

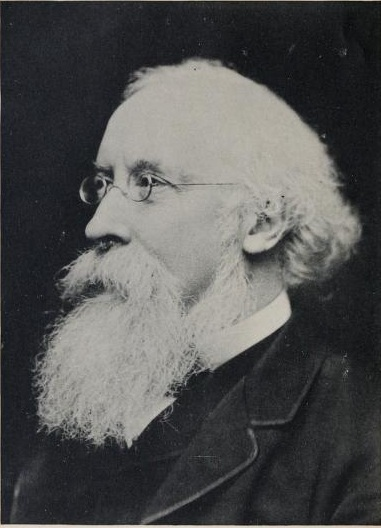
- Whitley Stokes. — Dá Derga's Hostel (Émile Bouillon 1902)
- Born: 28 February 1830; Dublin, Ireland
- Died: 13 April 1909 (aged 79); London, England
- Occupations: Lawyer, civil servant

Whitley Stokes, CSI, CIE, FBA (28 February 1830 – 13 April 1909) was an Irish lawyer and Celtic scholar.

== Background ==
He was a son of William Stokes (1804–1878), and a grandson of Whitley Stokes the physician and anti-Malthusian (1763–1845), each of whom was Regius Professor of Physic at Trinity College Dublin. His sister Margaret Stokes was a writer and archaeologist.

He was born at 5 Merrion Square, Dublin and educated at St Columba's College where he was taught Irish by Denis Coffey, author of a Primer of the Irish Language. Through his father he came to know the Irish antiquaries Samuel Ferguson, Eugene O'Curry, John O'Donovan and George Petrie. He entered Trinity College Dublin in 1846 and graduated with a BA in 1851. His friend and contemporary Rudolf Thomas Siegfried (1830–1863) became assistant librarian in Trinity College in 1855, and the college's first professor of Sanskrit in 1858. It is likely that Stokes learnt both Sanskrit and comparative philology from Siegfried, thus acquiring a skill-set rare among Celtic scholars in Ireland at the time.

== Career ==
Stokes' handwriting (1890)

Stokes qualified for the bar at Inner Temple. His instructors in the law were Arthur Cayley, Hugh McCalmont Hughes, and Thomas Chitty. Stokes became an English barrister on 17 November 1855, practicing in London before going to India in 1862, where he filled several official positions. In 1865 he married Mary Bazely by whom he had four sons and two daughters. One of his daughters, Maïve, compiled a book of Indian Fairy Tales in 1879 (she was 12 years old) based on stories told to her by her Indian ayahs and a man-servant. It also included some notes by Mrs. Mary Stokes. Mary died while the family was still living in India. In 1877, Stokes was appointed legal member of the viceroy's council, and he drafted the codes of civil and criminal procedure and did much other valuable work of the same nature. In 1879 he became president of the commission on Indian law. Nine books by Stokes on Celtic studies were published in India. He returned to settle permanently in London in 1881 and married Elizabeth Temple in 1884. In 1887 he was made a CSI, and two years later a CIE He was an original fellow of the British Academy, an honorary fellow of Jesus College, Oxford and foreign associate of the Institut de France.

== Celtic scholarship ==
Whitley Stokes is perhaps most famous as a Celtic scholar, and in this field he worked both in India and in England. He studied Irish, Breton and Cornish texts. His chief interest in Irish was as a source of material for comparative philology. Despite his learning in Old Irish and Middle Irish, he never acquired Irish pronunciation and never mastered Modern Irish. In the hundred years since his death he has continued to be a central figure in Celtic scholarship. Many of his editions have not been superseded in that time and his total output in Celtic studies comes to over 15,000 pages. He was a correspondent and close friend of Kuno Meyer from 1881 onwards. With Meyer he established the journal Archiv für celtische Lexicographie and was the co-editor, with Ernst Windisch, of the Irische Texte series. In 1876 Stokes's translation of Vita tripartita Sancti Patricii, along with a written introduction, was published.

In 1862 he was awarded the Cunningham Gold Medal by the Royal Irish Academy.

== Death and reputation ==
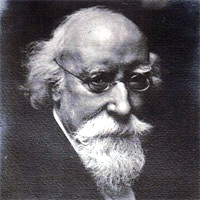
Stokes in old age

Stokes died at his London home, 15 Grenville Place, Kensington, in 1909 and is buried in Paddington Old Cemetery, Willesden Lane, where his grave is marked by a Celtic cross. Another Celtic cross was erected as a memorial to him at St Fintan's, Sutton, Dublin. The Gaelic League paper An Claidheamh Soluis called Stokes "the greatest of the Celtologists" and expressed pride that an Irishman should have excelled in a field which was at that time dominated by continental scholars. In 1929 the Canadian scholar James F. Kenney described Stokes as "the greatest scholar in philology that Ireland has produced, and the only one that may be ranked with the most famous of continental savants".

A conference entitled "Ireland, India, London: The Tripartite Life of Whitley Stokes" took place at the University of Cambridge from 18 to 19 September 2009. The event was organised to mark the centenary of Stokes's death. A volume of essays based on the papers delivered at this conference, The Tripartite Life of Whitley Stokes (1830–1909), was published by Four Courts Press in autumn 2011.

In 2010 Dáibhí Ó Cróinín published Whitley Stokes (1830–1909): The Lost Celtic Notebooks Rediscovered, a volume based on the scholarship in Stokes's 150 notebooks which had been resting unnoticed at the University Library, Leipzig since 1919.

== Works ==
- The Passion: Middle Cornish Poem (1860–1861)
- Three Irish Glossaries (1862)
- Gwreans an Bys: the Creation of the World Translation of William Jordan's 1611 Cornish play (1864)
- Beunans Meriasek The Life of Saint Meriasek Bishop and Confessor (1872) - Editor[Trubner & Co London]
- Three Middle-Irish Homilies (1877)
- Old Irish Glosses at Merzburg and Carlsruhe (1887)
- Irische Texte published at Leipzig (1880–1900), co-editor with Ernst Windisch
- The Anglo-Indian Codes (1887).
- Lives of Saints from the Book of Lismore (1890) translator
- Urkeltischer Sprachschatz (1894) with Adalbert Bezzenberger
- Thesaurus Palaeohibernicus (1901–03) with John Strachan

== Collections ==
In 1910 Stokes' daughters presented University College London with their father's library. The collection spans c.2000 books, many of which contain autograph letters between Stokes and Kuno Meyer, and from other philologists. Stokes' archive also resides at University College London; the 4 box collection comprises his working notes on philology.

== See also ==
- The Meeting on the Turret Stairs
