= Ernst Windisch =

German linguist (1844–1918)

Ernst Wilhelm Oskar Windisch (4 September 1844, Dresden – 30 October 1918, Leipzig) was a German classical philologist and comparative linguist who specialised in Sanskrit, Celtic and Indo-European studies.

In his student days at the University of Leipzig, he became friends with Friedrich Nietzsche. One of his teachers was Friedrich Wilhelm Ritschl. In 1867 he obtained his PhD in classical philology, afterwards teaching at the Thomasschule of Leipzig (1867–1870). In the meantime, he completed his habilitation in Sanskrit and comparative linguistics at the university (1869).

In 1870–71 he worked as a staff member of the India Office Library in London. Later on, he became a professor of comparative linguistics at Heidelberg University (1872) and the University of Strasbourg (1875). In 1877 he returned to his alma mater in Leipzig as a professor of Sanskrit and director of the Indo-Europeanist institute. In the academic year of 1895/96, he served as rector. Among his students were Friedrich Delitzsch as well as Anna Leonowens who attended his Sanskrit lectures from 1897 to 1901. In 1883 he was appointed a full member of the Sächsische Akademie der Wissenschaften zu Leipzig (Royal Saxon Society of Sciences in Leipzig). He became a corresponding member of the Bavarian Academy of Sciences and Humanities in 1905. In the same year, Windisch published his translation of the Old Irish epic Táin Bó Cúailnge into German.

In 1873 he married Berta Roscher, daughter of economist Wilhelm Roscher. The couple had five children, including the theologian Hans Windisch (1881–1935).

== Works ==
- Irische Texte, 4 vols. (1880-1909) with Whitley Stokes

- Irische Texte mit Wörterbuch [Irish texts with dictionary]. Leipzig: S. Hirzel. 1880. [Vol. 1] • Wikisource
- Irische Texte mit Übersetzungen und Wörterbuch [Irish texts with translations and dictionary]. Vol. 2–1. Leipzig: S. Hirzel. 1884.
- Irische Texte mit Übersetzungen und Wörterbuch [Irish texts with translations and dictionary]. Vol. 2–2. Leipzig: S. Hirzel. 1887.
- Irische Texte mit Übersetzungen und Wörterbuch [Irish texts with translations and dictionary]. Vol. 3–1. Leipzig: S. Hirzel. 1891.
- Irische Texte mit Übersetzungen und Wörterbuch [Irish texts with translations and dictionary]. Vol. 3–2. Leipzig: S. Hirzel. 1897.
- Irische Texte mit Übersetzungen und Wörterbuch [Irish texts with translations and dictionary]. Vol. 4–1. Leipzig: S. Hirzel. 1900.
- Irische Texte mit Übersetzungen und Wörterbuch [Irish texts with translations and dictionary]. Vol. 4–2. Leipzig: S. Hirzel. 1909.

- "Compendium of Irish Grammar" (1883 English translation).
- Zwölf Hymnen des Rigveda, mit Sayana's Commentar (1883)
- Māra und Buddha, Leipzig 1895.
- Buddhas Geburt und die Lehre von der Seelenwanderung, Leipzig 1908 – Buddha's birth and the doctrine of the transmigration of souls.
- Iti-Vuttaka, editor
- Das keltische Britannien bis zu Kaiser Arthur, Leipzig 1912 – Celtic Britain up to the time of King Arthur.
- Festschrift (1914).
- Geschichte der Sanskrit-Philologie und indischen Altertumskunde, 2 vols, Leipzig 1917–1920 – History of Sanskrit philology and Indian archaeology.
- Kleine Schriften (2001) edited by Karin Steiner and Jörg Gengnagel.
