= Zeitschrift für celtische Philologie =

- Discipline: Celtic studies
- Language: English, French, German, Italian, Spanish,
- Edited by: Stefan Zimmer, Jürgen Uhlich

Publication details
- History: 1897-present
- Publisher: University of Bonn (Germany)
- Frequency: Irregularly

Standard abbreviations
- ISO 4: Z. Celt. Philol.

Indexing
- ISSN: 1865-889X

Links
- Journal homepage

The Zeitschrift für celtische Philologie is an academic journal of Celtic studies, which was established in 1897 by the German scholars Kuno Meyer and Ludwig Christian Stern. It was the first journal devoted exclusively to Celtic languages and literature and is the oldest significant journal of Celtic studies still in existence today. The emphasis is on (early) Irish language and literature and Continental Celtic languages, but other aspects of Celtic philology and literature (including modern literature) also receive attention.

Apart from Stern and Meyer, previous editors include Julius Pokorny, Ludwig Mühlhausen, Rudolf Thurneysen, Rudolf Hertz, Heinrich Wagner, Hans Hartmann, and Karl Horst Schmidt. The current editors-in-chief are Jürgen Uhlich, Torsten Meißner and Bernhard Maier.

In addition to the regular volumes, the journal also has a subsidiary series, Buchreihe der Zeitschrift für celtische Philologie.

The journal features in a poem by Flann O'Brien which satirises scholars who "rose in their nightshift / To write for the Zeitschrift".
