= Ériu (journal) =

- Discipline: Irish studies, Celtic studies
- Language: English, Irish
- Edited by: Liam Breatnach, Damian MacManus

Publication details
- History: 1904 to present
- Publisher: Royal Irish Academy (Ireland)
- Frequency: Annually

Standard abbreviations
- ISO 4: Ériu

Indexing
- ISSN: 0332-0758 (print); 2009-0056 (web)
- LCCN: 05035766
- OCLC no.: 728293147

Links
- Journal homepage

Ériu is an academic journal of Irish language studies. It was established in 1904 as the journal of the School of Irish Learning in Dublin. When the school was incorporated into the Royal Irish Academy in 1926, the academy continued publication of the journal, in the same format and with the same title. Originally, the journal was published in two parts annually, together making a volume, but parts slipped further apart after Volume III. Articles are written in either Irish or English.
