= Irish studies =

Interdisciplinary field of research

Irish studies is an interdisciplinary field of research devoted to the study of Ireland, the history, geography, culture, literature, art, languages, politics and of Irish people in Ireland and elsewhere. It is sometimes subsumed within the category of Celtic studies and European studies.

In 2018, the Irish government launched a Global Ireland initiative which was designed to promote all aspects of Ireland, including culture, diplomacy and business, internationally. This supplemented the Culture Ireland initiative which was established in 2005.

== Centres ==
There are a number of academic centres devoted to research and teaching in Irish Studies throughout the world.

=== Ireland ===
Each of the universities in Ireland has particular expertise in aspects of Irish studies.

- Belfast
  - Queen's University Belfast: Institute for Irish Studies was established in 1965. It offers a MA Irish Studies. This university also hosts the Seamus Heaney Centre which promotes all aspects of creative writing.
  - Ulster University: expertise in Irish and Celtic studies and in Ulster Scots studies.
- Cork (city)
  - University College Cork: CELT (Digital Humanities Resource for Irish history, literature and politics) and offers a Certificate in Irish Studies
- Dublin
  - Dublin City University: School of Irish offers degrees in Irish studies
  - Dublin Institute for Advanced Studies, a research institute established in 1940. It has a School of Celtic Studies which conducts research into aspects of Irish studies and publishes the academic journal Celtica.
  - Technological University Dublin: Centre for Irish Studies
  - Trinity College Dublin: Department of Irish and Celtic Studies offers various full-time and part-time courses. The TCD Centre for New Irish Studies hosts the Making Ireland College Research Theme.
  - University College Dublin: School of Irish, Celtic Studies and Folklore offers a Masters in Irish Studies as well as other courses.
- Galway
  - University of Galway: College of Arts, Social Sciences and Celtic Studies hosts a Centre for Irish Studies. It offers a range of course including an undergraduate programme in Modern Irish Culture Studies (Literature & Music)‌, a graduate programme in Irish Studies and an on-line Diploma in Irish Studies.
- Limerick
  - University of Limerick: Irish World Academy of Music and Dance hosts the Global Irish programme
  - Mary Immaculate College: Institute of Irish Studies
- Maynooth
  - Maynooth University: School of Celtic Studies which includes the Department of Old Irish, the Department of Modern Irish, the Centre for Irish: Research, Teaching and Testing and Irish Cultural Heritage. It offers various teaching programs for undergraduate, postgraduate, international students and University staff.

=== Britain ===
- England
  - University of Liverpool: Institute of Irish Studies
  - London Metropolitan University: Archive of the Irish in Britain in its Special Collections.
  - University of Manchester: Research Centre for Postcolonial and Irish Studies
  - King's College London: Modern British & Irish Literature
  - University of Cambridge: Modern Irish History.
  - University of Oxford: MSt Celtic Studies
- Scotland
  - University of Aberdeen: Research Institute of Irish and Scottish Studies
  - University of Glasgow: Centre for Scottish and Celtic Studies which includes expertise in Irish studies. A Chair of Celtic Studies was established there in 1956 followed by a Chair of Gaelic Studies in 2010.
  - University of Edinburgh: Irish history group.
- Wales
  - University of Aberystwyth: Department of Welsh and Celtic Studies offers courses in Irish language and literature.

=== Rest of Europe ===
From the 16th century onwards a chain of Irish Colleges was established across Europe for the education of Irish Catholic priests and laity. The earliest of these was in Lisbon and over 30 more colleges followed. With the opening up of higher education in Ireland, these colleges closed but remnants include St Anthony's College, Leuven and the Irish College in Paris.

There is continuing interest in Irish studies across Europe reflecting the long engagement of Ireland with the continent.

- Austria
  - University of Vienna: Centre for Irish Studies
- Belgium
  - Irish College Leuven was established in 1955 to promote education and research in international affairs. It collaborates with the Katholieke Universiteit Leuven in the organisation of the Leuven Centre for Irish Studies to promote research in Irish Studies and collaboration with Irish universities.
- Czech Republic
  - Charles University, Prague: Centre for Irish Studies
- Estonia
  - University of Tartu: offers courses in Irish language and culture
- France
  - Rennes 2 University: Études Irlandaises: Réseaux et Enjeux research on the Irish diaspora
  - Sorbonne Nouvelle University Paris 3: Paris Centre for Irish Studies
- Germany
  - University of Flensburg: Centre for Irish Studies
  - University of Würzburg
  - University of Saarland: courses in Irish literature
- Hungary
  - University of Debrecen: Irish Studies Centre
- Italy
  - University of Turin: Centro di Studi Irlandesi di Sassari
- Poland
  - Irish language is taught at three Polish universities - in Lublin, Poznan and Szczecin.
- Russia
  - Irish language and Irish studies courses offered at Moscow, Saint Petersburg and Veronezh Universities.
- Spain
  - University of A Coruña: Instituto Universitario de Estudios Irlandeses
  - University of Extremadura: Center of Irish Studies
  - University of Granada: Centre for Irish Studies
- Sweden
  - Dalarna University: Centre for Irish Studies which publishes the Nordic Irish Studies journal.
  - Uppsala University: research on all periods of Irish language and literature
- Switzerland
  - University of Zurich: The Swiss Centre of Irish Studies @ the Zurich James Joyce Foundation

=== North America ===
With the history of Irish emigration to North America, it is not surprising that there are a number of centers of Irish Studies there.

In the United States there are several centers, especially in the north-east.

- California
  - Loyola Marymount University: minor in Irish Studies
  - University of California, Berkeley: Irish Studies program is housed within the Institute of European Studies.
- Colorado
  - University of Colorado: Centre for British and Irish Studies which offers a joint undergraduate certificate.
- Connecticut
  - Fairfield University: Irish Studies program
  - Quinnipiac University: Ireland’s Great Hunger Institute.
  - Sacred Heart University, Fairfield, Connecticut: minor in Irish Studies and also has a centre in Dingle, County Kerry for intensive study.
- Delaware
  - University of Delaware: Minor in Irish Studies.
- Georgia
  - Emory University: Irish Studies
  - Georgia Southern University: Center for Irish Research and Teaching
  - University of Georgia: Interdisciplinary program in British and Irish Studies
- Illinois
  - DePaul University: Irish Studies
- Indiana
  - University of Notre Dame: Department of Irish Language and Literature; Keough-Naughton Institute for Irish Studies. The university also has the Kylemore Abbey Global Centre which is located in a former Benedictine monastery in the Connemara region in the west of Ireland.
- Massachusetts
  - Boston College: Center for Irish Programs which coordinates its Irish Studies program, the Irish Institute, the Burns Library Irish Collections, Boston College-Ireland in Dublin, and the Gaelic Roots Program. The Burns Library is dedicated to preserving the abundant historical, literary, musical, and artistic heritage of Ireland. There is also a Burns Visiting Scholar in Irish Studies Program.
  - Boston University: Institute for the Study of Irish Culture
  - Bridgewater State University: Irish Studies Minor
  - Harvard University: Department of Celtic Languages and Literatures offers a range of courses in Irish studies and hosts the Henry Lee Shattuck Professor of Irish Studies.
- Minnesota
  - University of St. Thomas: Center for Irish Studies. This center publishes the New Hibernia Review and organises the Lawrence O'Shaughnessy Award for Poetry, as well as the Celtic Collection, which was started back in 1917.
- Missouri
  - University of Missouri-St. Louis: Irish Studies Program
  - Washington University in St. Louis: Irish Literature
- Montana
  - University of Montana: Irish Studies minor; Friends of Irish Studies in the West
- New Jersey
  - Princeton University: Fund for Irish Studies
- New Mexico
  - University of New Mexico: Irish Studies program which offers a range of courses and scholarships.
- New York
  - Columbia University: Irish Studies
  - Fordham University: Irish Studies Department
  - Hofstra University: minor in Irish Studies
  - Iona University: courses in Irish history and literature
  - Le Moyne College: Irish literature minor
  - Molloy University: Irish Studies Institute
  - New York University: Glucksman Ireland House
  - Queens College, City University of New York: Irish Studies
  - St. John's University (New York City): Multicultural and Multiethnic Studies minor students have the opportunity of studying Irish literature and of spending time at the Mary Immaculate College in Limerick.
  - State University of New York at Geneseo: Irish Studies
  - University at Buffalo: Transnational Irish Studies specialism in its English program and hosts the James Joyce Collection, the largest and most distinguished James Joyce collection in the world.
- North Carolina
  - Belmont Abbey College: Irish Studies
  - Wake Forest University: hosts a variety of activities to promote Irish culture and literature. Wake Forest University Press is the largest publisher of Irish poetry in North America. The university also hosts an annual festival to celebrate Irish literature and culture.
- Oklahoma
  - University of Oklahoma: minor in Irish Studies.
- Pennsylvania
  - Saint Joseph's University, Philadelphia: minor in Irish Studies.
  - University of Pittsburgh: minor in Irish Studies.
  - Villanova University: Center for Irish Studies
- Texas
  - University of St. Thomas (Texas): William J. Flynn Center for Irish Studies.
  - University of Texas at Austin: British, Irish and Empire Studies
- Washington, D.C.
  - Catholic University of America: Center for Irish Studies
  - Georgetown University: Global Irish Studies program
- Wisconsin
  - University of Wisconsin–Milwaukee: Centre for Celtic Studies which includes opportunity for intensive study of Irish language and literature.
  - Marquette University: minor in Irish Studies

In Canada there is the Ireland Canada University Foundation which supports research in Irish Studies. There are also several university centres of Irish Studies including:

- Nova Scotia
  - Saint Mary's University (Halifax): an interdisciplinary programme in Irish Studies and hosts the D'Arcy McGee Chair of Irish Studies.
  - St. Francis Xavier University in Antigonish, Nova Scotia: Celtic Studies Department offers courses in Irish language and literature.
- Ontario
  - University of St. Michael's College, Toronto: Celtic Studies Program which offers courses in Irish studies.
  - University of Ottawa: Department of Modern Languages and Literatures offers a Minor in Celtic Studies which includes courses in Irish language and culture.
- Quebec
  - Concordia University, Montreal: School of Irish Studies which offers a Major in Irish studies and the opportunity to do graduate work. The School hosts the Peter O'Brien Visiting Scholar in Irish Studies.

=== South America ===
There is also interest in Irish studies in South America.

- Argentina
  - Universidad del Salvador: Diploma in Irish Studies
- Brazil
  - University of São Paulo: W.B. Yeats Chair of Irish Studies was established in 2009.

=== Australia and New Zealand ===
Again, as a result of emigration to Australia and New Zealand there is considerable interest in Irish studies there.

- Australia
  - University of New South Wales: John Hume Institute in Global Irish Studies hosts the Australian Ireland Fund Chair in Modern Irish Studies. The university also offers a major in Irish Studies which provides an interdisciplinary exploration of Irish history, culture and society over the past two hundred years that takes particular account of Ireland's relationships with Australia and with Europe
  - University of Melbourne: Gerry Higgins Chair in Irish Studies
- New Zealand
  - University of Otago: Centre for Irish and Scottish Studies which hosts the endowed Eamon Cleary Professor of Irish Studies and offers an undergraduate minor in Irish Studies.

=== Asia ===
In Asia, there is growing interest in Irish studies.

- China
  - Beijing Foreign Studies University: launched a multidisciplinary Irish Studies program in 2007.
  - Shanghai Normal University launched its Irish Literature Research Centre, which includes both undergraduate and graduate courses. A part of the program involves an annual two month festival of Irish culture as well as the production of an entire Irish play, in English.
  - Shanghai Institute of Foreign Trade: Centre for Irish Studies
- Japan
  - Waseda University established an Institute of Irish Studies in 2015

=== Africa ===
- Egypt
  - The British University in Egypt: Research Centre for Irish Studies was established in 2020. It aims to be the leading research centre for Irish Studies and all matters Irish in Egypt, the Middle East, and Africa.

== Publications ==
=== Academic journals ===
There are a number of journals devoted to publishing the results of research in Irish Studies. These include:

- Australasian Journal of Irish Studies
- Canadian Journal of Irish Studies
- ÉIGSE: A Journal of Irish Studies
- Estudios Irlandeses - Journal of Irish Studies
- Irish Archives
- Irish Historical Studies
- Irish Political Studies
- Irish Studies Review
- Irish Migration Studies in Latin America
- Irish Studies in International Affairs
- Irish Studies South
- Irish University Review
- New Hibernia Review
- Nordic Irish Studies
- Review of Irish Studies in Europe
- Proceedings of the Royal Irish Academy
- Studia Hibernica: an annual journal of Irish Studies
- Studi Irlandesi: A Journal of Irish Studies

=== Books series ===
The many publishers based in Ireland have extensive lists of books on aspects of Irish Studies. These include:

- Cork University Press
- Irish Academic Press
- University College Dublin Press

There are also several book series by international publishers devoted to aspects of Irish studies. These include:

- Irish Culture, Memory, Place, Indiana University Press
- Irish Studies, Syracuse University Press
- Irish Studies in Europe, European Federation of Associations and Centres of Irish Studies (EFACIS)
- Irish Studies in Literature and Culture, University of Wisconsin Press
- Reimagining Ireland, Peter Lang
- Routledge Studies in Irish Literature, Routledge
- Irish catalogue, University of Chicago Press
- Irish catalogue, Manchester University Press

== Organizations ==
Several organizations have been established in various countries to promote research and collaboration in Irish Studies. There is the European Federation of Associations and Centres of Irish Studies, British Association of Irish Studies, the American Conference for Irish Studies, the Canadian Association for Irish Studies, the French Society for Irish Studies, the Nordic Irish Studies Network, the Spanish Association for Irish Studies, the Society for Irish Latin American Studies, the Brazilian Association of Irish Studies, Irish Studies in Asia, and the Irish Studies Association of Australia and New Zealand.

Internationally, there is the International Association for the Study of Irish Literature and the Society for the Study of Nineteenth-Century Ireland.

In Ireland, there are many relevant organizations including the Irish Women's Writing Network and the Labour History Society.

== See also ==
- List of libraries in the Republic of Ireland
