= Glenmasan manuscript =

15th-century Gaelic vellum manuscript

The Glenmasan manuscript is a late 15th-century Gaelic vellum manuscript in the National Library of Scotland, Edinburgh, where it is catalogued as Adv.MS.72.2.3. It was previously held in the Advocates Library, Edinburgh, where it was classified as Gaelic MS LIII, and transferred to the National Library of Scotland on its foundation in 1925. The compilation contains Scottish Gaelic literary versions of tales of the Ulster Cycle, such as the Táin Bó Flidhais and Oided mac nUisnig (the latter a version of Longas mac nUislenn).

== Date and provenance ==
The manuscript takes its name from an entry on the front leaf, written by the Rev. William Campbell, minister of Kilchrenan, which appears to state that the original compilation was completed at Glenmasan (now Glen Massan or Gleann Masain, on the Cowal peninsula in the parish of Dunoon, Argyll) in the year 1268. Based on the alternation of the spelling ao and ai for the same diphthong, Donald MacKinnon assigns a date no later than the end of the 15th century and suggests that the manuscript may well have been a first-hand copy of this early 13th-century exemplar. The presence of older linguistic features in the texts points to even earlier strata of writing. MacKinnon therefore proposes the scenario that an early Irish manuscript may have reached Argyll before c. 1238, that about this time, a reworked version was produced, and that the surviving manuscript represents a transcript of the latter made sometime before 1500. A late, anonymous hand on folio 19 wrote Leabhar Echdra ata ann so ar a scriobha le Eoin M'Tavis, "This is a book of adventures written by John M'Tavish", a name which recurs a few times elsewhere in the manuscript and fits the Argyll provenance of the text. He may have been the principal scribe, although there is no way of verifying this claim.

== History ==
The earliest history of the manuscript is unknown; it was possibly written in Ireland but entered Argyllshire not long after its creation. Marginal notes rather than external documentation shed some light on its earliest known stages. At the bottom of folio 9 occurs the name of one 'Robert Campbell at Glensluan' (Argyll), who has been identified as a forester in Cowal (Argyll) and a poet, also known as Forsair Choire an t-Sìth (ca. 1650-ca. 1715), who composed an ode to congratulate Edward Lhuyd on his Archæologia Britannica (1707, printed there) and has a further song published in the Eigg Collection. Rev. William Campbell, Robert's probable great-nephew and minister of Kilchrenan (since 1745) and Dalavich, is named on folio 16 as having been the one-time owner of the book and so may have acquired it through his grand-uncle. Another explicitly named owner (before 1782) is James McIntyre of Glenoe.

The manuscript appeared in a brighter light in the late 18th century, when the Committee of the Royal Highland and Agricultural Society of Scotland requested proof that the Ossian published by James Macpherson was a translation from genuinely ancient Scottish Gaelic poetry. After the death of Rev. William Campbell in 1793, the manuscript seems to have found its way back to Kilmodan, the parish of his birth. Here Sir William MacLeod Bannatyne found it in the hands of the Rev. John Mackinnon (1753–1803), who said that he had acquired it from people in his neighbourhood. Bannatyne passed the manuscript on to the Highland Society of Scotland, whose minutes record that it was laid before the Ossian Committee in March 1799. Donald MacKinnon suggests that were it not for the controversy over Macpherson, the manuscript might never have come to light.

A transcript was first made by Ewen MacLachlan (1773–1822) in his Leabhar Caol ("Narrow Book", National Library of Scotland Adv.MS.72.3.5). Donald MacKinnon published a diplomatic edition with facing translation in the first four volumes of The Celtic Review (1904–1908), which can also be accessed electronically.

== Features ==
The manuscript contains 27 leaves in large quarto format, including the two forming the cover. The pages are written in double columns of 38, sometimes 39 lines each. The binding is anomalous at the beginning: the folio which now comes 3rd should have been the 5th, while a gap exists between the 4th and 5th leaf, possibly between the 5th and 3rd and possibly also between the 3rd and 6th folios.

== Contents ==
Texts include:

- Oided mac nUisnig "The deaths of the sons of Uisnech" (a version of Longes mac n-Uislenn);
  - MacKinnon, Donald, ed. tr. in Celtic Review 1 (1904–05): 12–7, 104–31 (diplomatic edition)
  - Cameron, A., ed. and tr. "Deirdre and the Sons of Uisneach." Reliquiae Celticae 2 (1894): 421–74 (based on Glenmasan MS and Edinburgh, Adv. MS 56).
- Fochonn loingse Fergusa maic Roig "The cause of the exile of Fergus mac Roig". Celtic Review 1 (1904–05): 208–29. Cf: the Book of Leinster version, ed. and tr. Vernam Hull, "The Cause of the Exile of Fergus Mac Roig – Fochond Loingse Fergusa meic Roig." ZCP 18 (1930): 293–8.
- Toraigecht Tána Bó Flidaise (also Toruigheacht bó Flidais), a version of Táin Bó Flidhais. Celtic Review 4 (1907–08): 104–21, 202–19.

== See also ==
- Book of the Dean of Lismore
- Islay Charter
- Fernaig manuscript

== Sources ==
=== References ===
- Images of the manuscript on the website of the National Library of Scotland: Adv.MS.72.2.3 – Glenmasan manuscript – Gaelic manuscripts of Scotland – National Library of Scotland (nls.uk)
- MacKinnon, Donald. "The Glenmasan manuscript."
  - The Celtic Review 1 (1904–05): 12–17, 102–31, 208–29, 296–315. Available from the Internet Archive (incomplete).
  - The Celtic Review 2 (1905–06): 20–33, 100–121, 202–23, 300–313. Available from the Internet Archive
  - The Celtic Review 3 (1906–07): 10–25, 114–37, 198–15, 294–317. Available from the Internet Archive
  - The Celtic Review 4 (1907–08), 10–27, 104–21, 202–19. Available from the Internet Archive
  - Scans also available from Am Baile.
  - Electronic edition available at CELT, University College, Cork
  - English translation by MacKinnon available at CELT, University College, Cork
- MacKinnon, Donald. A Descriptive Catalogue of Gaelic Manuscripts in the Advocates' Library, Edinburgh, and elsewhere in Scotland. Edinburgh, 1912. 158–62. Available from the Internet Archive

=== Further reading ===
- Manuscript catalogues:
  - Mackechnie, John. Catalogue of Gaelic Manuscripts in Selected Libraries in Great Britain and Ireland. Vol. I. Boston, 1973.
  - Yeo, E.D. Summary Catalogue of the Advocates' Manuscripts. National Library of Scotland. Edinburgh, 1971.
