= William Matheson (scholar) =

Scottish Gaelic scholar and academic

- Born: 25 August 1910; Malaclete, North Uist, Harris, Outer Hebrides, Scotland
- Died: 30 November 1995 (aged 85)
- Education: Boroughmuir High School; Inverness Royal Academy
- Alma mater: University of Edinburgh
- Occupations: Gaelic scholar, academic, and ordained minister
- Relatives: Angus Matheson (brother)

William Matheson (Gaelic: Uilleam MacMhathain, 25 August 1910 - 30 November 1995) was a Scottish Gaelic scholar, academic, and ordained minister of the Church of Scotland.

== Early life ==
William Matheson was born on 25 August 1910 in Malaclete, North Uist in the Outer Hebrides, the son of Malcolm Matheson, a missionary in the United Free Church and Mary Murray from Lewis, and was brought up in Sollas there. His brother was Angus Matheson (1912-1962), who became the inaugural Professor of Celtic at the University of Glasgow until his early death.

William was educated at Boroughmuir High School in Edinburgh and transferred to Inverness Royal Academy in 1926, followed by University of Edinburgh from 1929 to 1933, where he took a degree in history.

== Career ==
Matheson worked with Professor W J Watson on the Campbell of Islay manuscripts of Gaelic folktales, and started work on his "magnificent" edition of the poems of John MacCodrum.

Matheson studied at New College, and in 1943 became an ordained minister of the Church of Scotland, after which he served as Tobermory's minister from 1945 to 1952.

The University of Edinburgh's Professor of Celtic, Kenneth Hurlstone Jackson asked him to return to his alma mater to run the teaching of Scottish Gaelic there, and he rose in 1972 to Reader in Celtic.

== Later life ==
Matheson suffered from Parkinson's disease in his later years, and died in Edinburgh on 30 November 1995.
