= Iseabail Ní Mheic Cailéin =

Iseabail Ní Mheic Cailéin, Gaelic noblewoman and poet, fl. 1500. Despite being the ancestor of many members of the Scottish nobility, Iseabail is best known today as the writer of one of the most famous works of erotic poetry in Scottish Gaelic literature.

A daughter of Colin Campbell, 1st Earl of Argyll and Chief of Clan Campbell (died 1493). She married William Drummond, Chief of Clan Drummond. She became the grandmother of David Drummond, 2nd Lord Drummond of Cargill and is the ancestor of the Earls of Perth.

Three poems by Iseabail are preserved in the Book of the Dean of Lismore - Atá fleasgach ar mo thí, Éistibh, a Luchd an Tighe-se and Is mairg dá ngalar an grádh.

Thomas Owen Clancy notes that Éistibh, a Luchd an Tighe-se "is a fairly obscene boast to the court circle on the size and potency of her household priest's penis. The authenticity of the attribution to Iseabail has been questioned, but without substantial grounds."

In a 2017 article about Scottish Gaelic erotic literature, Peter Mackay suggested that Iseabail may have been following the established tradition in Scottish Renaissance literature of exposing, mocking, and criticizing the sexual sins of priests and consecrated religious. Mackay conceded, however, that Iseabail's poem could just as easily be an unashamed celebration of female promiscuity and lust.

== Sources ==
- "Poems from the Book of the Dean of Lismore", Quiggin, Cambridge, 1937.
- "Women Poets in Early Medieval Ireland", Thomas Owen Clancy
- "An Leabhar Mór/The Great Book of Gaelic", ed. Theo Dorgan and Malcolm Maclean, 2008.
