= Gearóid Mac Eoin =

Irish academic (1929–2023)

- Born: 25 January 1929; County Limerick, Ireland
- Died: 11 June 2023 (aged 94); Carrick-on-Suir, Ireland
- Occupations: Lecturer, Professor of Old and Middle Irish and Celtic Philology
- Years active: 1957–1994
- Spouse: Guðrún Helga Hallgrímsdóttir (m. 1959; died 2007)
- Children: 4

Gearóid Mac Eoin (25 January 1929 – 11 June 2023) was an Irish academic whose studies focused especially on aspects of Irish language, literature and history.

== Background and education ==
Gearóid Mac Eoin was born on 25 January 1929. He was educated in Limerick and New Ross, where he attended St Augustine's and Good Counsel College, New Ross. In 1947 he went to National University of Ireland, Galway, on scholarship, took courses in Celtic Studies, archaeology, history and the classical languages, and graduated with an M.A. in 1953. He was then admitted to the University of Bonn, Germany, for a PhD position and obtained his degree in 1955 for a dissertation on "Das Verbalsystem von Togail Troí (H. 2. 17)". Back in Ireland, he found employment as a radio host on RTÉ Radio.

== Dublin, Reykjavik and Uppsala ==
In 1956, Mac Eoin spent a few months working at the Dublin Institute for Advanced Studies (DIAS), but left for Iceland when he accepted a scholarship to study Icelandic language and literature at the University of Iceland. Meanwhile, his position at the Institute was reserved for him, but when in 1957 he returned to Dublin, he obtained a post at the Uppsala University to teach Celtic Languages and Folklore (1957–1959).

While in Reykjavik, he met his future wife Guðrún Helga "Gimma" Hallgrímsdóttir. They married in Uppsala in 1959 and had four children.

== Dublin and Galway ==
Mac Eoin returned to Ireland in 1959 to serve as Professor of Irish at St Patrick's College, Dublin. In 1961, he co-founded Studia Hibernica, an academic journal for Irish studies published by the College, and for a time served at the editorial board (1961–1965). In the 60s, he also became President of Comhar na Múinteoirí Gaeilge, which had just been founded to promote the use of the Irish language at schools, both as a teaching medium and a subject in itself.

In 1963, Mac Eoin began working again for the Dublin Institute, this time as assistant professor. Three years later, he became professor of Old and Middle Irish and Celtic philology at National University of Ireland, Galway, which would become the longest-held position of his career (1966–1994).

Mac Eoin also turned to politics to promote the Irish language. He joined the movement Gluaiseacht Cearta Sibhialta na Gaeltachta in 1969 and by helping to set up local committees in the Gaeltacht area, contributed to the institution of the Údarás na Gaeltachta in 1979.

The Royal Irish Academy made him a member in 1975. As a professor in Dublin and Galway, Mac Eoin and his fellow staff members have been responsible for organising a number of national and international conferences, notably the Sixth International Congress of Celtic Studies (1979). He has been visiting professor at a number of German universities, namely those of Bonn (1979–80), Freiburg (1985) and the Humboldt University of Berlin (1993). Since the late 80s, he has also been busy organising a programme to foster co-operation between academic institutions in Europe. The number of universities enrolled in this programme, which falls under the Erasmus Programme of the European Union, has swollen to 22 today.

Mac Eoin retired in 1994, after nearly 30 years of service as professor in Galway. Gimma, his wife, died in 2007, survived by their children and nine grandchildren. He lived in Barna until his death on 11 June 2023, at the age of 94.

== Publications ==
Mac Eoin's published work includes numerous articles in journals and books (see below). He wrote reviews for journals such as Studia Hibernica, Celtica, Zeitschrift für celtische Philologie, Arv: Journal of Scandinavian Folklore, Studia Neophilologica, Béaloideas, Journal of the Royal Society of Antiquaries of Ireland, Journal of the Galway Archaeological and Historical Society and the Journal of the Thomond Archaeological Society. Mac Eoin has also been involved in editorial work for a number of journals and books, such as Studia Hibernica (volumes 1–5); Hereditas: Essays and Studies presented to Professor Séamus Ó Duilearga (with Bo Almqvist and Breandán Mac Aodha), Dublin, 1975; Proceedings of the Sixth International Congress of Celtic Studies, Galway, 1979 (with Anders Ahlqvist and Donncha Ó hAodha), Dublin, 1983; Proceedings of the Third International Conference on Minority Languages, (with Anders Ahlqvist and Donncha Ó hAodha), Clevedon, 1986; Celtic Cultures Newsletter (UNESCO), Nos. 2–6, Galway; and Cattle in Ancient Ireland, Kilkenny, 1989 (with Etienne Rynne).

- Das Verbalsystem von Togail Troí. Tübingen: Max Niemeyer Verlag, 1960.
- "Das Verbalsystem von Togail Troí (H. 2. 17)." Zeitschrift für celtische Philologie 28 (1960): pp. 73–136, 149–223
- "The Date and Authorship of Saltair na Rann." Zeitschrift für celtische Philologie 28 (1960): pp. 51–67.
- "Dán ar Chogadh na Traoi." Studia Hibernica 1 (1961): pp. 19–54.
- "Smaointe ar Stair Litríocht na Meán-Ghaeilge." Irisleabhar Mhá Nuad (1961): pp. 39–44
- "Dán Lochlannach ar Chath Chluain Tairbh." Dóchas 1 (1961): pp. 16–17.
- "The Invocation of the Forces of Nature in the Loricae." Studia Hibernica 2 (1962): pp. 212–7.
- "Nóta ar abairtí mar 'Dochtúir is ea Seán'." An tUltach (Feabhra 1962): pp. 12–13.
- "Some Icelandic loricae." Studia Hibernica 3 (1963): pp. 143–54.
- "Gleann Bolcáin agus Gleann na nGealt." Béaloideas 30 (1962): pp. 105–20.
- "On the Legend of the Irish Origin of the Picts." Studia Hibernica 4 (1964): pp. 138–54.
- "A Poem by Airbertach mac Cosse." Ériu 20 (1966): pp. 112–139.
- "Ein Text von Togail Troí." Zeitschrift für celtische Philologie 30 (1967): pp. 42–70.
- "Mise Raifteirí." Éigse 12 (1967): pp. 229–32.
- Various entries on Irish literature in A New Catholic Encyclopedia. Washington, 1967.
- "The Mysterious Death of Loegaire macc Néill." Studia Hibernica 8 (1968): pp. 21–48.
- "Contemporary Irish Literature." In Brian Ó Cuív (ed.), A View of the Irish Language. Dublin, 1969. pp. 57–69.
- Obituary of Rudolf Hertz, in Lochlann 4 (1969): pp. 304–5.
- Foreword to the facsimile edition of Edward O'Reilly, A Chronological account of nearly Four Hundred Irish Writers. Shannon, 1970.
- A translation from Icelandic: Gabriel Turville-Petre, "The Poetry of the Scalds and of the Filid." Ériu 22 (1971): pp. 1–47. Original article published as "Um dróttkvaeđi og írskan kveđskap." Skírnir 128 (1954): pp. 31–55.
- "Genitive Forms for Nominative in Irish." Zeitschrift für celtische Philologie 33 (1974): pp. 58–65.
- "The etymology of Irish coí 'cuckoo'." Zeitschrift für celtische Philologie 33 (1974): p. 66.
- "An Early Life of Cumaine Fota." In Bo Almqvist, et al. (ed.), Hereditas: Essays and Studies presented to Séamus Ó Duilearga. Dublin, 1975. pp. 192–205.
- "The Lament for Cumaine Fota." Ériu 28 (1977): pp. 17–31.
- "The Craggaunowen Crannog: Gangway and Gate-Tower, II. Some literary Evidence on Crannóg Structure." North Munster Antiquarian Journal 20 (1978): pp. 52–56.
- "Suithchern and Rónán Dícolla", Zeitschrift für celtisch Philologie 36 (1978): pp. 63–82.
- "Observations on Saltair na Rann." Zeitschrift für celtische Philologie 39 (1982): pp. 1–28.
- "The Death of the Boys in the Mill." Celtica 15 (1983): pp. 60–64.
- "Linguistic Contacts in Ireland." In S. Ureland (ed.), Die Leistung der Strataforschung und der Kreolistik: Typologische Aspekte der Sprachkontakte: Akten des 5. Symposiums über Sprachkontakt in Europa. Mannheim and Tübingen, 1982. pp. 227–35.
- "Treise sa Ghaeilge agus sa Bhéarla." In Seosamh Watson (ed.), Féilscríbhinn Tomás de Bhaldraithe. Dublin, 1986. pp. 27–35.
- "Notes on the Irish terms tlú and tlú garmaint." Ulster Folklife 32 (1986): pp. 33–6.
- "The Celticity of Celtic Ireland." In Karl Horst Schmidt (ed.), Geschichte und Kultur der Kelten. Heidelberg, 1986. pp. 161–73.
- "The Decline of the Celtic Languages." In Gordon MacLennan (ed.), Proceedings of the First North American Congress of Celtic Studies. Ottawa, 1988.
- "Orality and Literacy in some Middle-Irish King-Tales." In Stephen Tranter, et al. Mündlichkeit und Schriftlichkeit in der frühen irischen Literatur. Tübingen, 1989. pp. 149–83.
- "Irish." In Martin Ball (ed.), The Celtic Languages. London, 1993. pp. 101–44.
- "The Irish metrical term laíd." In Roland Bielmeier, et al. (ed.), Indogermanica at Caucasica: Festschrift für Karl Horst Schmidt zum 65. Geburtstag. Berlin, 1994. pp. 375–84.
- "The Interpolator H in Lebor na hUidre." In J. P. Mallory, et al. (ed.), Ulidia: Proceedings of the First International Conference on the Ulster Cycle of Tales. Belfast, 1994. pp. 39–46.
- "Satire in Middle Irish Literature." In Folke Josephson (ed.), Celts and Vikings: Proceedings of the Fourth Symposium of Societas Celtologica Nordica. Göteborg, 1997. pp. 9–25.
- "The briugu in early Irish society." Zeitschrift für celtische Philologie 49–50 (1997): pp. 482–93.
- "Literacy and Cultural Change in Early Ireland." In Christine Ehler, et al. (ed.), Verschriftung und Verschriftlichung: Aspekte des Medienwechsels in verschiedenen Kulturen und Epochen. Tübingen, 1998. pp. 99–131.
- "Old Irish briugu 'hospitaller' and connected words." Celtica 23 (1999): pp. 169–73.
- "The original Name of the Viking Settlement at Limerick." In Séamas Ó Catháin (ed.), Northern Lights: Essays in honour of Bo Almqvist. Dublin, 2001. pp. 165–77.
- "The Four Names of St Patrick." In Michael Richter, et al. (ed.), Ogma: Essays in Celtic Studies in honour of Próinséas Ní Chatháin. Dublin, 2002. pp. 300–11.
- "Crosántacht Íorónta, a Cúlra agus a hÚdar." In Pádraig Ó Héalaí, et al. (ed.), Téada Dúchais: Aistí in ómós don Ollamh Breandán Ó Madagain. Inverin, 2002. pp. 111–20.
- "Cár scríobhadh Leabhar na Nuachongbhála?" In Breandán Ó Conaire (ed.), Aistí ag iompar Scéil: In ómós do Shéamus P. Ó Mórdha. Dublin, 2004. pp. 285–99.
- "The Suffix –aire in Irish Personal Names." In Bernadette Smelik, et al. (ed.), A Companion in Linguistics: A Festschrift for Anders Ahlqvist on the occasion of his sixtieth birthday. Nijmegen, 2005. pp. 152–6.
- "Kathleen Mulchrone – Cáit." In Brian Ó Catháin (ed.), Léachtaí Choilm Chille. Maynooth, 2005.
- Several biographical entries in The Encyclopedia of Language and Linguistics. London, 2005.
- "Irish súgán / English suggane 'hay rope'." In Mícheál Ó Flaithearta (ed.), Proceedings of the conference of Societas Celtologica Nordica. Uppsala, 2007.
- "On re-reading Carney's Studies in Irish Literature and History." In Ailbhe Ó Corráin and Jan Erik Rekdal, Proceedings of the Eighth Symposium of Societas Nordica-Celtica, Uppsala, 2007. pp. 85–94.
- "What language was spoken in Ireland before Irish?" In The Celtic Languages in Contact: Papers from the workshop within the Framework of the XIII International Congress of Celtic Studies. Bonn, 26—27 July 2007.
