= Robert O'Driscoll (writer) =

Irish writer

- Born: 1938; Newfoundland, Canada
- Died: February 29, 1996 (aged 57–58); Ireland
- Citizenship: Canada, Ireland
- Education: University of London
- Occupations: writer, professor
- Writing career
- Language: English

Robert O'Driscoll (1938 – 29 February 1996) was an Irish writer, English professor at St. Michael's College, University of Toronto and visiting lecturer at University College Dublin.

== Biography ==
O'Driscoll was keen to promote Irish studies and founded Canadian Association for Irish Studies (CAIS) in 1973. He studied at University of London.

== Literary works ==
- The Celtic Consciousness. George Braziller, Inc. 1982. ISBN 978-0807611364.
- The New World Order & the throne of the Antichrist. King Arthur Publications. 1993. OCLC 34559880.
- Symbolism and Some Implications of the Symbolic Approach: W. B. Yeats During the Eighteen-nineties. 1975. ISBN 978-0851052700.
- An ascendancy of the heart. Dolmen Press. 1976. ISBN 978-0851053172.
- Atlantis Again - The Story of a Family, with Elizabeth Elliott, 1993, ISBN 978-0969630616.
- New World Order, Corruption in Canada, with Elizabeth Elliott, Saigon Press, Toronto, ON, 1994
