= Roibeard Ó Maolalaigh =

Irish linguist

Roibeard Ó Maolalaigh FRSE
- Born: 1966 (age 59–60); Dublin, Ireland
- Occupations: Linguist; celtologist; academic

Academic background
- Education: University College Dublin; University of Edinburgh
- Thesis: The Historical Short Vowel Phonology of Gaelic (1997)

Academic work
- Discipline: Scottish Gaelic; Gaelic languages
- Institutions: University of Edinburgh; Dublin Institute for Advanced Studies; University of Glasgow

Roibeard Ó Maolalaigh FRSE is an Irish linguist, celtologist, academic and Chair of Gaelic at the University of Glasgow.

== Early life and education ==
Roibeard Ó Maolalaigh was born in 1966 in Dublin, Ireland. He earned a BA Hons and an MA from University College Dublin in Irish and Mathematics. Subsequently, he was awarded a scholarship to study Scottish Gaelic phonology at the University of Edinburgh, where he completed a PhD on Gaelic historical phonology.

== Career ==
He lectured at the University of Edinburgh from 1993 to 2001, where he set up Ionad na Gaeilge ("the Centre for Irish Studies"). He was assistant professor at the School of Celtic Studies, Dublin Institute for Advanced Studies, between 2001 and 2004 before returning to Scotland in 2005 to take up an endowed chair in Gaelic at the Department of Celtic and Gaelic, University of Glasgow, 2005–10.

He was appointed to the first ever established Chair of Gaelic in Scotland at the University of Glasgow in 2010.

At the University of Glasgow, he has held the following positions:

- Head of Celtic and Gaelic, 2007–10;
- Deputy head of the School of Humanities / Sgoil nan Daonnachdan, 2010–11;
- Head of the School of Humanities / Sgoil nan Daonnachdan, 2012–14;
- Vice Principal and Head of the College of Arts / Colaiste nan Ealain, from 2015 onwards.

He is Director of the British Academy-funded project, Digital Archive of Scottish Gaelic / Dachaigh airson Storas na Gaidhlig, which includes Corpas na Gaidhlig.

In March 2022 he was elected a Fellow of the Royal Society of Edinburgh.

=== Research ===
His research work focusses on Scottish Gaelic, in particular its dialectology, history, terminology and phonology.

== Sources ==
Academic offices
Preceded by none	Professor of Gaelic, University of Glasgow; 2010-Present	Succeeded by Incumbent
