= Fernaig manuscript =

Scottish Gaelic manuscript

The Fernaig manuscript (Scottish Gaelic: Làmh-sgrìobhainn Fheàrnaig or Làmh-sgrìobhainn MhicRath) is a document containing approximately 4,200 lines of verse consisting largely of political and religious themes. The manuscript was composed between 1688 and 1693 by Donnchadh MacRath in Wester Ross (Scottish Gaelic: Ros an Iar) and is notable for the author's unique orthography which is, like the more famous Book of the Dean of Lismore, based upon English, rather than Classical Gaelic, phonetics. Although the manuscript has been studied, "translated" in accordance with correct Gaelic orthography and republished – for the first time in 1923 by Calum MacPhàrlainn – it has been said that it has yet to be reliably interpreted.

In addition to the unusual spelling system used the manuscript is notable for several other reasons. It is the only record of Scottish Gaelic verse which is similar in form and nature to that practised by the Munster Irish poets at the start of the 17th century. It also contains Christian poetry which predate the composition of the manuscript by several centuries and have been described as the only extant examples of religious verse from that period as equivalent examples recorded following Culloden are very sparse. All other remaining records of 17th century Gaelic verse were committed to paper only after surviving for a hundred years or more as oral literature. The manuscript contains 59 pieces with 10 being of unknown authorship, 12 attributed to MacRath himself with a further 17 authors named as responsible for the rest.

Excerpt from the poem "Gillimichells ansr to ye ford lyns (Gille-Mhicheal's Answer to the Foresaid Lines)
Original

is trouh i cheile veg Ri Vlliam
Reine mūnnin and si toirse
Hreig i vi ri dūinoilis
is leish i būrris vi ri boist
No faickig eads cūndoirt ea
Snach burrine ea si toire
Seads loūyh chuirrig mulloid er
No Tih nach vūn da void

MacPhàrlainn's interpretation

Is truagh a' chiall bh'aig Rìgh Uilleam,
Rinn muinghinn anns an t-seòrs,
A thréig a bhi ri duinealas,
Is leis am b'fhuras bhi ri bòsd;
Na'm faiceadh iad-s' an cunnart e,
'S nach b'urrainn e 'san tòir,
'S iad 's luaithe chuireadh mulad air
Na 'n tì nach d'bhuain d'an bhòid.

English

Such poor wit had King William
to find confidence of the kind
that abandons manliness
and leads to leisurely boasting
If they could see the danger in him
and if he could not pursue
how quickly they would cause grief
in that being who honours no oath

The manuscript, in the form of two books, is currently held by the University of Glasgow library. Prior to the university gaining possession the manuscript was held by a Matheson of Fernaig, and was thus named the Fernaig manuscript. It then passed through the hands of Dr Mackintosh-Mackay, Dr W.F. Skene and the Reverend John Kennedy of Arran who finally bequeathed it to Glasgow. The dialect used in the text varies and seems to vary between the formal, literary style and that of the local vernacular. While it is possible that MacRath had some knowledge of Gaelic (both Scottish and Irish) manuscripts written in the literary form, the almost total lack of eclipses present in the text – which are a feature of Irish Gaelic and the main distinction between Scottish and Irish dialects – suggest that the author did not commit anything to paper dictated by an Irish speaker. However the anthology does include pieces by two Irish poets who lived generations before the time of the author and this does point to some degree of familiarity by MacRath with that class of literature. The two books of the manuscript can basically be divided by the general theme of the verse found within them. The first contains mostly religious works of a literary style while the second is more political and colloquial in nature. A considerable number of the words used throughout cannot be found in modern Scottish Gaelic dictionaries but many can be found in Irish Gaelic dictionaries and Shaw's "pan-Gaelic" dictionary.

== See also ==
- Book of the Dean of Lismore
- Islay Charter
- Glenmasan Manuscript
