= Próinséas Ní Chatháin =

Irish scholar (d. 2018)

Ní Chatháin, (Máire) Próinséas MRIA (1936 – 24 November 2018), was an Irish scholar, academic and lexicographer, who made substantial contributions to the Royal Irish Academy's Dictionary of the Irish Language (a dictionary of Old and Middle Irish) and held the position of Professor of Early and Mediaeval Irish at University College Dublin.

== Career ==
Ní Chatháin studied at University College Galway (now University of Galway) under Kathleen Mulchrone, where she received a B.A (1956), received a Travelling Studentship from the National University of Ireland to study in Bonn, and then studied at the University of Edinburgh where she received a PhD in 1966. She was a Scholar at the School of Celtic Studies of the Dublin Institute for Advanced Studies between 1962 and 1965, and twenty-five years later sat on the governing board of that School (1987–88).

She began her teaching career as a visiting lecturer at the University of Pennsylvania and subsequently joined the Old Irish Department of University College Dublin in 1967, where she rose from assistant lecturer to professor over the course of the next twenty years. There she established an interdisciplinary M.Phil. with the historian Professor Francis John Byrne and later was involved in establishing an undergraduate course in Celtic Civilisation.

She held the position of President of the Royal Society of Antiquaries of Ireland from 1997 to 2000. In 2002 she was honoured with a festschrift entitled Ogma: essays in Celtic studies in honour of Próinséas Ní Chatháin, edited by her former colleagues Michael Richter and Jean-Michel Picard.
