= Mutual of America =

Fortune 1000 mutual company

Mutual of America Financial Group
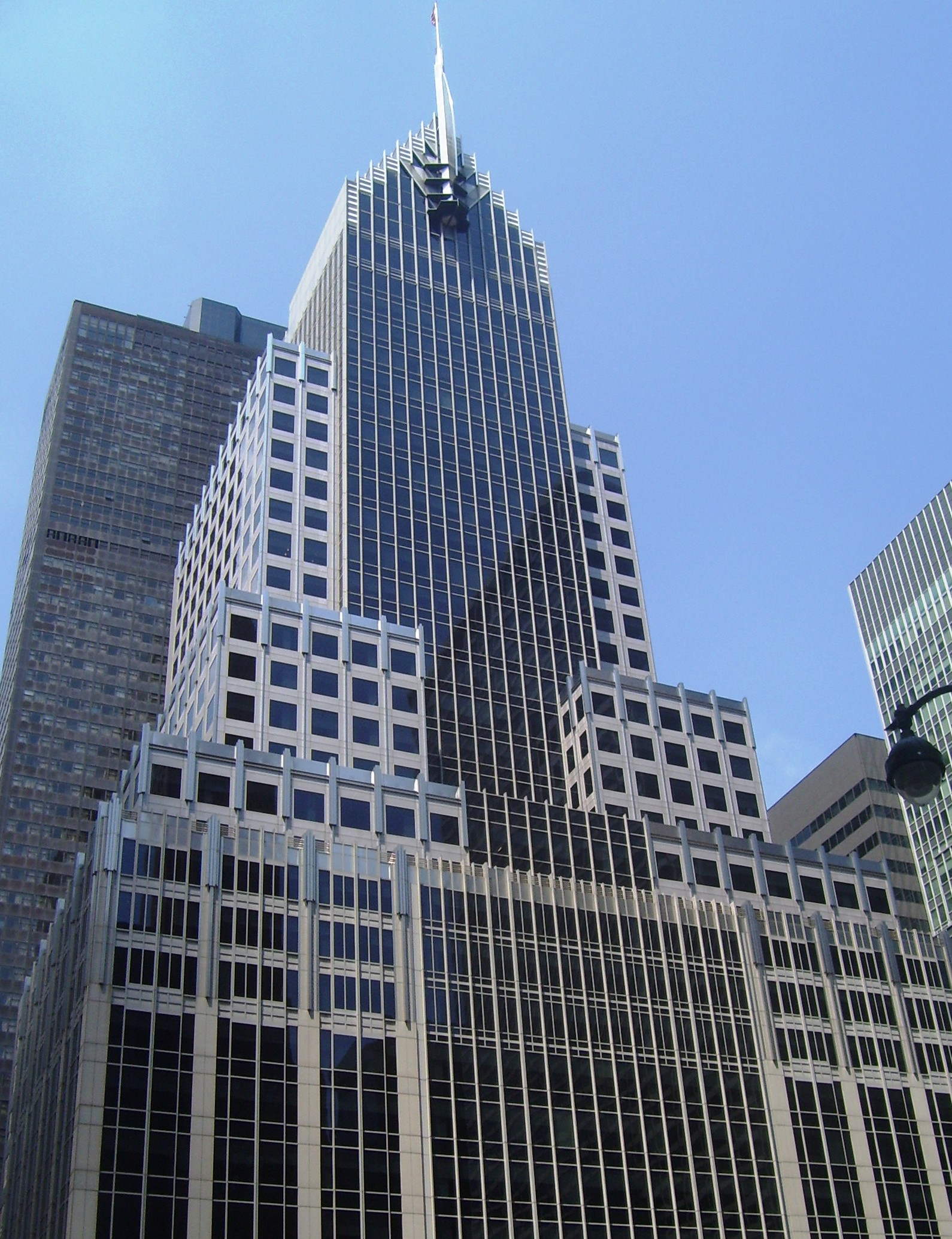
- Mutual of America is headquartered in Midtown Manhattan, New York City
- Type: Mutual
- Industry: Financial services: Retirement
- Founded: 1945
- Headquarters: New York City, United States
- Area served: United States
- Key people: Stephen J. Rich (Chairman, CEO and President)
- AUM: $27.9 billion USD (2025)
- Website: www.mutualofamerica.com

Mutual of America Life Insurance Company is an American provider of retirement products, services and investments to employers, employees and individuals. Founded in 1945, the company provides products and services to help its customers build and preserve assets.

Mutual of America is a Fortune 1000 mutual company headquartered in Manhattan, New York City.

The company had $27.9 billion in total assets under administration and served nearly 500,000 active 401(k) and 403(b) retirement plan participants from nearly 5,000 active clients nationwide, as of December 31, 2025.

Mutual of America has its corporate headquarters at 320 Park Avenue. The company also has a corporate office in Boca Raton, Fla. It has regional offices and affiliate offices throughout the U.S., including in New York City, Atlanta, Chicago, Minneapolis, Philadelphia, Houston, North Carolina and Los Angeles.

== History ==
Mutual of America Financial Group was founded in 1945. It provides retirement products to nonprofit organizations.

In 1976, Mutual of America moved its headquarters to 666 Fifth Avenue. In 1992, Mutual of America bought a 34-story building at 320 Park Avenue in New York from Olympia and York, and turned it into the Mutual of America building. The building's redesign was managed by Swanke Hayden Connell Architects.

In 1971, William Flynn became the president of Mutual of America. He became the CEO the following year, and the chairman in 1982.

In 2005, he became the company chairman emeritus of Mutual of America.

In 1992, Thomas J. Moran was named president of the company, the first person to have been appointed president from within the company. He was named CEO in 1995 and in June 2005, he was appointed chairman of the board. Mutual of America remained profitable during his tenure, including throughout the subprime mortgage crisis.

In 2016, Thomas J. Moran retired as CEO and John R. Greed replaced him, becoming both president and CEO. In 2018, John Greed, who joined the company in 1996, became chairman of the board following Thomas Moran's decision to retire from the company. Thomas Moran was named Chairman Emeritus, a position he held until his death in August 2018.

In July 2024, Stephen J. Rich was appointed chairman of the board and CEO, and in September 2024, he was also named President.

== Products & Services ==
Mutual of America offers a variety of retirement savings and investments. It primarily offers investment products, such as 401(k) plans and 403(b) plans, 457(b) plans, and individual products such as Traditional IRAs and Roth IRAs.

=== Mutual of America Capital Management LLC ===
Capital Management is an SEC-registered investment adviser and an indirect, wholly owned subsidiary of Mutual of America Life Insurance Company. It was formed in 1993 and operates as an investment management company serving institutional clients and an investment adviser to MoA Funds. Capital Management offers portfolio management and investment advisory services to customers in the United States. Its MoA Funds are available to the financial adviser channel and investors outside of Mutual of America's retirement plans.

As of March 2026, Capital Management managed approximately $31 billion and offered 29 funds with an array of asset classes and objectives, including equity, fixed income, international, asset allocation funds and target-date funds.

== Philanthropy ==
=== Community Partnership Award ===
The Mutual of America Foundation Community Partnership Award began in 1996. It is an annual award given for outstanding contributions U.S. nonprofit organizations make to society in partnership with public, private and other social sector organizations.

Hundreds of organizations participate in a national competition each year. In 2023, six organizations were awarded. As of December 2025, 271 partnerships have been recognized. The winning organizations are selected by an independent committee to receive the Community Partnership Award.

The Thomas J. Moran Award is given to the national award-winning program that is improving lives and communities.

The Frances R. Hesselbein Award is given to a partnership that is addressing social challenges and is replicated in more than one community.

=== Breast Cancer Walk ===
Mutual of America was the exclusive Flagship Sponsor for the American Cancer Society’s Making Strides Against Breast Cancer Walk in New York. The walk helps fund research in the fight against breast cancer and the many programs the American Cancer Society offers. Mutual of America has helped raise more than $4 million over the walk’s more than 30-year history.

== Governance ==
=== Board of directors ===
- Chairman of the Board: Stephen J. Rich
- Matthew J. Adams (former Senior Partner, U.S. Insurance Practice Leader)
- Rosemary T. Berkery, Esq. (former Chairman and CEO, UBS Bank USA)
- Gwendolyn Hatten Butler (former President and CIO Capri Investment Group)
- Wayne A.I. Frederick, M.D. (Charles R. Drew Professor of Surgery & Immediate Past President, Howard University, Washington D.C.)
- Robert J. McGuire, Esq. (former NYC Police Commissioner)
- Ellen Ochoa, Ph.D. (former Astronaut and Director of NASA Johnson Space Center)
- Roger B. Porter (IBM Professor of Business and Government at Harvard University)
- Christopher C. Quick (General Partner, Burke & Quick Holdings, LLC)
