= Éistibh, a Luchd an Tighe-se =

Poem composed by Iseabail Ní Mheic Cailéin

Éistibh, a Luchd an Tighe-se, otherwise Listen, People of this House is a poem dated to c. 1500 (see 1500 in poetry), composed by Iseabail Ní Mheic Cailéin, a daughter of Colin Campbell, 1st Earl of Argyll (died 1493).

Thomas Owen Clancy notes that Éistibh, a Luchd an Tighe-se "is a fairly obscene boast to the court circle on the size and potency of her household priest's penis. The authenticity of the attribution to Iseabail has been questioned, but without substantial grounds." "Diplomatic" editions were published in the 20th century, and only in 2008 was the unexpurgated text, with translation, published.

== The text ==
Original text

Estyf, a lucht in ti so,
re skail na bod breour,
dy hantyth mo chreissy
cwt dane skallow dy screyf.

Da leneour bod braiwillycht
dy vy sin amsyr royn,
tak far in nvrd ċrawe so
bod is ċaf mor roynne.

Bod mo haggird horistil
ga ty go fad sessowy^{t},
otha keynn an quhallavir
in reyf ata na vackann.

Atta reyf roiravyr
an sin sne skail breg,
no^{t}cha cholai choyravyr
woa vod arriss es.
Estyve.

Gaelic spelling

Éistibh a luchd an tighe-se
re scél na mbod bríoghmhar
do shanntaich mo chridhe-sa
cuid dana scéalaibh do sgríobhadh.

Cé líonmhor bod bréagh-bhileach
do bhí san aimsir romhainn
tá aig fear an úird chrábhaidh seo
bod as cho mór righinn.

Bod mo shagairt thuarasdail
cé tá cho fada seasmhach
o tha céin ní chualabhair
an reabh atá ina mhacan.

Atá a riabh ro-reamhar
an sin ’s ní h-é scéal bréagach
nocha [chuala] cho-reamhar
mhotha bhod arís. Éistibh.

Translation

Listen, people of this house,
to the tale of the powerful penis
which has made my heart greedy.
I will write some of the tale.

Although many beautiful tree-like penises
have been in the time before,
this man of the religious order
has a penis so big and rigid.

The penis of my household priest,
although it is so long and firm,
the thickness of his manhood
has not been heard of for a long time.

That thick drill of his,
and it is no word of a lie,
never has its thickness been heard of
or a larger penis.

More Fluent Translation

O Hark ye, ye folk of this house,
To this tale of a powerful prick,
With envy, it makes my heart sick.
Now, to write more of this tale ...

Though there’ve been many dicks like a tree,
In times long gone bye, before me,
This prelate has a prick
That’s so high, hard and thick!

My household-priest’s schlong
Is firm, fat, and lasts long.
The like of his member
Hasn’t been heard of for as long as I can remember.

That thick drill of a prick!
Hark ye, I promise, no lies.
Since Fergus’s dick
I’ve never seen one of that size.

== Bibliography ==
- "Poems from the Book of the Dean of Lismore", Quiggin, Cambridge, 1937.
- "Women Poets in Early Medieval Ireland", Thomas Owen Clancy
- "An Leabhar Mór/The Great Book of Gaelic", eds. Theo Dorgan and Malcolm Maclean, 2008.
