= Eva Hanagan =

Eva Hanagan (born Eva Ross; 10 November 1923 – 9 January 2009) was a British literary novelist and teacher of writing. She had seven novels published between 1977 and 1998.

== Early life and education ==
Hanagan was born in Inverness, Scotland to James MacDonald Ross and Janet Alice Ross. The youngest of four children, she grew up in Tarnash. Hanagan was educated at the Inverness Royal Academy, where she regularly appeared in the top five places for her grade, although childhood asthma kept her away from school for extended periods. She was an accomplished pianist and spoke French, German, and Russian.

At age 19, Hanagan ended her education and became involved with the Common Wealth Party, serving as the Highlands branch secretary. The party was based on socialist ideals, which Hanagan embraced throughout her life.

== Career ==
Hanagan joined the Foreign and Commonwealth Office and in March 1946 was posted to Vienna to join the Allied Commission for Austria. She worked in the legal division on the de-nazification of Austrian law and the prosecution of war crimes. Following her experience in Vienna, Hanagan said: "Its never really bright morning again. You see the absolute depth of human depravity".

Hanagan's first publisher was Colin Haycraft at Duckworth Overlook, who declared that "he never had to correct a word of hers." Auberon Waugh described her as the "Jane Austen of the 20th century," though, according to Susan Chitty, writing in The Guardian, her work was "comedy of a darker hue".

Hanagan later developed material for writing classes, tutored writing classes, and led a creative writing program at HM Prison Ford in Sussex. Shw was the first ever writer in residence appointed by the Home office. In addition she was a member of the society of Sussex authors and published texts for the Writers Bureau (1988).

== Personal life ==
Hanagan was married to Major John Hanagan, and as a "service wife," lived in Europe and the Middle East. The couple had two children, Patrick and Alistair.

Eva Hanagan died in London on 9 January 2009.

== Bibliography ==
=== Novels ===
- In Thrall Duckworth (1977 ) Odyssey Press (2016 )
- Playmates Duckworth (1978). Odyssey Press (2017)
- The Upas Tree Constable (1979). Odyssey Press (2017)
- Holding On Constable (1980) Endeavour Press ( 2016)
- A knock at the door Constable (1982). Odyssey Press ( 2017)
- Alice Warner Books (1997). Odyssey Press ( 2016)
- The Daisy Rock Warner Books (1998). Odyssey Press (2017)

=== Short stories ===
- New stories The Arts Council. ( 1976)
- The thirteenth ghost book Barrie and Jenkins (1997)

=== Literary criticism ===
- Handbook on writing a novel The Writers Bureau ( 1988 )
