= Culduthel =

Area of Inverness, Scotland

Coordinates: 57.448°N 4.228°W

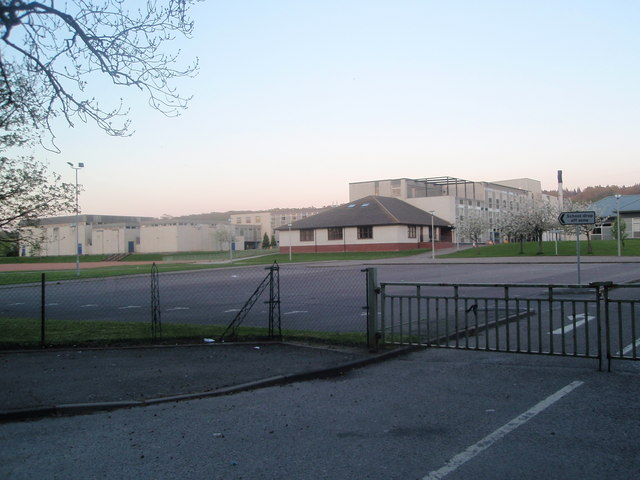
Inverness Royal Academy

Culduthel (Gaelic: Cùil Daothail) is an area in the south of the city of Inverness, in the Highland council area of Scotland. The area is largely residential, and is the location of Inverness Royal Academy.

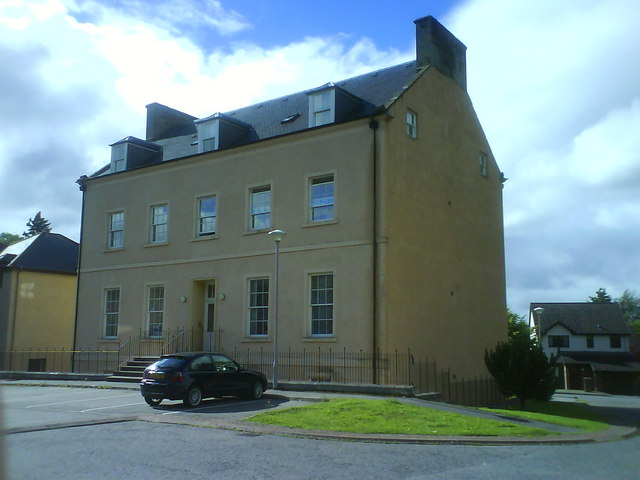
Culduthel House

One historic building is Culduthel House, a former manor house. This building was used as part of Culduthel Hospital, until the hospital was closed in 1989.

Several Bronze Age archeological sites have been found in the area. These include a Clava type cairn and a burial cist.
