= Kathleen Mulchrone =

Irish Celtic scholar

- Born: 22 November 1895; Kilbeggan, County Westmeath
- Died: 13 June 1973 (aged 77); Mullingar

Kathleen "Kate" Mulchrone (Irish: Caitlín Ní Mhaolchróin; 22 November 1895 – 13 June 1973) was an Irish Celtic scholar.

== Biography ==
Kathleen Mulchrone was born in Kilbeggan, County Westmeath on 22 November 1895. She was the youngest of three daughters of RIC sergeant, Patrick Mulchrone originally from County Mayo, and Mary Mulchrone (née Spain) from County Tipperary. She attended primary school in Fore, County Westmeath and then the Loreto Convent in Mullingar. For her results in the leaving certificate examination in 1913, she received a scholarship to attend University College Dublin (UCD). She graduated with a BA in 1916, a H.Dip.Ed. in 1917, and MA in 1918.

Mulchrone was then awarded a travelling studentship to study for a D.Phil. in Bonn, Germany under the supervision of Professor Rudolf Thurneysen. They held each other in great esteem, with some claiming she was his favourite student. She published her postgraduate work on St Patrick in Zeitschrift für Celtische Philologie (1926–1927), which was then published as the book Bethu Phátraic: the tripartite life of St Patrick in 1939. Osborn Bergin wrote that this book was "the best of its kind that has appeared for many years."

Mulchrone taught in a number of institutions, firstly as a Vocational Instructor in Irish with Westmeath County Council from 1925 to 1927, and then in Rathmines Vocational College from 1928 to 1938. She taught at UCD as an assistant lecturer from 1931 to 1938, going on to work in the Irish Manuscripts Commission in the Royal Irish Academy (RIA) from 1928 to 1938. Between 1926 and 1970, she authored or co-authored 14 of the 27 fascicles of the Catalogue of Irish Manuscripts in the RIA. She contributed essays to a number of volumes: Measgra i gcuimhne Mhichíl Uí Chléirigh (1944), Studies in early Irish law (1936), and The Book of Lecan: Leabhar Mór Mhic Fhir Bhisigh Leacain (1937). Her papers were published in scholarly journals such as Studia Hibernica, the Journal of the Galway Historical and Archaeological Society, Irish Ecclesiastical Record, and Celtica.

She was appointed professor of Old and Middle Irish and Celtic philology at University College Galway when then chair was created in 1938, delivering many of her lectures in modern Irish. She would remain in this post until her retirement in 1965. Mulchrone died in her home on Patrick Street, Mullingar on 13 June 1973 and is buried in Ballyglass. The RIA hold a collection of the academic papers.
