= Inverness Royal Academy =

- Acadamaidh Rìoghail

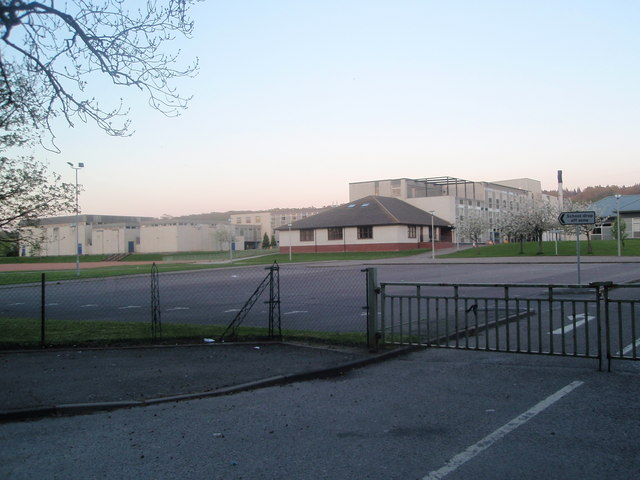
- Rear entrance of now demolished 1977 school building

Location
- Culduthel Road, Culduthel; Inverness, IV2 6RE; Scotland; 57.4486°N 4.2252°W

Information
- Type: Secondary
- Motto: Labore et Virtute (Work and Excellence)
- Established: 1792; 234 years ago
- Local authority: Highland
- Rector: I. Adamson
- Staff: c. 120
- Age: 11 to 18
- Enrolment: c. 1,300
- Language: English, Gaelic
- Houses: Glamaig, Nevis, Slioch, Wyvis, Lomond
- Colour: Royal Blue Gold
- Website: www.invernessroyalacademy.org.uk

Inverness Royal Academy is a comprehensive secondary school in the city of Inverness in the Highland area of Scotland.

A former grammar school with a history dating back to the 13th century, the academy became a comprehensive in the mid-1970s. It has been at its present site in the Culduthel area of the city since 1977.

== Catchment area ==
The school is a six-year comprehensive school serving an extensive area. The associated primary schools are Stratherrick, Aldourie, Cauldeen, Farr, Foyers, Hilton, Holm, Lochardil, Inshes and Bun-sgoil Ghaidhlig Inbhir Nis (Gaelic Primary School Inverness). Children living within the catchment area who attended St. Joseph's and Bishop Eden primaries also transfer there after Primary 7. Parents living outwith the catchment area can request that their children be placed there. At present around one hundred children live outwith the catchment area and attend the academy.

== History ==
Inverness, Stephen's Street, Royal Academy entrance

Tracing its history back to the school established by Dominican Friars in 1223 through the town Grammar School in 1668 to the founding of the academy in 1792, the school has been located at the following locations around the city.

- Friars Street area (Dominican Priory) 1223–1668
- Church Street (now the Dunbar Centre) 1668–1792
- Academy Street (formerly New Street) 1792–1895
- Midmills building (previously of UHI-Inverness College) 1895 - 1980
- Culduthel Road 1977– 2016
- Culduthel Road 2016–present

The school's continuous existence as a developing institution cannot be demonstrated from the surviving evidence, and it is probably safer to interpret that as a succession of educational provisions in and mainly for the burgh, rather than the survival of a single school. There is, however, evidence that concentration on a single site and within a single building was favoured increasingly (as was the pattern elsewhere in Britain and the transatlantic colonies, from which many of the early Academy subscriptions came) in the later eighteenth century, and that the grammar school would be the focus of this, notably during the Rectorship of Hector Fraser, who taught many of the merchants and lawyers involved in the establishment of the Royal Academy, which was from the first an innovative and self-contained project aiming, as its first minute book amply demonstrates, to provide something like a stepping stone to full university status for the burgh, with a curriculum designed in the light of the ideas of the Enlightenment and dominated not by the Classics but by the sciences and mathematics.

For the first quarter-century of the academy's existence something like this ideal was sustained, and the appointments of its Rectors showed a bias towards the emerging sciences - for example that of Alexander Nimmo, who became a disciple of Telford, and left in 1811 to work on civil engineering projects in the West of Ireland. He was followed by a mathematician, Matthew Adam.

The academy was open to girls from the start, and in its English, writing and drawing classes provided the sort of education for girls that middle-class parents were happy with, although there seems also to have been an enthusiasm for geography. In the mid-nineteenth century one girl was adjudged the best mathematics pupil in the school, but could not be awarded the appropriate medal, which went only to boys.

From the opening of the academy in 1792 (when pupils came from all over the Highlands and across the Atlantic, especially the Caribbean - some are shown in the surviving rolls as "coloured") a continuous existence can safely be traced, in which major milestones after 1792 were the adaptation to compulsory schooling after 1872, and the demands of the professions generally, which led to the establishment of the new building on the Crown in 1895.

The school's management was by the Inverness School Board after 1910, and later by Inverness County Council and Highland Regional Council.

On 28 April 1962 when the school's outdoor club was climbing on Stac Pollaidh, a 15-year-old boy slipped and fell 40 feet to his death.

=== Comprehensive ===
There was movement in the 1950s and 1960s (when Gaelic speaking pupils from the Western Isles were still accepted and housed in the Hostel on Culduthel Road) from fee-paying and selectivity to the status of area comprehensive in the mid and late 1970s, based on a new site.

On 26 June 1992 the school was visited by the controversial Prince Andrew, Duke of York to celebrate its bi-centenary, with Lachlan Mackintosh of Mackintosh. On 23 November 2009 his brother, Prince Edward, visited the school, having also visited on 11 June 2003.

== School building ==
The new school building has 4 floors for a variety of subjects. The ground floor has the guidance base, Year head base, 4 technology workshops, P.E classrooms, 2 large games halls, the learning support department as well as the reception in the front, the canteen under the larger atrium and the cafe area under the smaller atrium. The first floor is home to the theatre located above the staircase in the first floor with a drama studio attached. The fitness suite, the dance studio, Geography, History, Modern Studies, Business Studies, Graphic Communication, Engineering Science, Music and Home Economics classrooms. The second Floor has the English, Gaelic, Modern Languages (French, German and Spanish) and Maths classrooms as well as a computer room and 2 unisex toilets. The third floor is home to the Science classrooms (Physics, Biology and Chemistry), the second computer room and Art department with four classrooms.

The school was awarded £46 million in order to construct the new building. The construction commenced in summer 2014 and has since been completed. The pupils moved into the new school on 18 August 2016.

== Notable former pupils ==
=== Grammar school ===
- Seumas Bàn Mac A' Phearsain (James MacPherson) - writer of the works he alleged to be translations of works of the Scottish Bard "Ossian" which had an enormous influence on European literature, and briefly a Government place-holder in Florida

=== Royal Academy ===
- Ellinor Catherine Cunningham van Someren (1915–1988), medical entomologist
- Jane Elizabeth Waterston (1843–1932), (art pupil at the academy): missionary, teacher, and physician, a member (in 1873) of the first-ever group of women physicians trained in London (by Sophia Jex-Blake) and recognised as the first woman doctor in Southern Africa.
- Prof Dame Sue Black (born 1961) DBE OBE, forensic anthropologist
- Jamie Bowie (born 1989), 400m track athlete, 4 × 400 m relay medallist for Team GB at 2014 IAAF World Indoor Championships
- Murdo Fraser, Conservative MSP since 2001 for Mid Scotland and Fife
- Iain Gray, Labour MSP since 2007 for East Lothian and Edinburgh Pentlands from 1999 to 2003
- Edward Strathearn Gordon (1814–1879), created a Lord of Appeal in 1879 with the title Baron Gordon of Drumearn, and twice Disraeli's Lord Advocate.
- Prof G.W.S. Barrow, Sir William Fraser Professor of Scottish History and Palæography from 1979 to 1992 at the University of Edinburgh
- Sir Gordon Beveridge, Vice-Chancellor from 1986 to 1997 of Queen's University Belfast, Professor of Chemical Engineering from 1971 to 1986 at the University of Strathclyde, and President from 1984 to 1985 of the Institution of Chemical Engineers (IChemE)
- Very Rev John Annand Fraser MBE, Moderator of the General Assembly of the Church of Scotland from 1958 to 1959
- James Gordon (1786 - 1865) Upper Canada politician
- Robert Patterson Grant (1814–1892) merchant and Liberal politician in Pictou and Nova Scotia
- Hamish Gray, Baron Gray of Contin, Conservative MP from 1970 to 1983 for Ross and Cromarty, and Lord Lieutenant of Inverness from 1996 to 2002
- Eva Hanagan (1923 – 2009), novelist
- Derry Irvine, Baron Irvine of Lairg, Lord High Chancellor of England and Wales from 1997 to 2003
- Fred Macaulay (1925–2003), BBC broadcaster, and former manager from 1980 to 1983 of BBC Radio Highland
- John A. Mackay, (1889–1983) missionary, ecumenist and Third President of Princeton Theological Seminary
- James David Macdonald (ornithologist)
- Elizabeth MacKintosh, author who wrote under the name Josephine Tey
- Alistair MacLean, novelist
- Ranald MacLean Senator of the Royal College of Justice 1990–2005; one of the judges who sat in the Lockerbie air disaster prosecutions
- Angus Matheson (1912–1962), inaugural Professor of Celtic at the University of Glasgow
- Sir James Matheson (1796–1878), MP for Ross and Cromarty from the 1840s until his death, co-founder of the influential East India-China trading house of Jardine Matheson, and completely frank that his prosperity came from the opium trade.
- William Matheson (1910–1995), Scottish Gaelic scholar, and ordained minister of the Church of Scotland
- Angus Reach (1821–1856), journalist and Academy Treasurer
- Fr Anthony Ross (1917–1993) historian, campaigner for the homeless, and influential penal reformer, and Rector of Edinburgh University 1979
- James Ross (1848–1913) Canadian railway engineer and businessman who carried through the completion of the Canadian Pacific Railway)

Previously listed

- Duncan MacQuarrie MBE, HM Inspector of Schools with national responsibility for Gaelic; campaigner for Gaelic language and culture a former pupil of Oban High School, a distinguished former member of staff but not himself a pupil of the academy.

== See also ==
- Education in Scotland
