= Angus Matheson =

Scottish academic (1912–1962)

- Born: 1 July 1912; Harris, Outer Hebrides, Scotland
- Died: 2 November 1962 (aged 50)
- Education: Inverness Royal Academy; University of Edinburgh
- Occupation: Academic
- Known for: Professor of Celtic at the University of Glasgow
- Spouse: Sylvia Schofield (m. 1941-50)
- Relatives: William Matheson (brother)

Angus Matheson (1 July 1912 – 2 November 1962) was the inaugural Professor of Celtic Languages and Literature at the University of Glasgow, a post he held from 1956 until his death in 1962.

== Early life ==
Angus Matheson was born 1 July 1912 in Harris in the Outer Hebrides to Mary Murray from Lewis and Malcolm Matheson, a minister in the United Free Church. He grew up in Sollas, North Uist. His elder brother was the Gaelic scholar William Matheson, an ordained minister and Reader in Celtic at the University of Edinburgh.

== Career ==
He was educated at Inverness Royal Academy, followed by the University of Edinburgh, where he graduated with an MA with first class honours in Celtic in 1934. He undertook further studies as a McCaig Scholar at University College Dublin, and at the University of Bonn. In 1938, he was appointed as a lecturer in Celtic studies at the University of Glasgow.

He was appointed the inaugural Professor of Celtic Languages and Literature at the University of Glasgow in 1956.

== Personal life ==
On 19 December 1941, he married Sylvia Schofield, the writer and traveller, at Kingston and Surbiton Presbyterian Church. They divorced in 1950. He died on 2 November 1962.
