= Scottish studies =

Interdisciplinary field of research

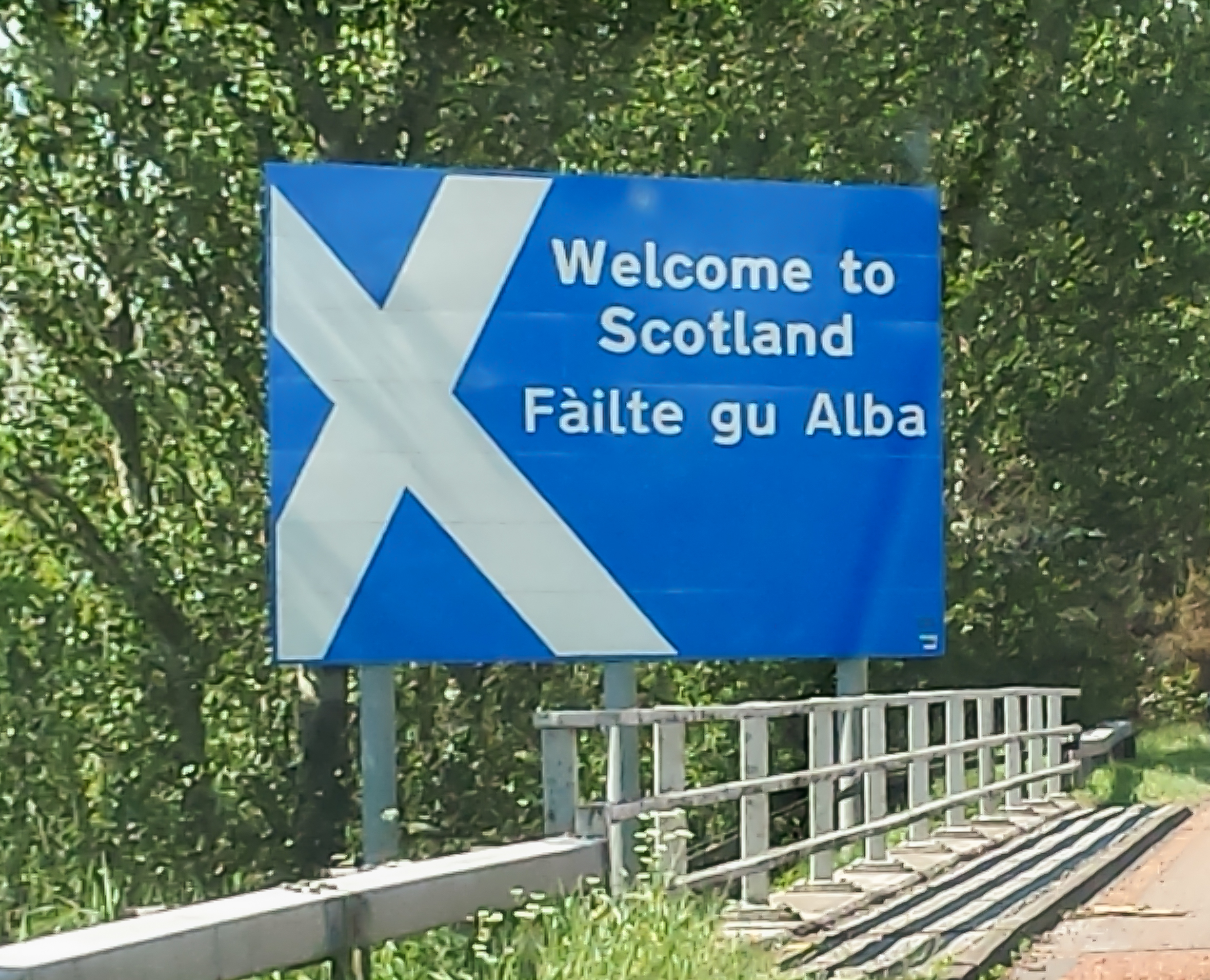
Border sign

Scottish studies is an interdisciplinary field of research devoted to the study of Scotland, History of Scotland, Geography of Scotland, Scottish society, Culture of Scotland, Politics of Scotland, Economy of Scotland, Languages of Scotland, Scottish literature, Gaelic literature and of Scottish people in Scotland and elsewhere. It is sometimes subsumed within the category of Celtic studies and European studies.

== Centers ==
There are a number of academic centers of Scottish Studies which offer a range of degrees. These include:

- Scotland
  - University of Aberdeen: Research Institute of Irish and Scottish Studies
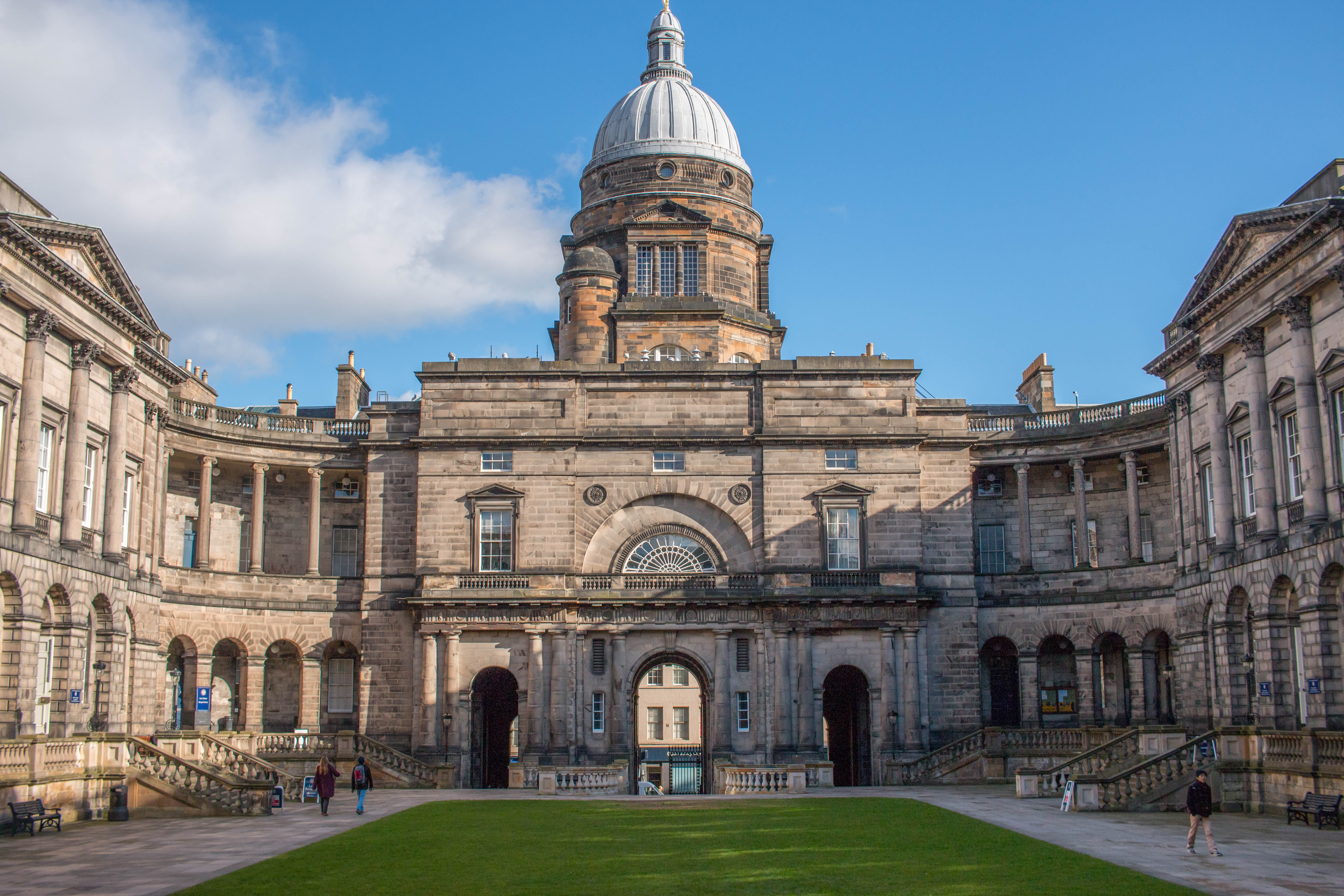
  - The University of Edinburgh.
    University of Edinburgh: Celtic and Scottish Studies; School of Scottish Studies
    - The University of Edinburgh has had the longest-established Celtic department in Scotland.
    - In 1951, the university created the Scottish Studies Archive to store and publish written and digital material about Scotland, including 33,000 audio recordings.
  - University of Glasgow: Centre for Scottish and Celtic Studies. A Chair of Celtic Studies was established there in 1956 followed by a Chair of Gaelic Studies in 2010.
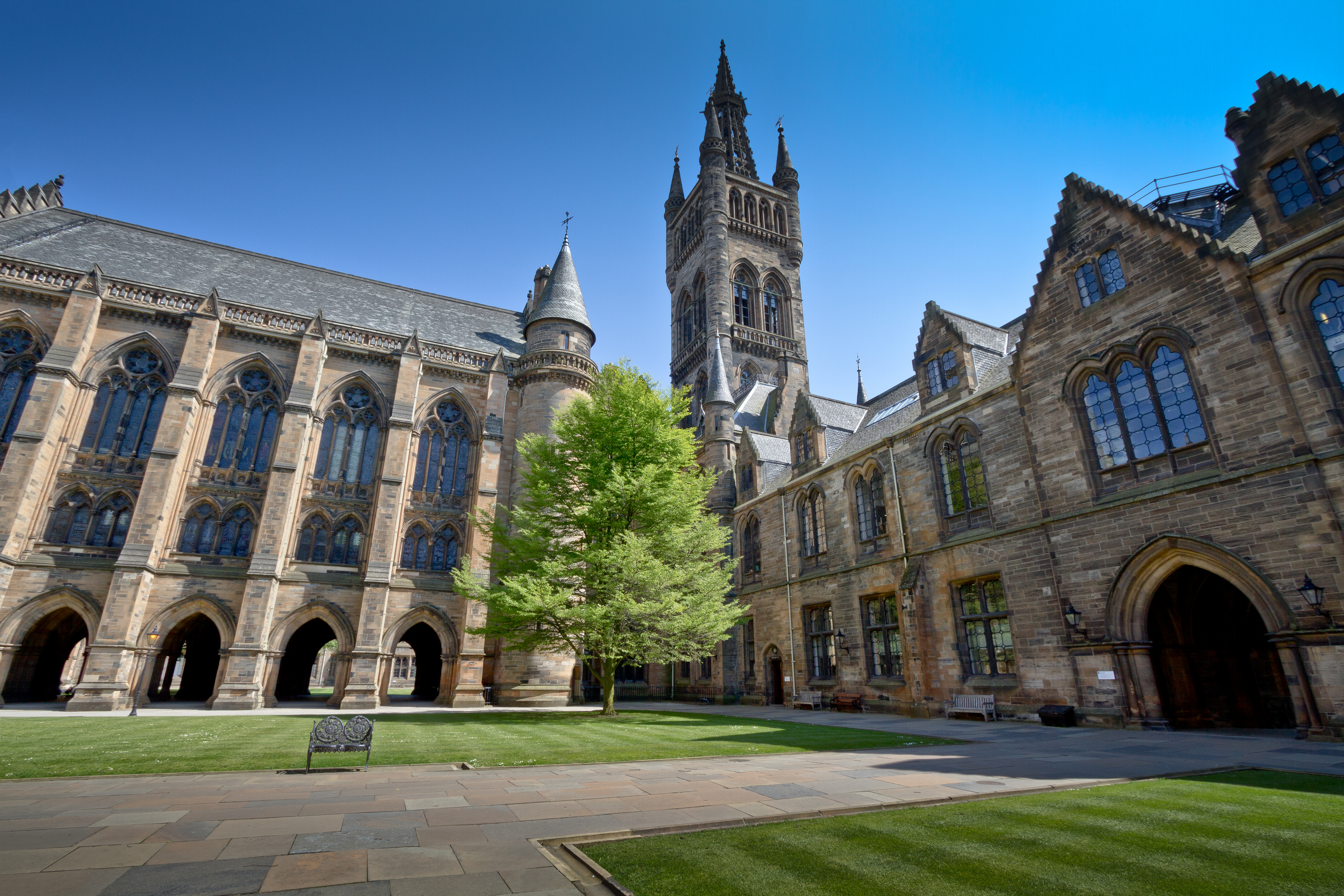
    - The University of Glasgow West Quadrangle.
      The University of Glasgow is the only department focused solely on studying Scottish literature.
  - University of the Highlands and Islands:
    - Institute for Northern Studies
    - Sabhal Mor Ostaig: The National Centre for Gaelic Language & Culture
- Canada
  - McGill University: Chair in Canadian-Scottish Studies
  - University of Guelph: Centre for Scottish Studies
  - Simon Fraser University: Research Centre for Scottish Studies
- United States
  - East Tennessee State University: Appalachian, Scottish, and Irish Studies
- New Zealand
  - University of Otago: Centre for Irish and Scottish Studies

It is also possible to obtain a Scottish Studies degree at secondary schools.

== Journals ==
- International Review of Scottish Studies
- Scottish Studies
- Journal of Irish and Scottish Studies
- Journal of Scottish Historical Studies
- Studies in Scottish Literature

== Organizations ==
- The Scottish Studies Foundation is a charitable organization advancing the study of Scottish culture and history.
- The Eighteenth Century Scottish Studies Society is an interdisciplinary and international group of members studying 18th-century Scottish society and culture.
- The French Society of Scottish Studies promotes research on Scotland within the French academic world through gatherings and partnerships between its members and Scottish scholars throughout the world.
- The International Association for the Study of Scottish Literatures is the official global association and a charity promoting Scottish literature in Gaelic, Scots, English and Latin internationally.
- The Association for Scottish Literary Studies is a charity founded in 1970 to advance the teaching, studying and writing of Scottish literature.
- Area studies
