= Sylvia Schofield =

British writer and traveller (1916-2006)

- Born: Sylvia Anne Terry-Smith; 28 May 1916; London, England
- Died: 2 March 2006 (aged 89); Javea, Spain
- Education: Wimbledon Technical College
- Occupations: Writer and traveller
- Spouses: Angus Matheson (m. 1941–1950) Henry Beaumont Schofield (m. 1956–1990)

Sylvia Anne Schofield FRGS (née Terry-Smith; 28 May 1916 – 2 March 2006) was a British writer and traveller. She had a long and varied career, and her The Daily Telegraph obituary described her as, "an agony aunt, wartime intelligence operative, honorary colonel in the US Military Police, advertising copywriter, mystery novelist, photographer, archaeologist, and intrepid traveller."

== Early life ==
She was born Sylvia Anne Terry Smith on 28 May 1916, at 113 Ramsden Road, Balham, London, the elder daughter of William Horace Smith, an architect and chartered surveyor, and his wife, Annie Smith, née Terry, a Salvation Army officer. She was educated at Wimbledon Technical College until the age of 16.

== Career ==
Aged 16, she started work as a freelance journalist, in a women's magazine as its teenage agony aunt, and as an interviewer for newspaper arts pages.

At the start of the Second World War, she joined the BBC's monitoring service, where she met her future husband, Angus Matheson. Even though they divorced in 1950, she was to publish all her non-fiction books as Sylvia A. Matheson.

She wrote four Crime Club novels using her dog's name, Max and cat's name Mundy (Max Mundy), as her pseudonym, all adventure thrillers with a news photographer named Russell Jones as the chief protagonist: Death is a Tiger (1960) set in Baluchistan, Dig for a Corpse (1962) set in the mountains of central Asia, Pagan Pagoda (1965) in Burma, and Death Cries Olé (1966) in Spain. She was a fellow of the Royal Geographical Society.

The Daily Telegraph in her obituary, described her as, "an agony aunt, wartime intelligence operative, honorary colonel in the US Military Police, advertising copywriter, mystery novelist, photographer, archaeologist and intrepid traveller."

== Personal life ==
On 19 December 1941, she married Angus Matheson (1912–1962), son of Malcolm Matheson, a church minister in the Outer Hebrides, at Kingston and Surbiton Presbyterian Church. They divorced in 1950. Matheson would later become professor of Celtic languages and literatures at the University of Glasgow.

In 1956, she married Henry Beaumont Schofield (1916–1990), a petroleum engineer she met while reporting on the discovery of the Sui gas field in Pakistan's Bugti tribal area.
