= Book of the Dean of Lismore =

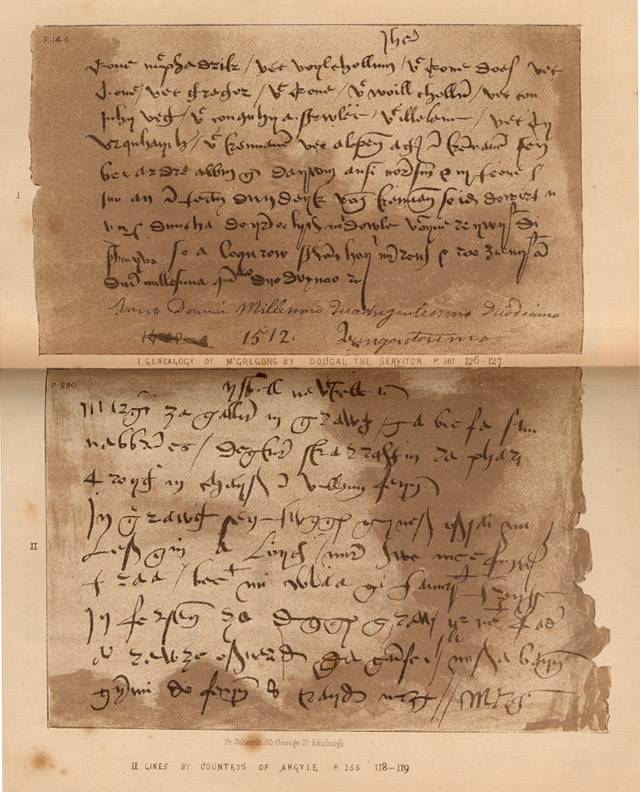
Two facsimiles, printed by William Forbes Skene in 1862; below are lines from the Countess of Argyll; above is a genealogy of the MacGregors.

The Book of the Dean of Lismore (Scottish Gaelic: Leabhar Deathan Lios Mòir) is a Scottish manuscript, compiled in eastern Perthshire in the first half of the 16th century. The chief compiler, after whom it is named, was James MacGregor (Seumas MacGriogair), vicar of Fortingall and titular Dean of Lismore Cathedral, although there are other probable scribes, including his brother Donnchadh and William Drummond (Uileam Druimeanach), curate of Fortingall. It is unrelated to the similarly named Book of Lismore, an Irish manuscript from the early 15th century.

The manuscript is primarily written in the "secretary hand" of Scotland, rather than the corra-litir style of hand-writing employed for written Gaelic in Ireland and Scotland. The orthography is the same kind used to write Lowland Scots, and was a common way of writing Scottish Gaelic in the Late Middle Ages.

Although the principal part of the manuscript's contents are in Gaelic, the manuscript as a whole is multilingual, and there are a significant number of texts written in Scots and Latin, including extracts from the Scots poets William Dunbar (d.1530) and Robert Henryson (d.1500), and there is a great deal of Gaelic-English diglossia throughout the manuscript. Many of the Gaelic texts are of Irish provenance, and in the case of bardic poetry, Irish poems outnumber Scottish poems 44 to 21.

The patrons of the manuscript appear to have been the Campbells of Glen Orchy, and the manuscript itself includes some of the poetry of Duncan Campbell (Donnchadh Caimbeul) of Glen Orchy. The manuscript currently lies in the National Library of Scotland, as Adv.MS.72.1.37. A digital version of the manuscript is available to view online.

It also is notable for containing poetry by at least four women. These include Aithbhreac Nighean Coirceadail (f. 1460), who wrote a lament for her husband, the constable of Castle Sween.

The same book also includes three poems by Iseabail Ní Mheic Cailéin, the daughter of Colin Campbell, 1st Earl of Argyll (died 1493). By far the most famous of the three poems is Éistibh, a Luchd an Tighe-se, which Thomas Owen Clancy has described as, "a fairly obscene boast to the court circle on the size and potency of her household priest's penis. The authenticity of the attribution to Iseabail has been questioned, but without substantial grounds."

== See also ==
- Fernaig manuscript
- Islay Charter
