= Donald MacKinnon (Celtic scholar) =

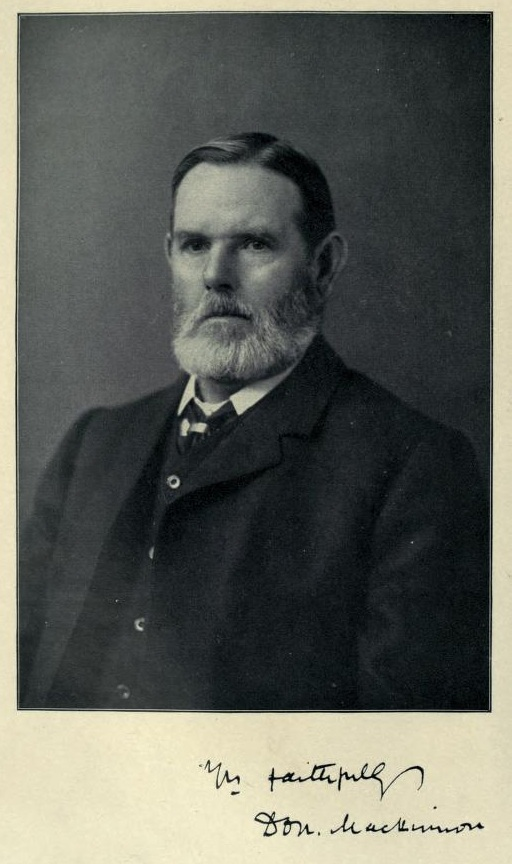
- Born: 18 April 1839; Kilchattan, Colonsay, Argyll, Scotland
- Died: 25 December 1914 (aged 75); Balnahard, Colonsay, Argyll, Scotland
- Occupation: Professor of celtic
- Known for: Celtic Studies
- Spouse: Catherine MacPhee MacKinnon (m. 1873) (1842–1917)
- Children: 5

Donald MacKinnon (1839–1914), born on Colonsay, an island in the Scottish Inner Hebrides, was a Celtic scholar, the first elected Professor of Celtic languages, literature, history and antiquities at Edinburgh University, a chair he occupied from 1882 to the year of his death in 1914. He is known particularly for his edition and translation of the so-called Glenmasan manuscript, and also catalogued the manuscripts in the Advocates Library collection.

== Education ==
He enrolled in the local Sean Sgoil (The Old School), and at the age of eighteen, attended the Church of Scotland Training College. He was Clerk to the Church of Scotland's Educational Scheme (1869). Continuing his study at Edinburgh University, he obtained the degree of M.A. in 1870. Later he became clerk and treasurer to the School Board of Edinburgh.

== Writings ==
MacKinnon began publishing essays in An Gaidheal (which ran from 1871 to 1877), and these essays were generally on the topic of proverbs or poetry. He also contributed to the Mac Talla, a Gaelic-language newspaper published 1892 to 1904 in Cape Breton, Nova Scotia.

Later he wrote his observations entitled "Place Names and Personal Names in Argyll", in The Scotsman, Nov–Jan 1888, in eighteen serialised parts.

He edited, translated, and annotated the fifteenth century Glenmasan manuscript (formerly Adv. Lib. MS. LIII, now National Library of Scotland Adv.MS.72.2.3), an important codex containing a later romance version of the Deirdre story besides other material.

=== List of Works ===
- "On the dialects of Scottish Gaelic" (1886).
- Reading book for the use of students of the Gaelic class at Edinburgh University (1889).
- Culture in Early Scotland (1892). (ed.)
- "The Glenmasan Manuscript" (1904–1907). (ed.)
- A Descriptive Catalogue of Gaelic Manuscripts in the Advocates' Library, Edinburgh, and elsewhere in Scotland (1912).
