= William J. Flynn (businessman) =

American businessman (1926–2018)

- Born: September 6, 1926; Manhattan, United States
- Died: June 2, 2018 (aged 91); New York
- Occupation: Businessman
- Known for: Activist for peace in Northern Ireland
- Spouse: Peggy
- Children: 4

William J. Flynn (1926–2018) was an American businessman and activist for peace in Northern Ireland.

== Early life ==
Flynn was born in Manhattan on 6 September 1926. After he married Peggy he settled in Garden City, New York where they had four children. After initially training for the priesthood he obtained a degree in economics from Fordham University.

== Career ==
He became president, CEO and chairman of the board of Manhattan-based Mutual of America Life Insurance which grew from a small retirement association to a Fortune 1000 mutual company. He oriented Mutual towards the non-profit sector. It now provides pension plans for the employees of more than 15,000 charities throughout America. He was responsible for the establishment of the Mutual of America Building at 320 Park Avenue.

He was also on the boards of many nonprofits including the American Cancer Society Foundation, and the Catholic Health Association of the United States.

== Northern Ireland activism ==
As a son of Irish immigrants he was interested in Irish affairs including The Troubles in Northern Ireland. He became actively involved in Northern Ireland peace process which led to the ceasefire. He was on the board of Co-operation Ireland and of the National Committee on American Foreign Policy.

== Honors ==
- 1994: Irish America (magazine) chose him as Irish American of the Year
- 1996: as Grand Marshal, he led the New York City St. Patrick's Day Parade.
- 1999: selected by Irish America as one of The Greatest Irish Americans of the 20th Century
- 2011: inducted into Irish America Hall of Fame

== Death and legacy ==
He died on 2 June 2018.

A William J. Flynn Center for Irish studies was established at the University of St. Thomas (Texas).
