= Fred Macaulay (radio producer) =

- Born: January 1, 1925; Sollas, North Uist Scotland
- Died: February 15, 2003
- Education: University of Edinburgh
- Occupations: Gaelic Scholar, Radio Producer
- Spouse: Sybil Thom
- Children: 3

Fred Ewen Gillies Macaulay (1 January 1925 — 15 February 2003) was a Gaelic scholar and radio producer who was head of the BBC Gaelic department for 19 years, and oversaw a tenfold increase of Gaelic broadcasting time.

== Biography ==
Macaulay was born in North Uist in 1925. He attended the Inverness Royal Academy. During World War Two, he served with the Royal Corps of Signals and the Queen's Own Cameron Highlanders. He then studied at the University of Edinburgh, earning a Master of Arts in Celtic Studies and a diploma in phonetics. He joined the BBC Gaelic department in 1954 and became head of the department in 1964. In the late 1970s he was the International director for the Pan Celtic Festival. In 1980, he became manager of BBC Highland, based in Inverness, before retiring on 1 July 1983. In his time at the BBC, Gaelic broadcasting on BBC Radio increased tenfold, from 1.5 hours to 15 hours per week. Macaulay was also responsible for Gaelic programs on TV, including current affairs, and the light entertainment series Se Ur Beatha ('You're welcome'). Macaulay also appointed the first woman in the BBC Gaelic department.

== Recognition ==
- 1999 - Radio Lifetime Achievement Award from the Celtic Film and Television Festival
- 2000 - Honorary Chieftain, Gaelic Society of Inverness
