= Professor of Gaelic (Glasgow) =

University of Glasgow professorship

Chair of Gaelic University of Glasgow
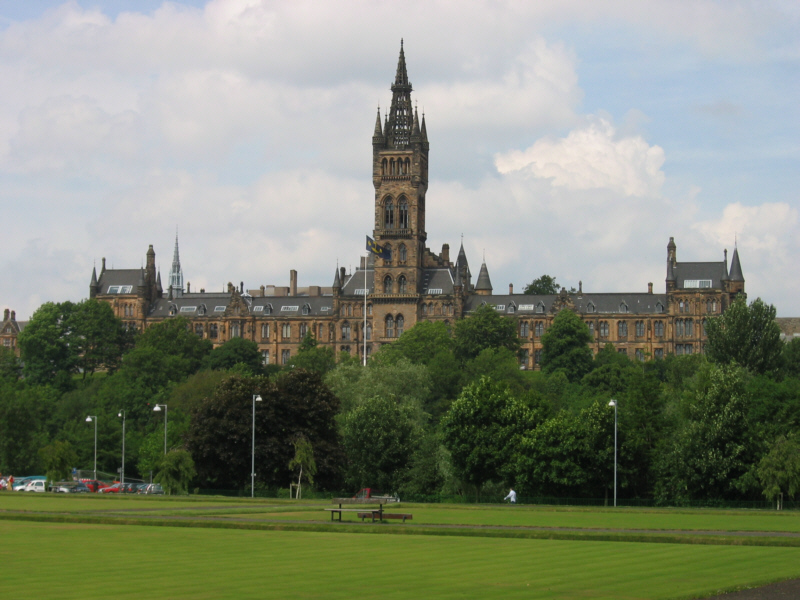
- Incumbent; Roibeard Ó Maolalaigh
- Formation: 2010
- First holder: Roibeard Ó Maolalaigh
- Website: www.gla.ac.uk/celtic

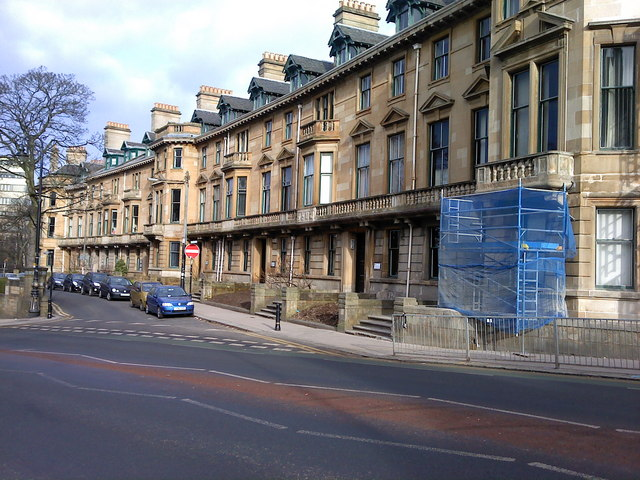
University Gardens, where the Celtic and Gaelic Department is housed

The Chair of Gaelic is a professorship in Scottish Gaelic at the University of Glasgow, in the Celtic and Gaelic department. It was established in April 2010 and is the first established Chair of Gaelic at a Scottish university.

== Establishment ==
A Chair of Celtic had already been established at the University of Glasgow in 1956, and the Chair of Gaelic was founded in April 2010 as part of the university's aim to establish itself as "a centre of excellence for the study of Celtic and Gaelic." The establishment of the chair was announced on the same day as Glasgow City Council launched its new Gaelic Language Plan with an aim of making Gaelic a commonly used language by 2020. The Scottish Government has been putting efforts into the support and revival of Gaelic in Scotland in recent years, in line with their duties under the European Charter for Regional or Minority Languages. The Gaelic Language (Scotland) Act 2005 established the Bòrd na Gàidhlig, a non-governmental public body responsible for the promomotion of Gaelic language in Scotland.

The first holder of the post is Professor Roibeard Ó Maolalaigh, who had previously held a personal professorship in Gaelic in the University of Glasgow. Professor Ó Maolalaigh was educated at University College Dublin and lectured at the University of Edinburgh whilst completing his PhD there. He was then appointed assistant professor of Celtic studies at the Dublin Institute for Advanced Studies, before moving to Glasgow. As head of the department at Glasgow, he appointed the first ever Gaelic language officer at a Scottish university. He is director of the Digital Archive of Scottish Gaelic, a project funded by the British Academy, and is also involved in Soillse, a project led by the University of the Highlands and Islands developing a research capacity for the maintenance and revitalisation of Gaelic in Scotland.

== Professors of Gaelic ==
- 2010–present: Roibeard Ó Maolalaigh

== See also ==
- Scottish studies
