= Goidelic languages =

Celtic subfamily of Ireland, Scotland and the Isle of Man

Goidelic
- Gaelic
- Geographic distribution: Ireland; Scotland; Isle of Man
- Linguistic classification: Indo-European: Celtic; Insular Celtic; Goidelic
- Early forms: Primitive Irish: Old Irish; Middle Irish
- Subdivisions: Irish • Shelta; Scottish Gaelic; Manx

Language codes
- Glottolog: goid1240

The Goidelic (/ɡɔɪˈdɛlɪk/, goy-DEL-ik) or Gaelic languages (/ˈɡeɪlɪk/, GALE-ik; Irish: teangacha Gaelacha; Scottish Gaelic: cànanan Goidhealach; Manx: çhengaghyn Gaelgagh) form one of the two groups of Insular Celtic languages, the other being the Brittonic languages.

Goidelic languages historically formed a dialect continuum stretching from Ireland through the Isle of Man to Scotland. There are three modern Goidelic languages: Irish (Gaeilge), Scottish Gaelic (Gàidhlig), and Manx (Gaelg). Manx died out as a first language in the 20th century but has since been revived to some degree.

== Nomenclature ==
"Gaelic", by itself, is sometimes used to refer to Scottish Gaelic, especially in Scotland, and therefore is ambiguous. Irish and Manx are sometimes referred to as Irish Gaelic and Manx Gaelic (as they are Goidelic or Gaelic languages), but the use of the word "Gaelic" is unnecessary because the terms Irish and Manx, when used to denote languages, always refer to those languages. This is in contrast to Scottish Gaelic, for which "Gaelic" distinguishes the language from the Germanic language known as Scots. In English, it is common to have distinct pronunciations of the word, with Scottish "Gaelic" pronounced /ˈɡælɪk/ compared to Irish and Manx "Gaelic" pronounced /ˈɡeɪlɪk/.

The endonyms (Gaeilge, Gaelic and Gaolainn in Irish, Gaelg in Manx and Gàidhlig in Scottish Gaelic) are derived from Old Irish Goídelc, which in turn is derived from Old Welsh Guoidel meaning 'wild men, savages'. The medieval mythology of the Lebor Gabála Érenn places its origin in an eponymous ancestor of the Gaels and the inventor of the language, Goídel Glas.

== Classification ==
The family tree of the Goidelic languages, within the Insular Celtic branch of the Celtic language family, is as follows

- Primitive Irish
  - Old Irish
    - Middle Irish
      - Early Modern Irish
        - Modern Irish
      - Scottish Gaelic
      - Manx

== Origin, history, and range ==
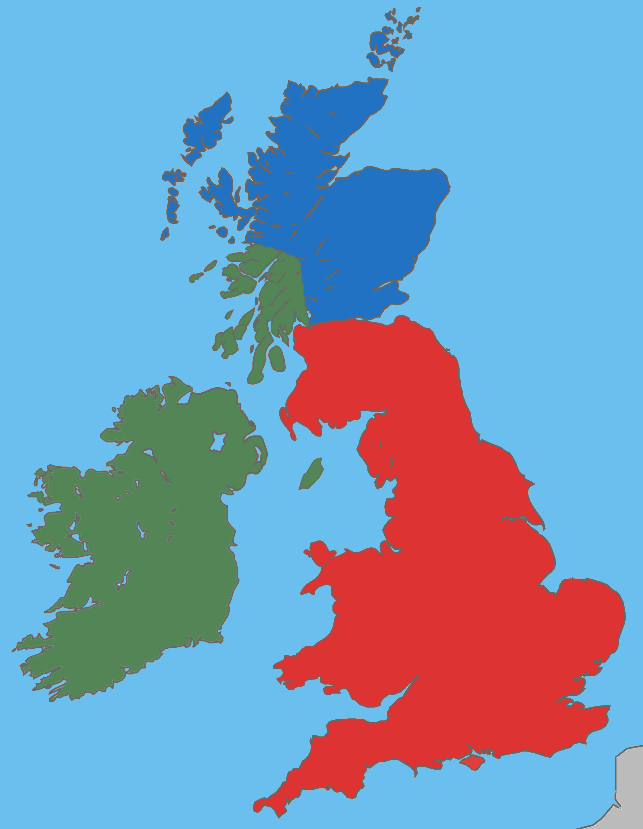
Britain and Ireland in the first few centuries of the 1st millennium, before the founding of Anglo-Saxon kingdoms. Mainly Goidelic areas Mainly Pictish areas Mainly Brittonic areas Goidelic language and culture would eventually become dominant in the Pictish area and far northern parts of the Brittonic area.

During the historical era, Goidelic was restricted to Ireland and, possibly, the west coast of Scotland. Medieval Gaelic literature tells us that the kingdom of Dál Riata emerged in western Scotland during the 6th century. The mainstream view is that Dál Riata was founded by Irish migrants, but this is not universally accepted. Archaeologist Ewan Campbell says there is no archaeological evidence for a migration or invasion, and suggests strong sea links helped maintain a pre-existing Gaelic culture on both sides of the North Channel.

Dál Riata grew in size and influence, and Gaelic language and culture was eventually adopted by the neighbouring Picts who lived throughout Scotland. Manx, the language of the Isle of Man, is closely akin to the Gaelic spoken in the Hebrides, the Irish spoken in northeast and eastern Ireland, and the now-extinct Galwegian Gaelic of Galloway (in southwest Scotland), with some influence from Old Norse through the Viking invasions and from the previous British inhabitants.

The oldest written Goidelic language is Primitive Irish, which is attested in Ogham inscriptions from about the 4th century. The forms of this speech are very close, and often identical, to the forms of Gaulish recorded before and during the time of the Roman Empire. The next stage, Old Irish, is found in glosses (i.e. annotations) to Latin manuscripts—mainly religious and grammatical—from the 6th to the 10th century, as well as in archaic texts copied or recorded in Middle Irish texts. Middle Irish, the immediate predecessor of the modern Goidelic languages, is the term for the language as recorded from the 10th to the 12th century; a great deal of literature survives in it, including the early Irish law texts.

Classical Gaelic, otherwise known as Early Modern Irish, covers the period from the 13th to the 18th century, during which time it was used as a literary standard in Ireland and Scotland. This is often called Classical Irish, while Ethnologue gives the name "Hiberno-Scottish Gaelic" to this standardised written language. As long as this written language was the norm, Ireland was considered the Gaelic homeland to the Scottish literati.

Later orthographic divergence has resulted in standardised pluricentristic orthographies. Manx orthography, which was introduced in the 16th and 17th centuries, was based loosely on English and Welsh orthography, and so never formed part of this literary standard.

=== Proto-Goidelic ===
Proto-Goidelic, or Proto-Gaelic, is the proposed proto-language for all branches of Goidelic. It is proposed as the predecessor of Goidelic, which then began to separate into different dialects before splitting during the Middle Irish period into the separate languages of Irish, Manx, and Scottish Gaelic.

== Irish ==
Irish is one of the Republic of Ireland's two official languages along with English. Historically the predominant language of the island, it is now mostly spoken in parts of the south, west, and northwest. The legally defined Irish-speaking areas are called the Gaeltacht; all government institutions of the Republic, in particular the parliament (Oireachtas), its upper house (Seanad) and lower house (Dáil), and the prime minister (Taoiseach) have official names in this language, and some are only officially referred to by their Irish names even in English. At present, the Gaeltachtaí are primarily found in Counties Cork, Donegal, Mayo, Galway, Kerry, and, to a lesser extent, in Waterford and Meath. In the Republic of Ireland 1,774,437 (41.4% of the population aged three years and over) regard themselves as able to speak Irish to some degree. Of these, 77,185 (1.8%) speak Irish on a daily basis outside school. Irish is also undergoing a revival in Northern Ireland and has been accorded some legal status there under the 1998 Good Friday Agreement, with it becoming an official language in 2022. The 2001 census in Northern Ireland showed that 167,487 (10.4%) people "had some knowledge of Irish". Combined, this means that around one in three people (c. 1.85 million) on the island of Ireland can understand Irish at some level.

Regions where respondents stated they could speak Irish from 2011

Despite the ascent in Ireland of the English and Anglicised ruling classes following the 1607 Flight of the Earls (and the disappearance of much of the Gaelic nobility), Irish was spoken by the majority of the population until the later 18th century, with a huge impact from the Great Famine of the 1840s. Disproportionately affecting the classes among whom Irish was the primary spoken language, famine and emigration precipitated a steep decline in native speakers, which only recently has begun to reverse.

The Irish language has been recognised as an official and working language of the European Union. Ireland's national language was the twenty-third to be given such recognition by the EU and previously had the status of a treaty language.

== Scottish Gaelic ==
A Scottish Gaelic speaker, recorded in Scotland

Linguistic division in early twelfth century Scotland: Gaelic speaking Norse–Gaelic zone, characterized by the use of both languages English-speaking zone Cumbric may have survived in this zone; more realistically a mixture of Cumbric, Gaelic (west), and English (east).

Some people in the north and west of mainland Scotland and many people in the Hebrides still speak Scottish Gaelic, but the language has been in decline. There are now believed to be approximately 60,000 native speakers of Scottish Gaelic in Scotland, plus around 1,000 speakers of the Canadian Gaelic dialect in Nova Scotia.

Its historical range was much larger. For example, it was the everyday language of most of the rest of the Scottish Highlands until little more than a century ago. Galloway was once also a Gaelic-speaking region, but the Galwegian dialect has been extinct there for approximately three centuries. It is believed to have been home to dialects that were transitional between Scottish Gaelic and the two other Goidelic languages. While Gaelic was spoken across the Scottish Borders and Lothian during the early High Middle Ages it does not seem to have been spoken by the majority and was likely the language of the ruling elite, land-owners and religious clerics. Some other parts of the Scottish Lowlands spoke Cumbric, and others Scots Inglis, the only exceptions being the Northern Isles of Orkney and Shetland where Norse was spoken. Scottish Gaelic was introduced across North America with Gaelic settlers. Their numbers necessitated North American Gaelic publications and print media from Cape Breton Island to California.

Scotland, known as Alba in Insular Celtic languages, takes its English language name from the Latin word for 'Gael', Scotus, plural Scoti (of uncertain etymology). Scotland originally meant Land of the Gaels in a cultural and social sense. (In early Old English texts, Scotland referred to Ireland.) Until late in the 15th century, Scottis in Scottish English (or Scots Inglis) was used to refer only to Gaelic, and the speakers of this language who were identified as Scots. As the ruling elite became Scots Inglis/English-speaking, Scottis was gradually associated with the land rather than the people, and the word Erse ('Irish') was gradually used more and more as an act of culturo-political disassociation, with an overt implication that the language was not really Scottish, and therefore foreign. This was something of a propaganda label, as Gaelic has been in Scotland for at least as long as English, if not longer.

In the early 16th century the dialects of northern Middle English, also known as Early Scots, which had developed in Lothian and had come to be spoken elsewhere in the Kingdom of Scotland, themselves later appropriated the name Scots. By the 17th century Gaelic speakers were restricted largely to the Highlands and the Hebrides. Furthermore, the culturally repressive measures taken against the rebellious Highland communities by The Crown following the second Jacobite Rebellion of 1746 caused still further decline in the language's use – to a large extent by enforced emigration (e.g. the Highland Clearances). Even more decline followed in the 19th and early 20th centuries.

The Scottish Parliament has afforded the language a secure statutory status and "equal respect" (but not full equality in legal status under Scots law) with English, sparking hopes that Scottish Gaelic can be saved from extinction and perhaps even revitalised.

== Manx ==
A Manx speaker, recorded on the Isle of Man.

Long the everyday language of most of the Isle of Man, Manx began to decline sharply in the 19th century. The last monolingual Manx speakers are believed to have died around the middle of the 19th century; in 1874 around 30% of the population were estimated to speak Manx, decreasing to 9.1% in 1901 and 1.1% in 1921. The last native speaker of Manx, Ned Maddrell, died in 1974.

At the end of the 19th century a revival of Manx began, headed by the Manx Language Society (Yn Çheshaght Ghailckagh). Both linguists and language enthusiasts searched out the last native speakers during the 20th century, recording their speech and learning from them. In the 2011 United Kingdom census, there were 1,823 Manx speakers on the island, representing 2.27% of the population of 80,398, following a steady increase in the number of speakers.

Today Manx is the sole medium for teaching at five of the island's pre-schools by a company named Mooinjer veggey ("little people"), which also operates the sole Manx-medium primary school, the Bunscoill Ghaelgagh. Manx is taught as a second language at all of the island's primary and secondary schools and also at the University College Isle of Man and Centre for Manx Studies.

== Comparison ==
=== Numbers ===
Comparison of Goidelic numbers, including Old Irish. Welsh numbers have been included for a comparison between Goidelic and Brythonic branches.

No.	Goidelic				Brythonic
No.	Old Irish	Irish	Scottish Gaelic	Manx	Welsh
1	óen	aon	aon	*un	un
2	dá	dó	dà	*daa	‡dau
3	trí	trí	trì	tree	‡tri
4	cethair	ceathair	ceithir	kiare	‡pedwar
5	cóic	cúig	còig	queig	pump
6	sé	sé	sia	shey	chwech
7	secht	seacht	seachd	shiaght	saith
8	ocht	ocht	ochd	hoght	wyth
9	noí	naoi	naoi	nuy	naw
10	deich	deich	deich	jeih	deg
11	óen déac	aon déag	aon deug	nane-jeig	unarddeg
12	dá dhéac/dhéuc	dó dhéag	dà dheug	daa-yeig	deuddeg
20	fichi	fiche	fichead	feed	ugain
100	cét	céad	ceud	keead	cant

* un and daa are no longer used in counting. Instead the suppletive forms nane and jees are normally used for counting. For comparative purposes, the historic forms are listed in the table above.

In the Welsh numbers, in cases where there are differences between masculine and feminine forms (marked ‡), the masculine forms are given.

=== Common phrases ===
Irish	Scottish Gaelic	Manx	English
Fáilte	Fàilte	Failt	Welcome
Ulster: Goidé mar atá tú? Connacht: Cén chaoi a bhfuil tú? Munster: Conas taoi?, Conas tánn tú?	Over-regional: Ciamar a tha thu? Lewis: Dè man a tha thu? Argyll and Outer Hebrides: Dè mar a tha thu?	Kys t'ou?	How are you?
Ulster: Cad é an t-ainm atá ort? Connacht: Cén t-ainm atá ort? Munster: Cad is ainm duit?	Over-regional: Dè an t-ainm a tha ort? West coast mainland: C' ainm a tha ort?	Cre'n ennym t'ort?	What is your name?
Is mise...	'S mise...	Mish...	I am...
Lá maith	Latha math	Laa mie	Good day
Maidin mhaith	Madainn mhath	Moghrey mie	Good morning
Tráthnóna maith	Feasgar math	Fastyr mie	Good afternoon/evening
Oíche mhaith	Oidhche mhath	Oie vie	Good night
Go raibh maith agat	Outer Hebrides and Skye: Tapadh leat Over-regional: Mòran taing Southwestern: Gun robh math agad	Gura mie ayd	‡Thank you
Slán leat	Mar sin leat	Slane lhiat	‡Good-bye
Sláinte	Slàinte	Slaynt	Health (used as a toast [cf. English "cheers"])

‡ Singular forms.

== Influence on other languages ==
There are several languages that show Goidelic influence, although they are not Goidelic languages themselves:

- Shelta language is sometimes thought to be a Goidelic language, but is in fact a cant based on Irish and English, with a primarily Irish-based grammar and English-based syntax.
- The Bungi dialect in Canada is an English dialect spoken by Métis that was influenced by Orkney English, Scots English, Cree, Ojibwe, and Scottish Gaelic.
- Beurla Reagaird is a cant spoken by Scottish travelling folk, which is to a large extent based on Scottish Gaelic.
- The Welsh language spoken in West Wales may still retain some influences of its Goidelic speaking past – the same applies to Cornish spoken in Western Cornwall and the English dialect of Merseyside Scouse.
- English and especially Highland English have numerous words of both Scottish Gaelic and Irish origin.

== See also ==
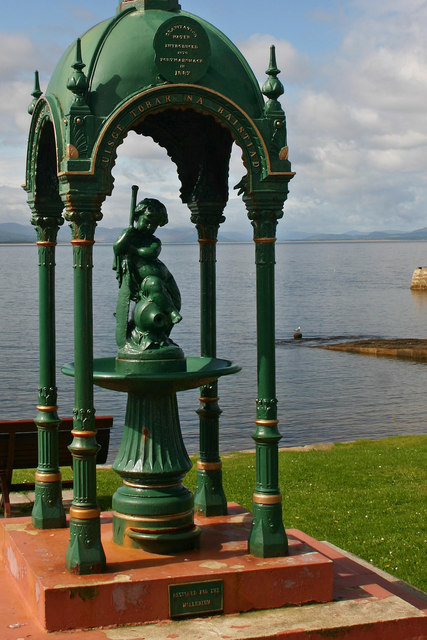
Water feature commemorating the first supply of water by gravitation to Portmahomack in 1887. It carries an inscription in poor Gaelic, "Uisce Tobar Na Baistiad" (which, if it read Uisge Tobar a' Bhaistidh would translate as "Water of the Well of Baptism")

- Comparison of Irish, Manx, and Scottish Gaelic
- Goidelic substrate hypothesis
- Proto-Celtic language
- Specific dialects of Irish:
  - Connacht Irish
  - Munster Irish
  - Newfoundland Irish
  - Ulster Irish
- Specific dialects of Scottish Gaelic:
  - Canadian Gaelic
  - Galwegian Gaelic
- Literature in the other languages of Britain
