= Irish Political Studies =

- Discipline: Political science
- Language: English

Publication details
- History: 1986–present
- Publisher: Routledge
- Frequency: Quarterly

Standard abbreviations
- ISO 4: Ir. Political Stud.

Indexing
- ISSN: 0790-7184 (print); 1743-9078 (web)

Links
- Journal homepage

Irish Political Studies is a quarterly peer-reviewed academic journal and the official journal of the Political Studies Association of Ireland covering research on Irish politics including politics of the Republic of Ireland and Northern Ireland and politics concerning relations with the United Kingdom and the European Union. The editors-in-chief are Thomas Hennessey (Canterbury) and R. Kenneth Carty (UBC). The journal was established in 1986 and is published by Routledge.

Irish Political Studies sponsors a conference paper prize at the annual conference of the Political Studies Association of Ireland each year. Previous winners include: Sean McGraw (Notre Dame), Jane Suiter (DCU), and Emmanuelle Schon-Quinlivan (UCC).

== Abstracting and indexing ==
The journal is abstracted and indexed in Current Contents/Social & Behavioral Sciences, Scopus and the Social Sciences Citation Index. According to the Journal Citation Reports, the journal has a 2015 impact factor of 0.633.
