= Islay Charter =

Grant of lands in 15th century Scotland

The Islay Charter or "Gaelic Charter of 1408" is a grant of lands by Domhnall of Islay, Lord of the Isles to "Brian Bhicaire Magaodh" (Brian Vicar MacKay), a resident of Islay, written in 1408. The charter is unique in being the only MacDonald land charter extant to have been written in the Gaelic language. It is also notable as a very early example of this kind of document written in a vernacular language rather than Latin and is one of the earliest examples of Gaelic in public use from the 15th century.

The Charter was composed and written on a piece of goatskin by Fearghas MacBeatha (Fergus Beaton) personal physician to the Lord of the Isles and a member of the famous Beaton medical kindred of the isles. The charter is also signed and holographed by the lord himself and was witnessed by a britheimh or 'judge', Pat McAbriuin. The lands granted consisted largely of the eastern portion of the island of approximately 400 acres (160 hectares).

An edition of the charter appears in Jean Munro and R. W. Munro (ed.), The Acts of the Lords of the Isles (Edinburgh, 1986), together with notes on the form of the manuscript and the locations of the lands granted.

== See also ==
- Fernaig manuscript
- Book of the Dean of Lismore
