= Canadian Association for Irish Studies =

- Abbreviation: CAIS
- Established: 1973; 53 years ago
- Founder: Robert O'Driscoll
- Location: Canada
- Fields: Irish culture
- Publication: The Canadian Journal of Irish Studies
- Website: canadianirishstudies.org

The Canadian Association for Irish Studies (CAIS; French: L'association canadienne d'études irlandaises) was founded by Robert O'Driscoll in 1973. Its objective is to promote the study of Irish culture in Canada, and its particular aim is to attract young scholars to the field. It uses conferences, publications and online resources to promote discussion of current ideas relating to Irish studies and culture.

CAIS has members throughout Canada. Others can be found in Ireland, the United Kingdom, the United States, elsewhere in Europe, Asia, and Australasia.

Among the Association's activities are an annual conference at a university in Canada. These conferences are attended by students, scholars, and members of the public.

The Association also publishes the semi-annual Canadian Journal of Irish Studies and a newsletter.
