= Studia Hibernica =

Academic journal of Irish Studies from Dublin City University

- Discipline: Irish Studies
- Language: English, Irish
- Edited by: Dr William Murphy, Professor Ciarán Mac Murchaidh

Publication details
- History: 1961-present
- Publisher: Dublin City University (formerly St Patrick's College, Drumcondra, Dublin) (Ireland)
- Frequency: Annually

Standard abbreviations
- ISO 4: Stud. Hibernica

Indexing
- ISSN: 0081-6477
- JSTOR: studhibe
- OCLC no.: 2242098

Links
- Journal homepage

Studia Hibernica is an annual academic journal for Irish studies, including a wide spectrum of Irish language and literature, history, etymology and toponymy, archaeology and folklore. It was originally published annually by St Patrick's College, Drumcondra, Dublin, and is now issued by Dublin City University, into which St Patrick's merged, in co-operation with Liverpool University Press.

The journal was established in 1961 by members of St Patrick's Training College, Drumcondra, including Gearóid Mac Eoin, Dónall Cregan, Séamus Ó Mórdha, Breandán Mac Aodha and Tadhg Ó Ceallaigh.

It is published by Dublin City University in cooperation with Liverpool University Press.
