= Comparison of Irish, Manx, and Scottish Gaelic =

Language comparison

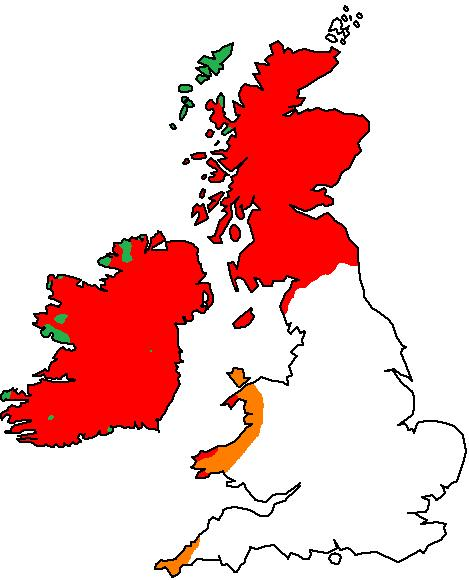
Map of the Gaelic-speaking world. The red area shows the maximum extent of Old Irish; the orange area shows places with Ogham inscriptions; and the green area are modern Gaelic-speaking areas.

Although Irish, Manx and Scottish Gaelic are closely related as Goidelic (a.k.a. Gaelic) Celtic languages, they are different in many ways. While most dialects are not immediately mutually comprehensible (although many individual words and phrases are), speakers of the three languages can rapidly develop mutual intelligibility.

== Phonetic and grammatical differences ==
The spoken dialects of Irish and Scottish Gaelic are most similar to one another in Ulster and southwestern Scotland, regions of close geographical proximity to one another. It is thought that the extinct dialect of Galwegian Gaelic, spoken in Galloway in the far south of Scotland, was very similar to Ulster Irish and Manx.

While the dialects of northern Scotland and southern Ireland tend to differ the most from one another in terms of vocabulary, they do share some features which are absent in other dialect areas lying between them. For example, in both Munster Irish and the Gaelic of the north of Scotland, historically short vowels have been diphthongised or lengthened before fortis sonorants. An example of this is the word clann "children of the family". In Munster Irish and northern Scottish Gaelic it is pronounced [kɫaunˠ] whereas in Ulster and County Mayo it is [kɫanˠ] and in Connemara [kɫɑːnˠ]; the Manx form cloan is [kɫaunˠ] in the north and [kɫoːdnˠ] in the south.

In addition, slender coronal stops (/tʲ/ and /tʲʰ/ in Scottish Gaelic; /tʲ/ and /dʲ/ in Irish), are affricated (such as [tʃ] and [dʒ]) in Mayo and Donegal, the southern Highlands and in Manx, but not in Munster or the northern Highlands.

In the verb tá of Standard Irish, northern Scotland and Central-Southern Munster agree in leniting the initial ⟨t⟩, thus one hears thá in County Waterford and County Tipperary, and tha in northern Scotland. West Munster also lenites the ⟨t⟩, but only after the preverb a 'that' e.g. an fear a thá ina sheasamh ag an doras 'the man that's standing at the door' (Standard Irish an fear atá ina sheasamh ag an doras, Scottish Gaelic am fear a tha na sheasamh aig an doras).

The closest to Scottish Gaelic in modern Irish is the dialect currently spoken in County Donegal, as illustrated by the sentence "How are you?".

Scottish Gaelic: Ciamar a tha sibh? (plural/formal) or Ciamar a tha thu? (singular/informal), Lewis dialect Dè mar a tha sibh? (plural/formal) Dè mar a tha thu? (singular/informal) (dè < cad è)
Ulster Irish: Cad é mar atá sibh? (plural) Cad é mar atá tú? (singular), often shortened to dé mar atá tú.
Connacht Irish: Cén chaoi a bhfuil sibh? (plural), Cén chaoi a bhfuil tú? (singular), in colloquial speech Cé chuil sib/tú
Munster Irish: Conas táthaoi (plural), Conas taoi? (singular), Conas tánn sibh/tú?, Conas atá sibh/tú?

Sibh is used in both Irish and Scottish Gaelic for the plural "you", while Scottish Gaelic (except for the far south) also uses sibh as a formal version of "you" (much like French uses vous; see "T–V distinction"). Modern Irish does not use this formal/informal distinction when addressing people. The use of sibh as 'polite' you is a retention from the Classical Irish usage of the plural personal pronouns to refer to the singular in polite communication. Thus sinn "we" for mé "I, me" and sibh "you (plural)" for tú "you/thou". Thu is used in Scottish Gaelic when speaking to an individual friend, family member, or a younger person.

The negative particle in Scottish Gaelic, Manx and Northern Ulster Irish is cha/chan (chan eil, cha bhfuil/chan fhuil = 'is not'; chan is from the Old Irish emphatic negative nichon). In standard Irish the negative particle is ní (níl = 'is not', a contraction of ní fhuil); ní is a retention of the normal Old Irish negative; these are illustrated by the sentence "I have no money":

Scottish Gaelic: Chan eil airgead agam.
Ulster Irish: Chan fhuil airgead agam
Manx: Cha nel argid aym.
Standard Irish: Níl airgead agam.

Scottish Gaelic speakers may also sound as if they were using the Irish phrase, as Chan eil can frequently be shortened to n eil.

The Classical Irish digraph ⟨éu⟩ [eːʷ] is still used in Scottish Gaelic spelling but is now obsolete in Irish, except in southern dialect writing, as a means to distinguish the vowel ⟨é⟩ when followed by a broad consonant from the regular dialect development ⟨é⟩ to ⟨i⟩ in the same environment, thus éan [ian] "bird" in comparison to d'éug [dʲeːɡ] "died; passed on). ⟨éa⟩ is now used instead of ⟨eu⟩ in Standard Irish. Both ⟨éa⟩ and ⟨éu⟩ existed in Classical Irish, to a large extent showing nominal case differences (with ⟨éu⟩ varying with ⟨éo⟩ in the dative of ⟨éa⟩-words), however in both Scotland and Ireland, spelling reforms and standardisation (which took place in Ireland under the auspices of the government of Ireland during the 20th century, and much earlier in Scotland) independently went for different versions.

At times Scottish writers used the spelling ⟨ia⟩ to represent how the combination is pronounced in northern dialects, writing ⟨ian⟩ instead of ⟨eun⟩, the southern form. Manx spelling, based mainly on English, shows that ⟨ia⟩ is also the underlying form in Manx, the word being spelled ⟨eean⟩.

=== Eclipsis ===
The most obvious phonological difference between Irish and Scottish Gaelic is that the phenomenon of eclipsis in Irish is diachronic (i.e. the result of a historical word-final nasal that may or may not be present in modern Irish) but fully synchronic in Scottish Gaelic (i.e. it requires the actual presence of a word-final nasal except for a tiny set of frozen forms). Eclipsis is shown in Irish orthography but not in Scottish Gaelic as it is conditioned by the actual environment.

For example, this means that phrases like Standard Irish ag an doras, standard Scottish Gaelic aig an doras^{†}, Manx ec y(n) dorrys is pronounced as follows in different parts of the Gaelic speaking world:

- Southern Irish: [ˌɪɟ ə(n̪ˠ) ˈn̪ˠɔɾˠəsˠ, ˌɟɛ (n̪ˠ) ˈn̪ˠɔɾˠəsˠ]
- Western and Northern Irish: [ˌɛɟ ə(n̪ˠ) ˈd̪ˠɔɾˠəsˠ]
- Scottish Gaelic (casual pronunciation, especially Lewis): [ˌɛkʲ ə ˈn̪ˠɔɾəs̪], more commonly [ˌɛkʲ ə(n̪ˠ)ˈd̪ɔɾəs̪] further south, with fully voiced ⟨d⟩.

An example of diachronic-type eclipsis are the numbers:

- Irish: bliana "year" > ocht mbliana "8 years"
- Scottish Gaelic: bliadhna > ochd bliadhna

^{†} In conservative speech, Scottish Gaelic feminine nouns also slenderise in the dative (prepositional) case, giving aig an uinneig, and so a different final consonant. This feature is uncommon today except in more formal registers and is ignored here.

== Orthographic differences ==
There are a number of distinctive orthographical (written) differences. The spellings of both languages have been reformed in recent decades, which has led to further divergence, though conversely more recent spelling reforms in Scottish Gaelic have reduced the divergences to some extent.

One difference is that the accent is written as a grave accent (Scottish Gaelic: stràc throm, "heavy stroke/accent") in Scottish Gaelic, as opposed to the acute accent ((síneadh) fada, "long (sign)" used in Irish; hence the word for "welcome" is written as fàilte in Scottish Gaelic and in Irish as fáilte. Irish does not use the grave accent, while until recently Scottish Gaelic used the grave and acute accents to differentiate between open and closed vowel sounds. However, recent spelling reform has meant that only grave accents are now in Scottish Gaelic, leaving phonemic distinctions unmarked.

Another difference in Scottish Gaelic is that the aspirate linker h- is always hyphenated, while in Irish it is attached to the beginning of the word, as illustrated by the languages' respective names for each other:

Scottish Gaelic – Gàidhlig (na h-Alba), Gàidhlig na h-Èireann
Standard Irish – Gaeilge na hAlban, Gaeilge (na hÉireann)

Additionally, while the linkers n- and t- are usually hyphenated in both languages, in Irish they are attached to the beginning of words whose first letter is capitalised; in Scottish Gaelic they are always hyphenated.

A number of letter combinations are possible in written Irish which are not found in Scottish Gaelic e.g. ⟨ae⟩, ⟨bhf⟩. Irish uses ⟨cht⟩ where Scottish Gaelic uses ⟨chd⟩, although ⟨chd⟩ itself was once common in written Irish, as was ⟨cht⟩ in Scottish Gaelic – both being used in Classical Gaelic. In the combinations ⟨sc/sg⟩ and ⟨st/sd⟩, Irish now uses ⟨sc⟩ and ⟨st⟩, while Scottish Gaelic uses ⟨sg⟩ and both ⟨sd⟩ and ⟨st⟩, despite there being no phonetic difference between the two languages.

Most obvious differences in spelling result from the deletion of silent lenited digraphs (mainly ⟨dh⟩, ⟨gh⟩, and ⟨th⟩) in Irish in spelling reforms, which was only sometimes done in Scottish Gaelic. Overall, Scottish Gaelic orthography is more conservative than that of Irish.

=== List of cognates ===
English	Irish	Scottish Gaelic	Manx	Notes
authority	údarás	ùghdarras	eaghtyrys	Pre 1950s ughdarás in Irish
black	dubh	dubh	doo	
bridge	droichead	drochaid	droghad	
child	páiste, leanbh	pàiste, leanabh	paitchey, lhiannoo	
church	eaglais	eaglais	agglish	In Irish, eaglais is a Roman Catholic house of worship; a Protestant house of worship is called a teampall (temple). Séipéal is also used as it can mean chapel as well.
day	lá	latha, là	laa	
Gael	Gael	Gàidheal	Gael	Pre 1950s Gaedheal in Irish
God	Dia	Dia	Jee	
government	rialtas	riaghaltas	reiltys	Pre-1950s riaghaltas in Irish
hotel	óstán, teach/tigh ósta	taigh-òsda	thie oast	Pre 1950s óstán/ósdán, teach/tigh ósta/ósda in Irish
house	teach; M: tigh	taigh	thie	In biblical Gaelic tigh
inside	isteach	a-steach	stiagh	
Ireland	Éire, Éirinn	Èirinn, Èire	Nerin	
island	oileán, inis	eilean, inis	ellan, inish	
king	rí	rìgh	ree	Pre-1950s genitive ríogh and dative rígh in Irish
news	nuacht; U: nuaidheacht	naidheachd	naight	
night	oíche	oidhche	oie	Pre 1950s oidhche in Irish
office	oifig	oifis	offish	
open	oscail	fosgail	foshil	Also foscail in Ulster Irish
parliament	parlaimint	pàrlamaid	parlamaid	
prayer	urnaí	ùrnaigh	!	Also urnaighe in Irish.
radio	raidió	radio	radio	Also réidió and rèidio in spoken Irish and Scottish Gaelic
report	aithris	aithris	arrish	
river	abhainn, M: abha	abhainn	awin	
school	scoil	sgoil	scoill	Pre 1950s sgoil/scoil in Irish
Scotland	Alba, Albain	Alba	Albey	
star	réalt(a)	reul	rolt	Pre 1950s réalt(a), reult(a) in Irish
town	baile	baile	balley	
without	gan	gun	dyn, gyn	
water	uisce	uisge	ushtey	
whisk(e)y	uisce beatha	uisge-beatha	ushtey bea	
white	bán	bàn	bane	
year	bliain	bliadhna	blein	Pre-1950s bliadhain in Irish. The form bliadhna (bliana today) is used as a special plural form following numerals; the regular plural is blianta). Some eastern Scottish Gaelic dialects use the form bliadhn.

== Differences in vocabulary ==
English	Irish	Scottish Gaelic	Notes
America	Meiriceá, Meirice	Ameireaga	
Bible	Bíobla	Bìoball	
cold (sickness)	slaghdán	cnatan	Meaning illness
England	Sasana	Sasainn	
Germany	An Ghearmáin	A' Ghearmailt	
in	i, in	(ann) an	In Classical Irish the forms were "i", "a", "in", "an" – "i/in" when the following sound was slender, and "a/an" when the following sound was broad. In both Irish and Scottish, in the spoken language, the four forms of "i", "a", "in", "an" still exist.
London	Londain	Lunnain	
minister	ministir, ministéir	ministear	In Irish, aire for a government minister
road	bóthar/ród	rathad	
talking	ag caint	a' bruidhinn	Bruíon (formerly bruighean) in Irish means "fighting", "quarrelling." Cainnt in Scottish Gaelic is used as a noun only, meaning "speech," except in Arran where it is also a verb

Differences can also be seen in words used for geographical features. For example, "hill" and "mountain" are usually "cnoc" (Cnoc na Péiste) and "sliabh" (Slieve Donard) respectively in Ireland, but "càrn" (Cairn Gorm) and "beinn" (Ben Nevis) in Scotland. Additionally, "inbhir," meaning "river mouth" and usually Anglicized as "inver" (for example Inverness or Inveraray), very common in Scotland, is almost never seen in Ireland.

=== False friends ===
Irish	English	Scottish Gaelic	English	Notes
An Bhreatain Bheag	Wales	A' Bhreatainn Bheag	Brittany	Breatain (Britain) is the same in both. The Scottish Gaelic equivalent for Wales is A' Chuimrigh, a Gaelicisation of an Anglicisation of the Welsh Cymru. The Irish for Brittany is An Bhriotáin from Latin "Britannia".
cuan	harbour	cuan	ocean	A number of words are used in both languages for "ocean" and "sea", such as aigéan/aigeun, an fharraige. Caladh or cala (also in the compound "calafort" < "cala-phort") are commonly used in Irish for "harbour".
shiúil sé	He walked	shiubhail e	He died	Siubhail means "walk" or "stroll" in Scottish Gaelic, but is also a euphemism for death

== Comparison of text ==
Article 1 of the UDHR in the languages:

Language	Text
English	All human beings are born free and equal in dignity and rights. They are endowed with reason and conscience and should act towards one another in a spirit of brotherhood.
Irish	Saolaítear gach duine den chine daonna saor agus comhionann i ndínit agus i gcearta. Tá bua an réasúin agus an choinsiasa acu agus ba cheart dóibh gníomhú i dtreo a chéile i spiorad an bhráithreachais.
Manx	Ta dy chooilley ghooinney ruggit seyr as corrym rish dy chooilley ghooinney elley ayns ooashley as ayns cairys. Ta resoon as cooinsheanse stowit orroo as lhisagh ad dellal rish y cheilley lesh spyrryd braaragh.
Scottish Gaelic	Rugadh a h-uile duine saor agus co-ionnan nan urram 's nan còirichean. Tha iad reusanta is cogaiseach, agus bu chòir dhaibh giùlain ris a chèile ann an spiorad bràthaireil.

== See also ==
- An Caighdeán Oifigiúil (standard of orthography and grammar used by the Government of Ireland)
- Dialect continuum
- Early Modern Irish
- Middle Irish
- Old Irish
