= Thomas Owen Clancy =

American academic and historian

Thomas Owen Clancy is an American academic and historian who specializes in medieval Celtic literature, especially that of Scotland. He did his undergraduate work at New York University, and his PhD at the University of Edinburgh. He is currently at the University of Glasgow, where he was appointed Professor of Celtic in 2005.

In 2001 and following Professor Dumville's paper in Gildas: new approaches, Clancy argued that St. Ninian was a Northumbrian spin-off of the name Uinniau (Irish St Finnian), the Irish missionary to whom St. Columba was a disciple, who in Great Britain was associated with Whithorn. He argued that the confusion is due to an eighth century scribal spelling error, for which the similarities of "u" and "n" in the Insular script of the period were responsible. Clancy has also done work on the Lebor Bretnach, arguing that it was written in Scotland.

His works include:

- (with Gilbert Márkus), Iona: the earliest poetry of a Celtic monastery, (Edinburgh University Press: Edinburgh, 1995)
- (ed.), The Triumph Tree: Scotland’s Earliest Poetry, 550–1350, (Canongate: Edinburgh, 1998) with translations by G. Márkus, J.P. Clancy, T.O. Clancy, P. Bibire and J. Jesch
- "The Scottish provenance of the ‘Nennian’ recension of Historia Brittonum and the Lebor Bretnach " in: S. Taylor (ed.), Picts, Kings, Saints and Chronicles: A Festschrift for Marjorie O. Anderson (Four Courts: Dublin, 2000) 87–107
- "A Gaelic Polemic Quatrain from the Reign of Alexander I, ca. 1113" in: Scottish Gaelic Studies vol.20 (2000) 88–96
- Clancy, Thomas O (2001). "The real St Ninian". Innes Review. 52: 1–28. doi:10.3366/inr.2001.52.1.1. ISSN 0020-157X.
- "Philosopher-King : Nechtan mac Der-Ilei" in: the Scottish Historical Review, 83 (2004), 125–249.
