= Professor of Celtic (Glasgow) =

Endowed professorship

Chair of Celtic University of Glasgow
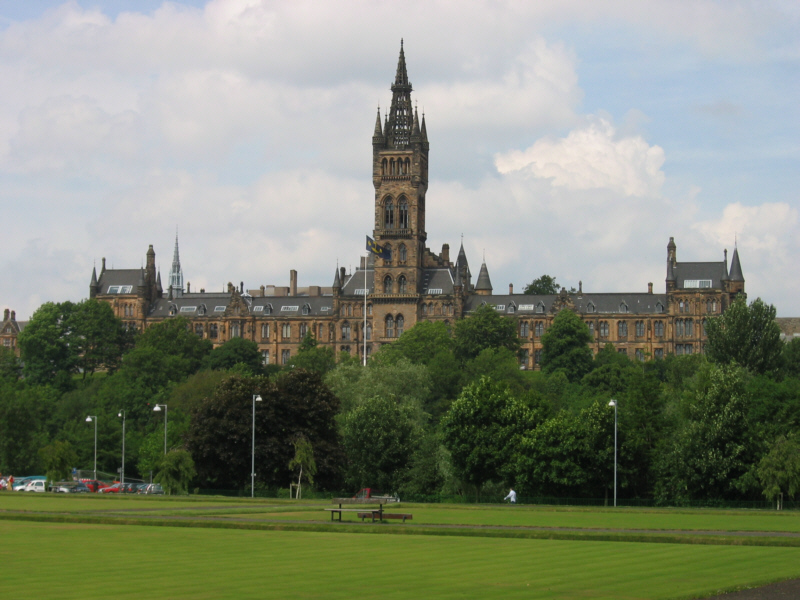
- Incumbent; Thomas Clancy
- Formation: 1956
- First holder: Angus Matheson
- Website: www.gla.ac.uk/celtic

The Chair of Celtic is a professorship at the University of Glasgow, established in 1956 by an endowment from merchant James Crawford, the Ross Trust and the university's Ossianic Society.

== History ==
In 1942, dyestuff and chemical merchant James Crawford died, leaving a portion of his estate to the university to found a chair in Celtic language and literature. The chair was established in 1956 using these funds as well as contributions from the university's Ossianic Society and the Ross Trust. The first professor, Angus Matheson, was appointed that year. Matheson, formerly senior lecturer in Celtic at the University, remained in post until his death in 1962.

In 1963, Derick Thomson was appointed to the chair. Thomson, also known under his Gaelic name, Ruaraidh MacThòmais, had been lecturer in Welsh at the university from 1949 until 1956, when he became head of the Department of Celtic at the University of Aberdeen. He was editor of Scottish Gaelic Studies, a journal produced by the Aberdonian department, founded Gairm, a quarterly Gaelic magazine which ran for over 50 years under his editorship, and wrote extensive poetry. He was awarded an honorary degree of Doctor of Letters by the university in 2007. When Thomson retired in 1991, he was succeeded by a fellow Aberdeen academic, Donald MacAulay, who had succeeded Thomson as editor of Scottish Gaelic Studies in 1978. MacAulay took over the chair in 1991, remaining at the university until 1995.

MacAuley was succeeded by Irish academic Cathair Ó Dochartaigh, who studied at Queen's University Belfast, received a PhD from the University of Aberdeen, and lectured at the Department of Celtic at the University of Aberdeen between 1972 and 1983. He worked outside academia from 1984 to 1995 in Dublin and North Wales, before taking over the chair in Glasgow in 1995. Ó Dochartaigh was succeeded in 2005 by American academic Thomas Owen Clancy. Clancy studied at New York University, and received a PhD from the University of Edinburgh, and now specialises in Dark Age Celtic literature. In 2001, he put forward a theory that St Ninian, an eighth century missionary among the Pictish peoples of what is now Scotland, was in fact a Northumbrian spin-off of St Finnian, the British missionary to whom St Columba was a disciple. He argued that the confusion is due to an eighth century scribal spelling error, for which the similarities of "u" and "n" in the Insular script of the period were responsible.

The Chair of Celtic is based within the Department of Celtic and Gaelic, part of the School of Humanities in the College of Arts.

== Professors of Celtic ==
- 1956 – Angus Matheson
- 1963 – Derick Thomson
- 1991 – Donald MacAulay
- 1995 – Cathair Ó Dochartaigh
- 2005 – Thomas Clancy

== See also ==
- Chair of Gaelic, Glasgow
- Jesus Professor of Celtic, Oxford
- Scottish studies
