= Osborn Bergin =

Irish linguist (1873–1950)

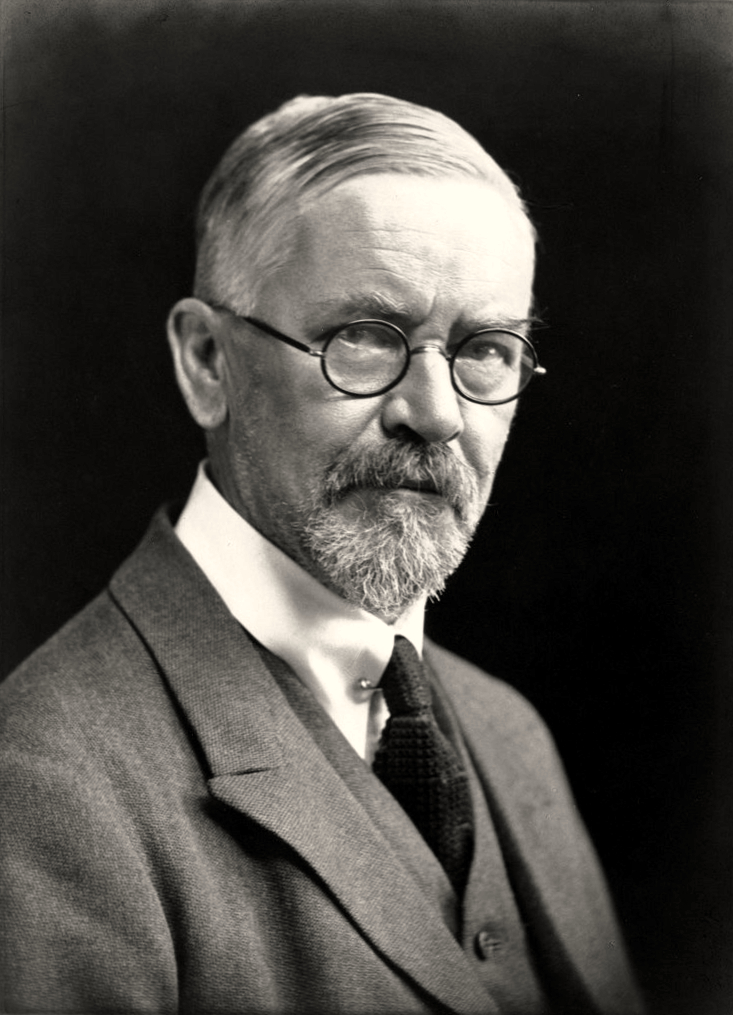
- Bergin, c. 1930s
- Born: 26 November 1873; Cork, Ireland
- Died: 6 October 1950 (aged 76); Dublin, Ireland

Osborn Joseph Bergin (Irish: Osborn Ó hAimhirgín; 26 November 1873 – 6 October 1950) was an Irish scholar of the Irish language and early Irish literature, who discovered what is now known as Bergin's law.

== Biography ==
Bergin was born in Cork, sixth child and eldest son of Osborn Roberts Bergin and Sarah Reddin, and was educated at Queen's College Cork (now University College Cork). He then went to Germany for advanced studies in Celtic languages, working with Heinrich Zimmer at the Friedrich Wilhelm University of Berlin (now the Humboldt University of Berlin) and later with Rudolf Thurneysen at the University of Freiburg, where he wrote his dissertation on palatalization in 1906. He then returned to Ireland and taught at the School of Irish Learning and at University College Dublin.

Within one year of becoming Director of the School of Irish Studies in the Dublin Institute for Advanced Studies, Bergin resigned both the senior professorship and his office of director. The reason for his resignation was never made public.

Bergin did not seem to have felt the need of institutional religion and, during his lifetime, he rarely attended religious services. He developed Irish nationalist sympathies and remained a firm nationalist all his life but without party affiliations. From the number of Irish speakers living in Cork, Bergin quickly mastered the spoken Irish of West Munster. By 1897, his knowledge of spoken and literary Modern Irish was so strong that he was appointed lecturer in Celtic at Queen's College, Cork. It was during this time that he became an active member of the Gaelic League.

He published extensively in the journal for Irish scholarship, Ériu. He is best known for his discovery of Bergin's law, which states that while the normal order of a sentence in Old Irish is verb–subject–object, it is permissible for the verb, in the conjunct form, to be placed at the end of the sentence. His friend Frank O'Connor wrote humorously that, while he discovered the law, "he never really believed in it". He wrote poetry in Irish and made a number of well-received translations of Old Irish love poetry.

He is celebrated in Brian O'Nolan's poem Binchy and Bergin and Best, originally printed in the Cruiskeen Lawn column in the Irish Times and now included in The Best of Myles. He was noted for his feuds with George Moore and William Butler Yeats, but he enjoyed a lifelong friendship with George William Russell. Frank O'Connor, another good friend, describes Bergin's eccentricities affectionately in his memoir My Father's Son.

Bergin died in a nursing home in Dublin at the age of 76, having never married.
