= Bergin's law =

Grammatical law of Old Irish

Bergin's law is a grammatical law of Old Irish. It is named for the Irish linguist Osborn Bergin (1873–1950), who identified it.

Bergin's law states that while in Old Irish the normal order of a sentence is verb–subject–object, it is permissible for the verb, in the conjunct form, to appear at the end of the sentence.

== See also ==
- Glossary of sound laws in the Indo-European languages
