= Old Irish =

Oldest widely attested Gaelic language

- Old Gaelic
- Goídelc
- Pronunciation: [ˈɡoːi̯ðʲelɡ]
- Region: Ireland, Isle of Man, Wales, Scotland, Devon, Cornwall
- Era: 6th–10th century; evolved into Middle Irish by around the 10th century
- Language family: Indo-European: Celtic; Insular Celtic; Goidelic; Old Irish
- Early form: Primitive Irish
- Writing system: Latin, Ogham

Language codes
- ISO 639-2: sga
- ISO 639-3: sga
- Glottolog: oldi1246
- Linguasphere: 50-AAA-ad

Old Irish, also called Old Gaelic (endonym: Goídelc; Irish: Sean-Ghaeilge; Scottish Gaelic: Seann-Ghàidhlig; Manx: Shenn Yernish or Shenn Ghaelg), is the oldest form of the Goidelic/Gaelic language for which there are extensive written texts. It was used from c. 600 to c. 900. The main contemporary texts are dated c. 700–850; by 900 the language had already transitioned into Early Middle Irish. Some Old Irish texts date from the 10th century, although these are presumably copies of texts written at an earlier time. Old Irish is the direct ancestor to Early Modern Irish, Manx Gaelic and Scots Gaelic.

Old Irish is known for having a particularly complex system of morphology and especially of allomorphy (more or less unpredictable variations in stems and suffixes in differing circumstances), as well as a complex sound system involving grammatically significant consonant mutations to the initial consonant of a word. Apparently, (Note: It is difficult to know for sure, given how little Primitive Irish is attested and the limitations of the Ogham alphabet used to write it.) neither characteristic was present in the preceding Primitive Irish period, though initial mutations likely existed in a non-grammaticalised form in the prehistoric era.

Contemporary Old Irish scholarship is still greatly influenced by the works of a small number of scholars active in the late 19th and early 20th centuries, such as Rudolf Thurneysen (1857–1940) and Osborn Bergin (1873–1950).

== Notable characteristics ==
Notable characteristics of Old Irish compared with other old Indo-European languages, are:

- Initial mutations, including lenition, nasalisation and aspiration/gemination.
- A complex system of verbal allomorphy.
- A system of conjugated prepositions that is unusual in Indo-European languages but common to Celtic languages. There is a great deal of allomorphy here, as well.
- Infixed or prefixed object prepositions, which are inserted between the verb stem and its initial prefix(es). If a verb lacks any such prefixes, a dummy prefix is normally added.
- Special verbal conjugations are used to signal the beginning of a relative clause.

Old Irish also preserves most aspects of the complicated Proto-Indo-European (PIE) system of morphology. Nouns and adjectives are declined in three genders (masculine, feminine, neuter); three numbers (singular, dual, plural); and five cases (nominative, vocative, accusative, dative and genitive). Most PIE noun stem classes are maintained (o-, yo-, ā-, yā-, i-, u-, r-, n-, s-, and consonant stems). Most of the complexities of PIE verbal conjugation are also maintained, and there are new complexities introduced by various sound changes (see below).

== Classification ==
Old Irish was the only known member of the Goidelic branch of the Celtic languages, which is, in turn, a subfamily of the wider Indo-European language family that also includes the Slavonic, Italic/Romance, Indo-Aryan and Germanic subfamilies, along with several others. Old Irish is the ancestor of all modern Goidelic languages: Modern Irish, Scottish Gaelic and Manx.

A still older form of Irish is known as Primitive Irish. Fragments of Primitive Irish, mainly personal names, are known from inscriptions on stone written in the Ogham alphabet. The inscriptions date from about the 4th to the 6th centuries. Primitive Irish appears to have been very close to Common Celtic, the ancestor of all Celtic languages, and it had a lot of the characteristics of other archaic Indo-European languages.

== Sources ==
Relatively little survives in the way of strictly contemporary sources. They are represented mainly by shorter or longer glosses on the margins or between the lines of religious Latin manuscripts, most of them preserved in monasteries in Germany, Italy, Switzerland, France and Austria, having been taken there by early Irish missionaries. Whereas in Ireland, many of the older manuscripts appear to have been worn out through extended and heavy use, their counterparts on the Continent were much less prone to the same risk because once they ceased to be understood, they were rarely consulted.

The earliest Old Irish passages may be the transcripts found in the Cambrai Homily, which is thought to belong to the early 8th century. The Book of Armagh contains texts from the early 9th century. Important Continental collections of glosses from the 8th and 9th century include the Würzburg Glosses (mainly) on the Pauline Epistles, the Milan Glosses on a commentary to the Psalms and the St Gall Glosses on Priscian's Grammar.

Further examples are found at Karlsruhe (Germany), Paris (France), Milan, Florence and Turin (Italy). A late 9th-century manuscript from the abbey of Reichenau, now in St. Paul in Carinthia (Austria), contains a spell and four Old Irish poems. The Liber Hymnorum and the Stowe Missal date from about 900 to 1050.

In addition to contemporary witnesses, the vast majority of Old Irish texts are attested in manuscripts of a variety of later dates. Manuscripts of the later Middle Irish period, such as the Lebor na hUidre and the Book of Leinster, contain texts which are thought to derive from written exemplars in Old Irish now lost and retain enough of their original form to merit classification as Old Irish.

The preservation of certain linguistic forms current in the Old Irish period may provide reason to assume that an Old Irish original directly or indirectly underlies the transmitted text or texts.

== Phonology ==
=== Consonants ===
The consonant inventory of Old Irish is shown in the chart below. The complexity of Old Irish phonology is from a four-way split of phonemes inherited from Primitive Irish, with both a fortis–lenis and a "broad–slender" (velarised vs. palatalised) distinction arising from historical changes. The sounds /f v θ ð x ɣ h ṽ n l r/ are the broad lenis equivalents of broad fortis /p b t d k ɡ s m N L R/; likewise for the slender (palatalised) equivalents. (However, most /f fʲ/ sounds actually derive historically from /w/, since /p/ was relatively rare in Old Irish, being a recent import from other languages such as Latin.)

		Labial	Dental	Alveolar	Velar	Glottal
Nasal	broad	m	N n		ŋ	
Nasal	slender	mʲ	Nʲ nʲ		ŋʲ	
Plosive	broad	p b	t d		k ɡ	
Plosive	slender	pʲ bʲ	tʲ dʲ		kʲ ɡʲ	
Fricative	broad	f v	θ ð	s	x ɣ	h
Fricative	slender	fʲ vʲ	θʲ ðʲ	sʲ	xʲ ɣʲ	hʲ
Nasalized fricative	broad	ṽ				
Nasalized fricative	slender	ṽʲ				
Approximant	broad		R r			
Approximant	slender		Rʲ rʲ			
Lateral	broad		L l			
Lateral	slender		Lʲ lʲ			

Some details of Old Irish phonetics are not known. /sʲ/ may have been pronounced [ɕ] or [ʃ], as in Modern Irish. /hʲ/ may have been the same sound as /h/ or /xʲ/. The precise articulation of the fortis sonorants /N/, /Nʲ/, /L/, /Lʲ/, /R/, /Rʲ/ is unknown, but they were probably longer, tenser and generally more strongly articulated than their lenis counterparts /n/, /nʲ/, /l/, /lʲ/, /r/, /rʲ/, as in the Modern Irish and Scottish dialects that still possess a four-way distinction in the coronal nasals and laterals. /Nʲ/ and /Lʲ/ may have been pronounced [ɲ] and [ʎ] respectively. The difference between /R(ʲ)/ and /r(ʲ)/ may have been that the former were trills while the latter were flaps. /m(ʲ)/ and /ṽ(ʲ)/ were derived from an original fortis–lenis pair.

=== Vowels ===
Old Irish had distinctive vowel length in both monophthongs and diphthongs. Short diphthongs were monomoraic, taking up the same amount of time as short vowels, while long diphthongs were bimoraic, the same as long vowels. (This is much like the situation in Old English but different from Ancient Greek whose shorter and longer diphthongs were bimoraic and trimoraic, respectively: /ai/ vs. /aːi/.) The inventory of Old Irish long vowels changed significantly over the Old Irish period, but the short vowels changed much less.

The following short vowels existed:

	Monophthongs		Diphthongs	
Close	i	u	ĭu	
Mid	e	o	ĕu	(ŏu)^{1}
Open	a, (æ ~ œ?)		ău	

^{1}The short diphthong ŏu likely existed very early in the Old Irish period, but merged with /u/ later on and in many instances was replaced with /o/ due to paradigmatic levelling. It is attested once in the phrase i routh by the prima manus of the Würzburg Glosses.

/æ ~ œ/ arose from the u-infection of stressed /a/ by a /u/ that preceded a palatalized consonant. This vowel faced much inconsistency in spelling, often detectable by a word containing it being variably spelled with ⟨au, ai, e, i, u⟩ across attestations. Tulach "hill, mound" is the most commonly cited example of this vowel, with the spelling of its inflections including tulach itself, telaig, telocho, tilchaib, taulich and tailaig. This special vowel also ran rampant in many words starting with the stressed prefix air- (from Proto-Celtic *ɸare).

Archaic Old Irish (before about 750) had the following inventory of long vowels:

	Monophthongs		Diphthongs	
Close	iː	uː	iu	ui
Mid	e₁ː, e₂ː^{1}	o₁ː, (o₂ː?)^{2}	eu	oi, (ou)^{3}
Open	aː		ai, au^{3}	

^{1}Both /e₁ː/ and /e₂ː/ were normally written ⟨é⟩ but must have been pronounced differently because they have different origins and distinct outcomes in later Old Irish. /e₁ː/ stems from Proto-Celtic *ē (< PIE *ei), or from ē in words borrowed from Latin. /e₂ː/ generally stems from compensatory lengthening of short *e because of loss of the following consonant (in certain clusters) or a directly following vowel in hiatus. It is generally thought that /e₁ː/ was higher than /e₂ː/. Perhaps /e₁ː/ was [eː] while /e₂ː/ was [ɛː]. They are clearly distinguished in later Old Irish, in which /e₁ː/ becomes ⟨ía⟩ (but ⟨é⟩ before a palatal consonant). /e₂ː/ becomes ⟨é⟩ in all circumstances. Furthermore, /e₂ː/ is subject to u-affection, becoming ⟨éu⟩ or ⟨íu⟩, while /e₁ː/ is not.

^{2}A similar distinction may have existed between /o₁ː/ and /o₂ː/, both written ⟨ó⟩, and stemming respectively from former diphthongs (*eu, *au, *ou) and from compensatory lengthening. However, in later Old Irish both sounds appear usually as ⟨úa⟩, sometimes as ⟨ó⟩, and it is unclear whether /o₂ː/ existed as a separate sound any time in the Old Irish period.

^{3}/ou/ existed only in early archaic Old Irish (c.700 or earlier); afterwards it merged into /au/. Neither sound occurred before another consonant, and both sounds became ⟨ó⟩ in later Old Irish (often ⟨ú⟩ or ⟨u⟩ before another vowel). The late ⟨ó⟩ does not develop into ⟨úa⟩, suggesting that ⟨áu⟩ > ⟨ó⟩ postdated ⟨ó⟩ > ⟨úa⟩.

Later Old Irish had the following inventory of long vowels:

	Monophthongs		Diphthongs	
Close	iː	uː	iu, ia	ui, ua
Mid	eː	oː	eu	oi?^{1}
Open	aː			

^{1}Early Old Irish /ai/ and /oi/ merged in later Old Irish. It is unclear what the resulting sound was, as scribes continued to use both ⟨aí⟩ and ⟨oí⟩ to indicate the merged sound. The choice of /oi/ in the table above is somewhat arbitrary.

The distribution of short vowels in unstressed syllables is a little complicated. All short vowels may appear in absolutely final position (at the very end of a word) after both broad and slender consonants. The front vowels /e/ and /i/ are often spelled ⟨ae⟩ and ⟨ai⟩ after broad consonants, which might indicate a retracted pronunciation here, perhaps something like [ɘ] and [ɨ]. All ten possibilities are shown in the following examples:

Old Irish	Pronunciation	English	Annotations
marba	/ˈmarva/	kill	1 sg. subj.
léicea	/ˈLʲeːɡʲa/	leave	1 sg. subj.
marbae	/ˈmarve/ ([ˈmarvɘ]?)	kill	2 sg. subj.
léice	/ˈLʲeːɡʲe/	leave	2 sg. subj.
marbai	/ˈmarvi/ ([ˈmarvɨ]?)	kill	2 sg. indic.
léici	/ˈlʲeːɡʲi/	leave	2 sg. indic.
súlo	/ˈsuːlo/	eye	gen.
doirseo	/ˈdoRʲsʲo/	door	gen.
marbu	/ˈmarvu/	kill	1 sg. indic.
léiciu	/ˈLʲeːɡʲu/	leave	1 sg. indic.

The distribution of short vowels in unstressed syllables, other than when absolutely final, was quite restricted. It is usually thought that there were only two allowed phonemes: /ə/ (written ⟨a, ai, e, i⟩ depending on the quality of surrounding consonants) and /u/ (written ⟨u⟩ or ⟨o⟩). The phoneme /u/ tended to occur when the following syllable contained an *ū in Proto-Celtic (for example, dligud /ˈdʲlʲiɣuð/ "law" (dat.) < PC *dligedū), or after a broad labial (for example, lebor /ˈLʲevur/ "book"; domun /ˈdoṽun/ "world"). The phoneme /ə/ occurred in other circumstances. The occurrence of the two phonemes was generally unrelated to the nature of the corresponding Proto-Celtic vowel, which could be any monophthong: long or short.

Long vowels also occur in unstressed syllables. However, they rarely reflect Proto-Celtic long vowels, which were shortened prior to the deletion (syncope) of inner syllables. Rather, they originate in one of the following ways:

- from the late resolution of a hiatus of two adjacent vowels (usually as a result of loss of *s between vowels);
- from compensatory lengthening in response to loss of a consonant (cenél "kindred, gender" < *cenethl; du·air-chér "I have purchased" < *-chechr, preterite of crenaid "buys";)
- from assimilation of an unstressed vowel to a corresponding long stressed vowel;
- from late compounding;
- from lengthening of short vowels before unlenited /m, N, L, R/, still in progress in Old Irish (compare erríndem "highest" vs. rind "peak".)

=== Stress ===
Stress is generally on the first syllable of a word. However, in verbs it occurs on the second syllable when the first syllable is a clitic (the verbal prefix as- in as·beir /asˈberʲ/ "he says"). In such cases, the unstressed prefix is indicated in grammatical works with a following centre dot (⟨·⟩).

== Orthography ==
As with most medieval languages, the orthography of Old Irish is not fixed, so the following statements are to be taken as generalisations only. Individual manuscripts may vary greatly from these guidelines.

The Old Irish alphabet consists of the following eighteen letters of the Latin alphabet:

a, b, c, d, e, f, g, h, i, l, m, n, o, p, r, s, t, u,

in addition to the five long vowels, shown by an acute accent (´):

á, é, í, ó, ú,

the lenited consonants denoted with a superdot (◌̇):

ḟ, ṡ,

and the eclipsis consonants also denoted with a superdot:

ṁ, ṅ.

Old Irish digraphs include the lenition consonants:

ch, fh, th, ph, sh,

the eclipsis consonants:

mb, nd, ng; ṁb, ṅd, ṅg,

the geminatives:

bb, cc, ll, mm, nn, pp, rr, tt,

and the diphthongs:

aé/áe/aí/ái, oé/óe/oí/ói,
uí, ía, áu, úa, éu, óu, iu, au, eu,
ai, ei, oi, ui; ái, éi, ói, úi.

The following table indicates the broad pronunciation of various consonant letters in various environments:

Broad consonant phonemes
Letter	Word-initial			Non-initial	
Letter	unmutated	eclipsed	lenited	single	geminate
b	/b/	⟨mb⟩ /m/	/v/		⟨bb⟩ /b/
c	/k/	/ɡ/	⟨ch⟩ /x/	/k/, /ɡ/	⟨cc⟩ /k/
d	/d/	⟨nd⟩ /N/	/ð/		—
f	/f/	/v/	⟨ḟ/fh⟩ / /	/f/	—
g	/ɡ/	⟨ng⟩ /ŋ/	/ɣ/		—
h	See explanation below				
l	/L/	—	/l/		⟨ll⟩ /L/
m	/m/	—	/ṽ/		⟨mm⟩ /m/
n	/N/	—	/n/		⟨nn⟩ /N/
p	/p/	/b/	⟨ph⟩ /f/	/p/, /b/	⟨pp⟩ /p/
r	/R/	—	/r/		⟨rr⟩ /R/
s₁	/s/	—	⟨ṡ/sh⟩ /h/	/s/	—
s₂^{1}	/s/	—	⟨f/ph⟩ /f/		—
t	/t/	/d/	⟨th⟩ /θ/	/t/, /d/	⟨tt⟩ /t/

Angle brackets ⟨⟩ here indicate graphemic differences to the unmutated consonant.
A dash (—) here indicates that the respective consonant is not subject to eclipsis. These consonants are: r, l, n, s

^{1}The s₂ arises from older *sw or *sɸ which is lenited to /f/. In Old Irish there are only several words containing s₂: sïur :: fïur, phïur, sister; sesser :: mórfesser, six persons / seven (lit. great six) persons; or in reduplicated verbs do·seinn :: do·sephainn, pursue.

When the consonants b, d, g are eclipsed by the preceding word (always from a word-initial position), their spelling and pronunciation change to: ⟨mb⟩ /m/, ⟨nd⟩ /N/, ⟨ng⟩ /ŋ/

Generally, geminating a consonant ensures its unmutated sound. While the letter ⟨c⟩ may be voiced /ɡ/ at the end of some words, but when it is written double ⟨cc⟩ it is always voiceless /k/ in regularised texts; however, even final /ɡ/ was often written "cc", as in bec / becc "small, little" (Modern Irish and Scottish beag, Manx beg).

In later Irish manuscripts, lenited f and s are denoted with the letter h ⟨fh⟩, ⟨sh⟩, instead of using a superdot ⟨ḟ⟩, ⟨ṡ⟩.

When initial s stemmed from Primitive Irish *sw-, its lenited version is ⟨f⟩ [ɸ].

The slender (palatalised) variants of the 13 consonants, transcribed in IPA with a following /ʲ/, occur in the following environments:

- Before a written e, é, i, í
- After a written i, when not followed by a vowel letter (but not after the diphthongs aí, oí, uí)

Although Old Irish has both a sound /h/ and a letter h, there is no consistent relationship between the two. Vowel-initial words are sometimes written with an unpronounced h, especially if they are very short (the Old Irish preposition i "in" was sometimes written hi) or if they need to be emphasised (the name of Ireland, Ériu, was sometimes written Hériu). On the other hand, words that begin with the sound /h/ are usually written without it: a ór /a hoːr/ "her gold". If the sound and the spelling co-occur, it is by coincidence, as ní hed /Nʲiː heð/ "it is not".

=== Stops following vowels ===
The voiceless stops of Old Irish are c, p, t. They contrast with the voiced stops g, b, d. Additionally, the letter m can behave similarly to a stop following vowels. These seven consonants often mutate when not in the word-initial position.

In non-initial positions, the single-letter voiceless stops c, p, and t become the voiced stops /ɡ/, /b/, and /d/ respectively unless they are written double. Ambiguity in these letters' pronunciations arises when a single consonant follows an l, n, or r. The lenited stops ch, ph, and th become /x/, /f/, and /θ/ respectively.

Non-initial voiceless stops ⟨c⟩, ⟨p⟩, ⟨t⟩
Old Irish	Pronunciation	English
macc	/mak/	son
bec or becc	/bʲeɡ/	small
op or opp	/ob/	refuse
bratt	/brat/	mantle
brot or brott	/brod/	goad
Lenited consonants ⟨ch⟩, ⟨ph⟩, ⟨th⟩
ech	/ex/	horse
oíph	/oif/	beauty
áth	/aːθ/	ford

The voiced stops b, d, and g become fricative /v/, /ð/, and /ɣ/, respectively—identical sounds to their word-initial lenitions.

Non-initial voiced stops ⟨g⟩, ⟨b⟩, ⟨d⟩
Old Irish	Pronunciation	English
dub	/duv/	black
mod	/moð/	work
mug	/muɣ/	slave
claideb	/klaðʲəv/	sword
claidib	/klaðʲəvʲ/	swords

In non-initial positions, the letter m usually becomes the nasal fricative /ṽ/, but in some cases it becomes a nasal stop, denoted as /m/. In cases in which it becomes a stop, m is often written double to avoid ambiguity.

Non-initial consonant ⟨m⟩
Old Irish	Pronunciation	English
dám	/daːṽ/	company
lom or lomm	/Lom/	bare

=== Stops following other consonants ===
Ambiguity arises in the pronunciation of the stop consonants (c, g, t, d, p, b) when they follow l, n, or r:

Homographs involving ⟨l⟩, ⟨n⟩, ⟨r⟩
Old Irish	Pronunciation	English
derc	/dʲerk/	hole
derc	/dʲerɡ/	red
daltae	/daLte/	fosterling
celtae	/kʲeLde/	who hide
anta	/aNta/	of remaining
antae	/aNde/	who remain

After m, the letter b is naturally a stop /b/. After d, l, r, the letter b is fricative /v/:

Consonant ⟨b⟩
Old Irish	Pronunciation	English
imb	/imʲbʲ/	butter
odb	/oðv/	knot (in a tree)
delb	/dʲelv/	image
marb	/marv/	dead

After n or r, the letter d is a stop /d/:

Consonant ⟨d⟩
Old Irish	Pronunciation	English
bind	/bʲiNʲdʲ/	melodious
cerd	/kʲeRd/	art, skill

After n, l, or r, the letter g is usually a stop /ɡ/, but it becomes a fricative /ɣ/ in a few words:

Consonant ⟨g⟩
Old Irish	Pronunciation	English
long	/Loŋɡ/	ship
delg or delc	/dʲelɡ/	thorn
argat or arggat	/arɡəd/	silver
ingen (Note: ingen /inʲɣʲən/ "daughter" < Ogam inigena < Proto-Celtic *eni-genā (cf. Latin indigenā "(female) native", Ancient Greek engónē "granddaughter").; ingen /iNʲɡʲən/ "claw, nail" < Proto-Celtic *angʷīnā < PIE *h₃n̥gʷʰ- (cf. Latin unguis).)	/inʲɣʲən/	daughter
ingen	/iNʲɡʲən/	nail, claw
bairgen	/barʲɣʲən/	loaf of bread

=== The consonants l, n, r ===
The letters l, n, r are generally written double when they indicate tense sonorants and single when they indicate lax sonorants. Originally, it reflected an actual difference between single and geminate consonants, as tense sonorants in many positions (such as between vowels or word-finally) developed from geminates. As the gemination was lost, the use of written double consonants was repurposed to indicate tense sonorants. Doubly written consonants of this sort do not occur in positions where tense sonorants developed from non-geminated Proto-Celtic sonorants (such as word-initially or before a consonant).

Old Irish	Pronunciation	English
corr	/koR/	crane
cor	/kor/	putting
coll	/koL/	hazel
col	/kol/	sin
sonn	/soN/	stake
son	/son/	sound
ingen	/inʲɣʲən/	daughter
ingen	/iNʲɡʲən/	nail, claw

Geminate consonants appear to have existed since the beginning of the Old Irish period, but they were simplified by the end, as is generally reflected by the spelling. Eventually, however, ll, mm, nn, rr were repurposed to indicate nonlenited variants of those sounds in certain positions.

=== Vowels ===
Written vowels a, ai, e, i in poststressed syllables (except when absolutely word-final) all seem to represent phonemic /ə/. The particular vowel that appears is determined by the quality (broad vs. slender) of the surrounding consonants and has no relation to the etymological vowel quality:

Preceding consonant	Following consonant	Spelling	Example
broad	broad	⟨a⟩	dígal /ˈdʲiːɣəl/ "vengeance" (nom.)
broad	slender (in open syllable)	⟨a⟩	
broad	slender (in closed syllable)	⟨ai⟩	dígail /ˈdʲiːɣəlʲ/ "vengeance" (acc./dat.)
slender	broad	⟨e⟩	dliged /ˈdʲlʲiɣʲəð/ "law" (acc.)
slender	slender	⟨i⟩	dligid /ˈdʲlʲiɣʲəðʲ/ "law" (gen.)

It seems likely that spelling variations reflected allophonic variations in the pronunciation of /ə/.

The regular insertion of the letter "i" between a written back vowel and a slender consonant has been interpreted as an indication that Old Irish speakers did pronounce such sequences with a non-phonemic palatal on-glide, so that e.g. duine /dunʲe/ was realised as [dui̯nʲe].

== History ==
Old Irish underwent extensive phonological changes from Proto-Celtic in both consonants and vowels. Final syllables were lost or transphonologized as grammatical mutations on the following word. In addition, unstressed syllables faced various reductions and deletions of their vowels.

== Grammar ==
Old Irish is a fusional, nominative-accusative, and VSO language.

Nouns decline for 5 cases: nominative, accusative, genitive, prepositional, vocative; 3 genders: masculine, feminine, neuter; 3 numbers: singular, dual, plural. Adjectives agree with nouns in case, gender, and number. The prepositional case is called the dative by convention.

Verbs conjugate for 3 tenses: past, present, future; 3 aspects: simple, perfective, imperfective; 4 moods: indicative, subjunctive, conditional, imperative; 2 voices: active, and passive; independent, and dependent forms; and simple, and complex forms. Verbs display tense, aspect, mood, voice, and sometimes portmanteau forms through suffixes, or stem vowel changes for the former four. Proclitics form a verbal complex with the core verb, and the verbal complex is often preceded by preverbal particles such as ní (negative marker), in (interrogative marker), ro (perfective marker). Direct object personal pronouns occur between the preverb and the verbal stem. Verbs agree with their subject in person and number. A single verb can stand as an entire sentence. Emphatic particles such as -sa and -se are affixed to the end of the verb.

Prepositions inflect for person and number, and different prepositions govern different cases, sometimes depending on the semantics intended.

== See also ==
- Early Irish literature
- Dictionary of the Irish Language
- Auraicept na n-Éces
- Goidelic substrate hypothesis

== Sources ==
- Jaskuła, Krzysztof (2006). Ancient Sound Changes and Old Irish Phonology. Wydawnictwo KUL. ISBN 9788373633377.
- Kortlandt, Frederik Herman Henri (2007). Italo-Celtic Origins and the Prehistory of the Irish Language. Leiden Studies in Indo-European. Vol. 14. Rodopi. ISBN 978-90-420-2177-8.
- Thurneysen, Rudolf (1998) [1946]. A Grammar of Old Irish. Translated by D. A. Binchy and Osborn Bergin. Dublin: Dublin Institute for Advanced Studies. ISBN 1-85500-161-6.
