= The High Deeds of Finn MacCool =

Book by Rosemary Sutcliff

The High Deeds of Finn Mac Cool
- First edition
- Author: Rosemary Sutcliff
- Language: English
- Genre: Mythological novel
- Publisher: The Bodley Head
- Publication date: 1967
- Publication place: United Kingdom
- Media type: Print (Hardcover)

The High Deeds of Finn Mac Cool is a children's novel by Rosemary Sutcliff and was first published in 1967. It is a retelling of the stories of Fionn mac Cumhaill and the Fenian Cycle. According to her own statements in the introduction, these stories are closer to Folklore and Fairytale, being timeless and contradictory, having organically grown from generations of storytellers; she contrasts them to the Ulster Cycle stories of Cuchulainn, which belong to the Heroic Epic, and compare with the Iliad and the Odyssey.

== Plot summary ==
The story begins with the explanation of Cormac mac Art's formation of the Fianna as a defense force for Ireland, which was originally led by Finn's father, Cumhal. Cumhal is killed by Goll mac Morna, who takes over leadership of the Fianna, and Cumhal's wife Muirne flees to give birth to Finn. The boy grows up strong in the manner of his father, studies under the poet Finn Eces, accidentally tasting the Salmon of Knowledge and thereby gaining magical powers, and ultimately regaining leadership of the Fianna by defeating the Fairy that haunts the Court of Tara, Aillén mac Midgna. Goll swears loyalty to him, and Finn rules the Fianna successfully thereafter.

Similar to Sutcliff's Arthurian novel The Sword and the Circle, most of the chapters in this novel are nearly stand-alone tales, covering many of the stories and characters associated with the Fenian Cycle. Some of these include: Finn's courtship of Sadhbh and the birth of Oisín; the tales of Diarmuid and Grainne; Niamh of the Golden Hair; the Giolla Dacker; multiple encounters with the Fair Folk; and ultimately ending with Cath Gabhra and the downfall of the Fianna.
