= Slievenamon =

Mountain in County Tipperary, Ireland

- Slievenaman
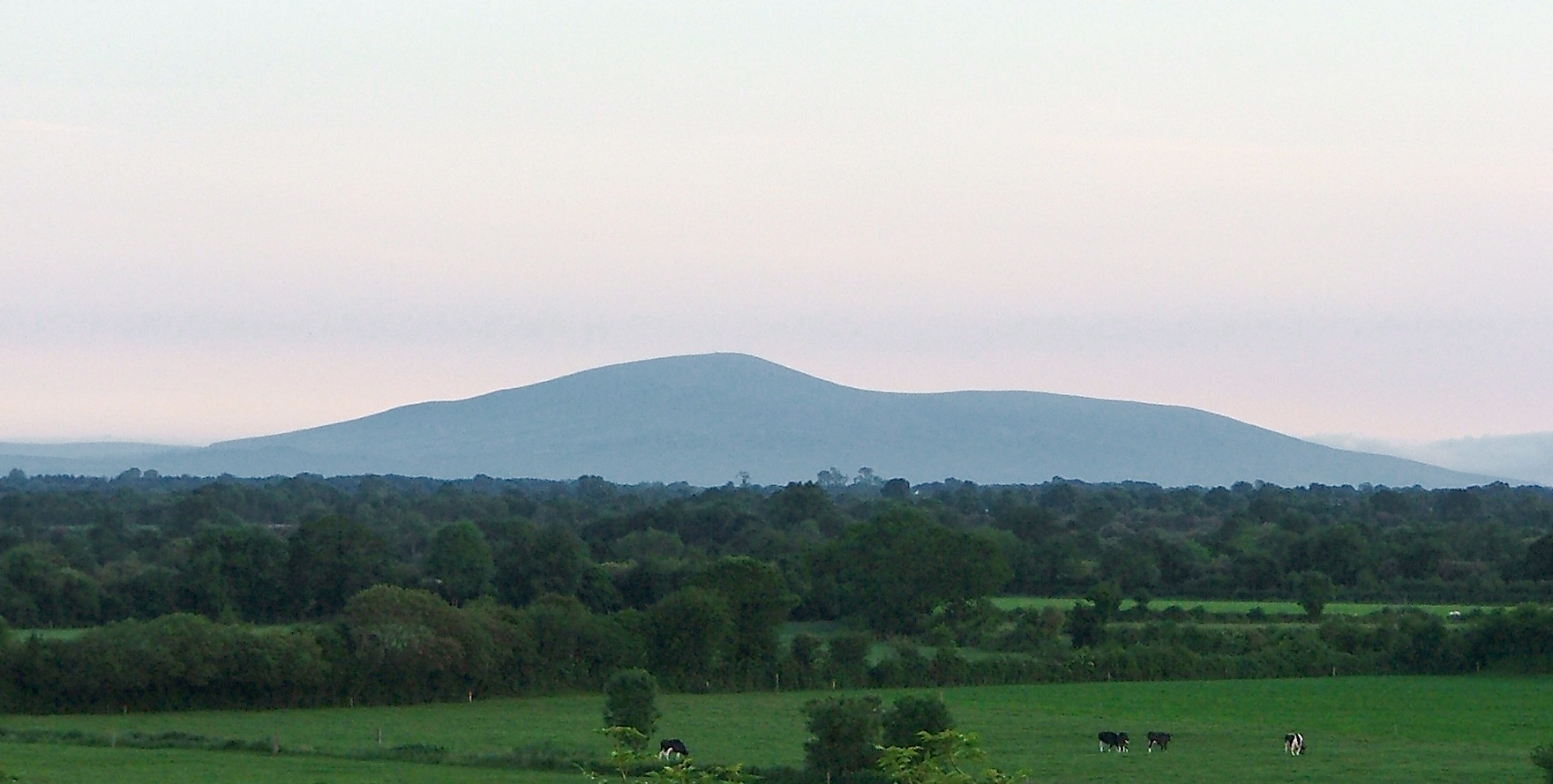
- From the northeast

Highest point
- Elevation: 721 m (2,365 ft)
- Prominence: 711 m (2,333 ft)
- Listing: P600, Marilyn, Hewitt
- Coordinates: 52.430°N 7.563°W

Naming
- Native name: Sliabh na mBan (Irish)
- English translation: "mountain of the women"
- Pronunciation: Irish: [ˈʃlʲiəw n̪ˠə ˈmˠanˠ]

Geography
- Location within island of Ireland
- Location: County Tipperary, Ireland
- OSI/OSNI grid: S297307
- Topo map: OSi Discovery 67

Slievenamon or Slievenaman (Irish: Sliabh na mBan [ˈʃl̠ʲiəw n̪ˠə ˈmˠanˠ], "mountain of the women") is a mountain with a height of 721 metres (2,365 ft) in County Tipperary, Ireland. It rises from a plain that includes the towns of Fethard, Clonmel and Carrick-on-Suir. The mountain is steeped in folklore and is associated with Fionn mac Cumhaill. On its summit are the remains of ancient burial cairns, which were seen as portals to the Otherworld. Much of Slievenamon's lower slopes are wooded, and formerly most of the mountain was covered in woodland. A low hill attached to it, Carrigmaclear, was the site of a battle during the Irish Rebellion of 1798.

== Archaeology ==
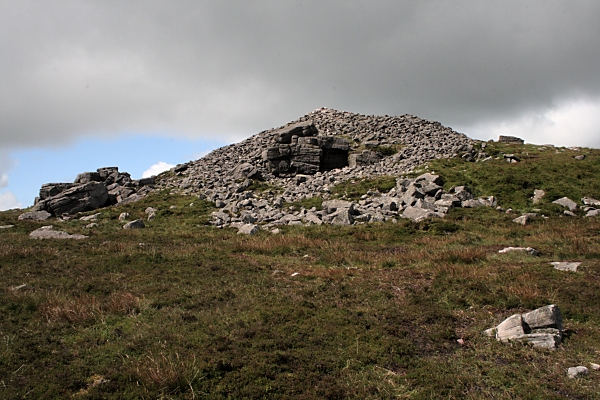
Slievenamon's summit cairn

There are at least four prehistoric monuments on Slievenamon. On the summit is an ancient burial cairn, with a natural rocky outcrop on its east side forming the appearance of a doorway. The remains of a cursus or ceremonial avenue leads up to the cairn from the east. On the mountain's northeastern shoulder, Sheegouna, is another burial cairn and a ruined megalithic tomb.

== Folklore ==
The origin of the mountain's name is explained in Irish mythology. According to the tale, the hero Fionn mac Cumhaill was sought after by many young women. Fionn stood atop the mountain and declared that whichever woman won a footrace to the top would be his wife. Since Fionn and Gráinne were in love, he had shown her a short-cut and she duly won the race. The mountain was also known by the longer name Sliabh na mBan bhFionn, 'mountain of the fair women'. Another local explanation of the name is that from a distance and the right angle, the hill resembles a woman lying on her back.

The plain from which the mountain rises was known in Old Irish as Mag Femin (modern Irish Magh Feimhin, or Má Feimhin) or the Plain of Femen. The burial cairns on the mountain are called Síd ar Femin (Sí ar Feimhin, the 'fairy mound over Femen') and Sí Ghamhnaí ('fairy mound of the calves'). They were seen as the abodes of gods and entrances to the Otherworld. Irish folklore holds that it is bad luck to damage or disrespect such tombs and that deliberately doing so could bring a curse.

In Irish mythology, one of the burial cairns is said to be the abode of the god Bodhbh Dearg, son of the Dagda. Fionn marries Sadhbh, Bodhbh's daughter, on Slievenamon, and their son is the famous Oisín.

In one tale, Fionn and his men are cooking a pig on the banks of the River Suir when an Otherworld being called Cúldubh comes out of the cairn on Slievenamon and snatches it. Fionn chases Cúldubh and kills him with a spear throw as he re-enters the cairn. An Otherworld woman inside tries to shut the door, but Fionn's thumb is caught between the door and the post, and he puts it in his mouth to ease the pain. As his thumb had been inside the Otherworld, Fionn is bestowed with great wisdom. This tale may refer to gaining knowledge from the ancestors, and is similar to the tale of the Salmon of Knowledge.

In Acallam na Senórach (Dialogue of the Elders), Fionn, Caílte and other members of the fianna chase a fawn to Slievenamon. They come upon a great illuminated hall or brugh, and inside they are welcomed by warriors and maidens of the Otherworld. Their host, Donn son of Midir, reveals that the fawn was one of the maidens, sent to draw them to Slievenamon. The fianna agree to help Donn in a battle against another group of the Tuatha Dé Danann. After a lengthy battle, Fionn compels their foes to make peace, and they return to this world.

== Cultural references ==
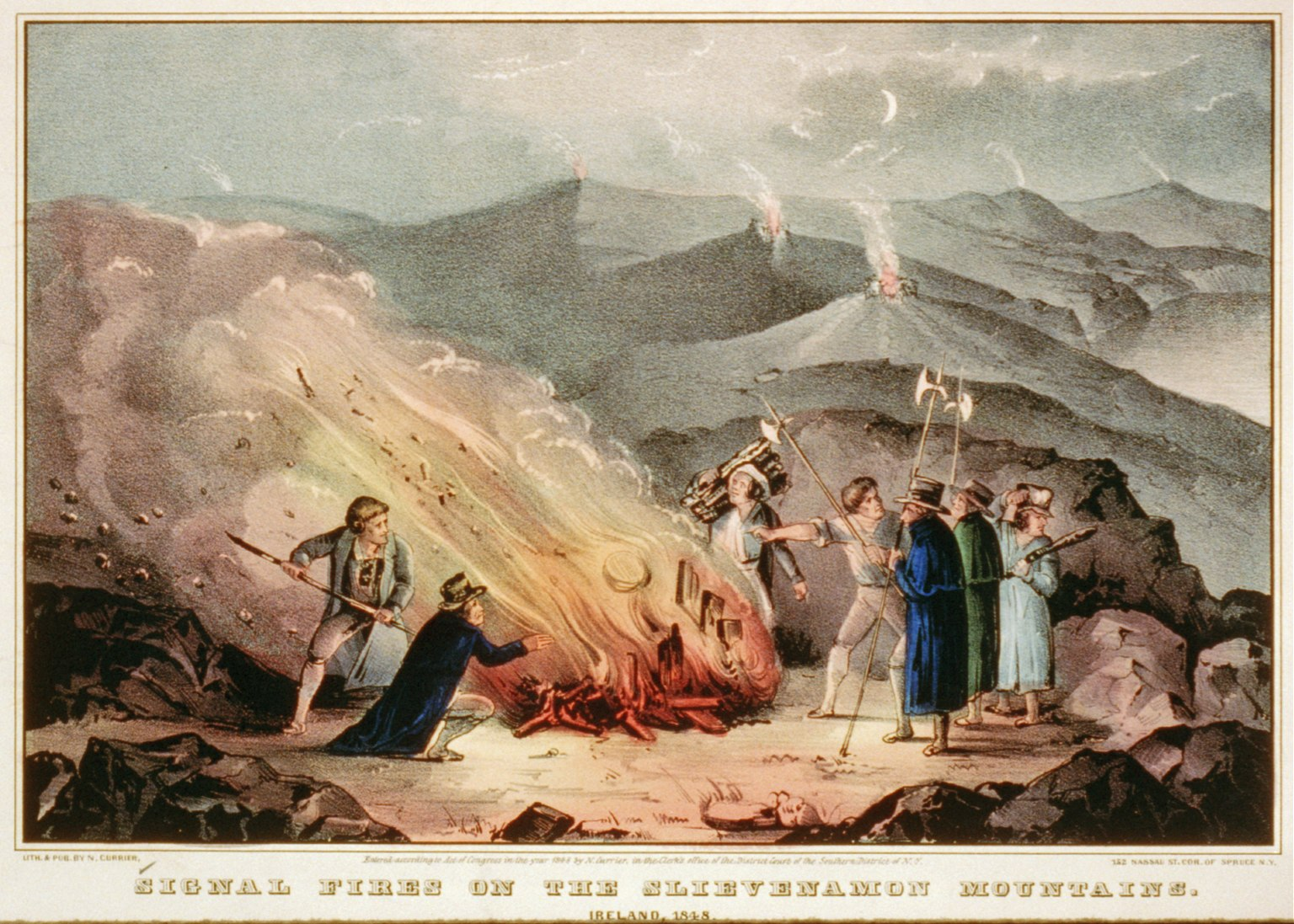
Signal fires on Slievenamon to signal the beginning of the Irish Rebellion of 1848

The song Slievenamon, written in the mid 19th century by revolutionary and poet Charles Kickham, is a well-known patriotic and romantic song about an exile who longs to see "our flag unrolled and my true love to unfold / in the valley near Slievenamon". It is regarded as the unofficial "county anthem" of County Tipperary, regularly sung by crowds at sporting events.

The mountain appears in the fairytale The Horned Woman as found in Celtic Fairy Tales (1892, by Joseph Jacobs) (used by Jacobs with permission by Lady Wilde from her "Ancient Legends of Ireland" (1887)), where it is the abode of a witches' coven. It is also mentioned in the books The Hidden Side of Things (1913) and The Lives of Alcyone (1924, with Annie Besant) written by the theosophist clairvoyant Charles Webster Leadbeater.. The mountain is referred to as Slieve-na-Mon in a fairy tale called "The Giant and the Birds" from "The Boy Who Knew What The Birds Said" by Padraic Colum (1918). In it, Big Man chases a deer into a cave and falls asleep for 200 years to awaken in a time when he is a giant among men.

Upon creation of the Irish Free State, the name Slievenamon was unofficially given to one of the 13 armoured Rolls-Royce motor cars which were handed over to the new Free State army by the outgoing administration. Slievenamon was escorting the army's commander-in-chief, Michael Collins, when he was ambushed and killed near Béal na Bláth. The car, since renamed to the Irish Sliabh na mBan, has been preserved by the Irish Defence Forces.

== Gallery ==
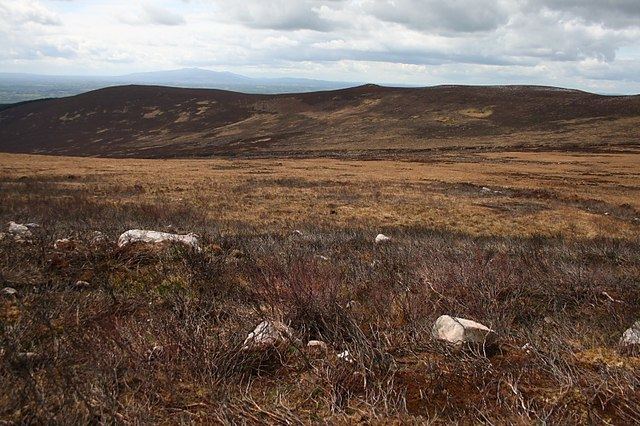
Heathland on the mountain

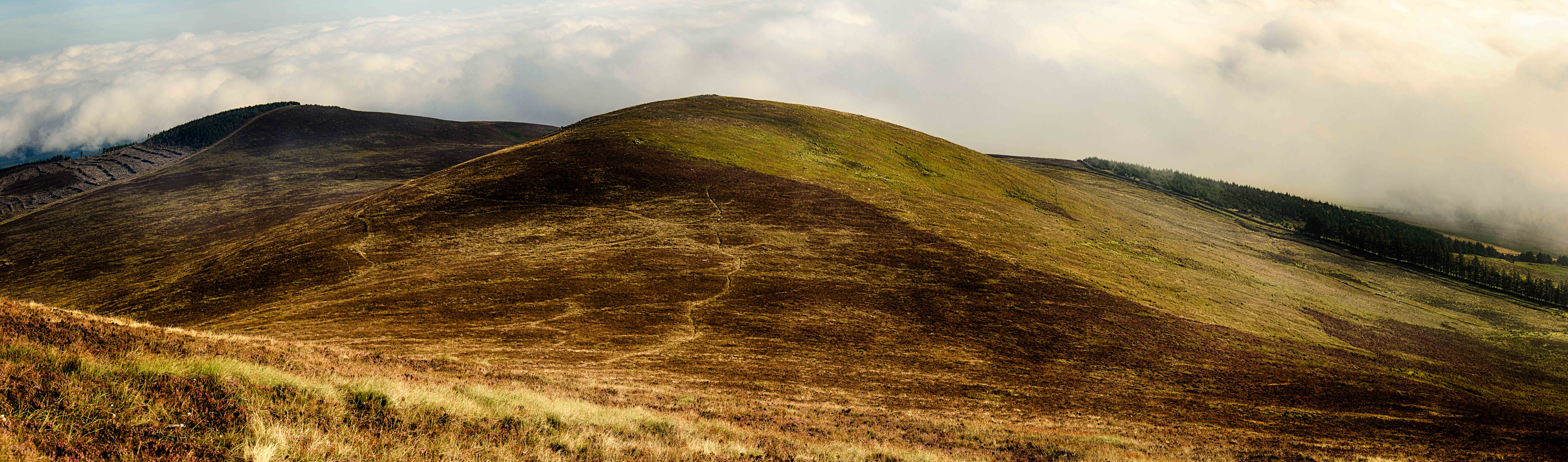
Sheegouna mountain

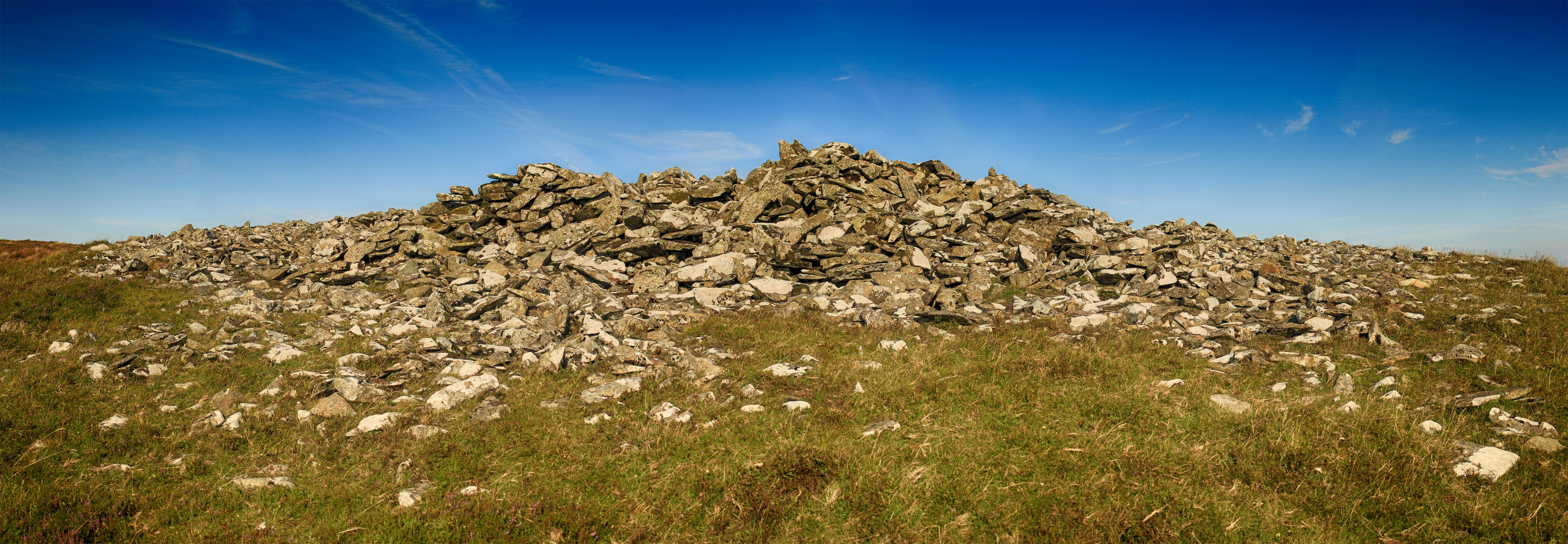
Sheegouna burial cairn

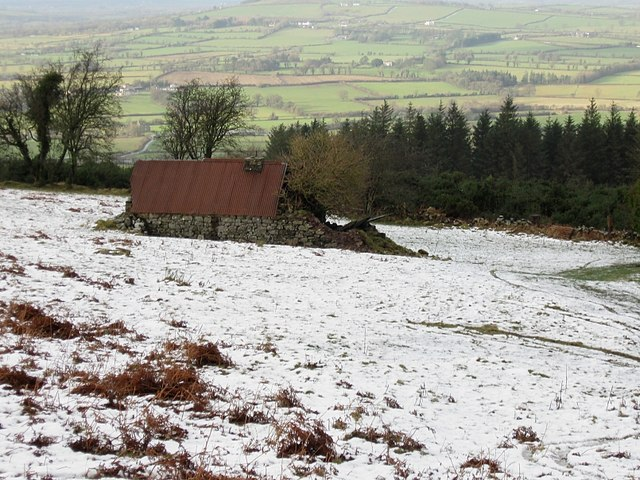
Abandoned cottage on Slievnamon

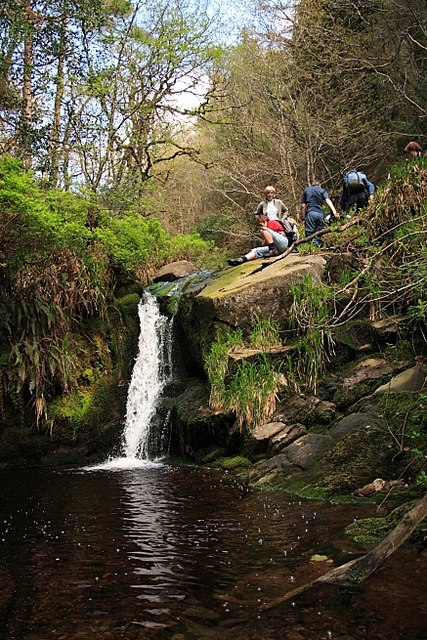
Waterfall and hikers on the Killurney stream

== See also ==
- Lists of mountains in Ireland
- List of mountains of the British Isles by height
- List of P600 mountains in the British Isles
- List of Marilyns in the British Isles
- List of Hewitt mountains in England, Wales and Ireland
