= Bodhmall =

Mythological Irish druidess

Bodhmall (or bodhmann, Bómall, Bodmall, or Bodbmall) is one of Fionn mac Cumhaill's childhood foster mothers in the Fenian Cycle of Irish mythology and the daughter of Tréanmór mac Suailt. She is a druid and the sister of Fionn's father Cumhall, and both she and her female partner Liath Luachra are known as great warriors.

Bodhmall's story appears in The Boyhood Deeds of Fionn. When Cumhall is slain by Goll mac Morna, his wife Muirne fears for their son's safety. Bodhmall and Liath Luachra come to her, and take the boy to be raised in the forest of Sliabh Bladhma. There they teach him to hunt, and accompany him on some of his early adventures. When he grows up and news of his exploits spreads, the warrior women fear he will attract the attention of Goll's men. They send him out to find his own way, having taught him all they know.
