= Tadg mac Nuadat =

Maternal grandfather of Fionn Mac Cumhail

Tadg, son of Nuada, was a druid and the maternal grandfather of Fionn Mac Cumhail in the Fenian Cycle of Irish mythology. It is unclear whether his father was the short-lived High King Nuada Necht, the god Nuada Airgetlam of the Tuatha Dé Danann, or another figure of a similar name. He lived on the hill of Almu.

Tadg had a daughter, Muirne, who was sought after by many suitors, including Cumhal, leader of the Fianna, but he refused them all, having foreseen that his daughter's marriage would result in the loss of his ancestral seat. But Cumhal abducted Muirne, so Tadg appealed to the High King, Conn of the Hundred Battles, who outlawed and pursued him. Cumhal was killed in the Battle of Cnucha at the hand of Goll mac Morna, who took over leadership of the Fianna, but Muirne was already pregnant. Tadg rejected her and ordered his people to burn her, but Conn prevented this and sent Muirne away into the protection of an ally.

Muirne's son, Fionn, was born and brought up in secret, and when he grew up he took the leadership of the Fianna from Goll, and demanded satisfaction for his father's death from Tadg, threatening war or single combat if he was refused. Tadg offered him his residence on the hill of Almu, and Fionn accepted.

Tadg's other daughter Uirne was transformed into a dog by the queen of Dal n-Araide, and gave birth to two dogs, Bran and Sceólang.
