= The Boyhood Deeds of Fionn =

Medieval Irish mythical narrative text

The Boyhood Deeds of Fionn (Old Irish: Macgnímartha Finn) is a medieval Irish narrative belonging to the Fenian Cycle of Irish mythology. As its title implies, it recounts the boyhood exploits of Fionn mac Cumhaill, the cycle's central figure.

== Origin and development ==
The most important manuscript is Laud 610: folio 118Rb-121Va, which is missing the ending; Kuno Meyer and Gerard Murphy assigned the text to the 12th century. (Note: Meyer (1910) Fianaigecht, Introduction, § Twelfth Century, p. xxviii; Murphy (1953) Duanaire Finn 3, p. xxxiv, lxv, etc. Cited by Scowcroft.)

The Laud 610 manuscript text was edited and translated by John O'Donovan as "The Boyish Exploits of Finn mac Cumhaill" in 1859, but only partly with some deficiencies according to Kuno Meyer. Meyer published an 1881 edition followed by a 1904 translation entitled "The Boyish Exploits of Finn". A more recent translation appeared in Joseph Falaky Nagy, The Wisdom of the Outlaw: Boyhood Deeds of Finn in Gaelic Narrative Tradition (1985).

The text breaks off while Fionn investigates a sídhe or fairy mound, before his trip to Tara. Scholars have pointed out similarities between earlier versions of The Boyhood Deeds of Fionn and tales of the youth of the Ulster Cycle hero Cúchulainn. For instance, The Boyhood Deeds of Cúchulainn and The Wooing of Emer, both found within the epic Táin Bó Cúailnge, recount Cúchulainn's earning of a nickname through his feats, his training by a warrior woman (Scáthach) and his earning of a deadly spear (the Gáe Bulg).

A modern retelling of the Boyhood Deeds occurs under the title "Birth of Fin Maccumhail".

== Plot ==
The story begins with the death of Fionn's father Cumhal, leader of the Fianna, at the hands of Goll mac Morna. Cumhal's wife Muirne was pregnant at the time and eventually gave birth to their son, called Demne in his youth. Fearing for his safety, she sends the boy to be raised by Cumhal's sister, the druidess Bodhmall, and her companion Liath Luachra. The two warrior women raise him and accompany him on several adventures, including one in which he receives his nickname, Fionn (the fair; the pale). As he grows, his exploits attract increasing attention, and finally his foster mothers send him away for fear that Goll's men will find him. Subsequent episodes depict his service to the king of Bantry, his recovery of Cumhal's treasures by slaying Liath Luachra (a different character than his caretaker), and his meeting with the aged and dispossessed Fianna who had fought with his father.

Fionn's wisdom

Another episode recounts how Fionn gained the ability to discover any knowledge he wanted by simply placing his thumb in his mouth. He developed this ability after inadvertently tasting the Salmon of Knowledge, a fish prophecied to give the first person to eat it all the wisdom in the world. The salmon, which dwelled in the River Boyne, was caught by Fionn's mentor, the poet Finn Éces. Who had lived on the Boyne for seven years. Fionn was given the salmon to cook, and was told not to partake in any of the salmon before serving it to him. But Fionn burnt his thumb while cooking and sucked it, thereby receiving its gift of wisdom.

Fairy mound attack

Fionn travels to the capital of Tara, which is set aflame each Samhain by Aillén the Burner, one of the Tuatha Dé Danann. Goll and the Fianna are powerless to stop it, since Aillén puts everyone to sleep with a magical tune. Fionn inhales poison from his own spear to prevent sleep, and dispatches Aillén. He reveals his identity to the court, and the king grants Fionn his rightful position as leader of the Fianna. Goll steps down, and engages in a truce with his enemy.

== Mirrors and parallels ==
Episodes about Finn and his family in the Macgnímartha Finn are also attested in other works in Irish literature. Some parallels with other Celtic or Norse culture has been discussed as well.

Cath Cnucha

The beginning episode telling of Cumhal mac Treanmhor's death is given in the narrative Cath Cnucha. A 17th century tale, "The Fight of Castle Knoc" discusses Cumhal's death and Liath Luachra's taking of the Corrbolg (construed as armor here, though this is Crane-bag elsewhere).

Wisdom

As for the acquisition of wisdom by tasting the salmon, this has been compared to the Welsh episode where Ceridwen's condensed brew in the cauldron of wisdom was unintendedly tasted by her son Gwion. Another close parallel is Sigurd the dragon-slayer who burns his finger cooking the heart of the dragon Fáfnir, and subsequently gains the ability to understand the conversation of birds.
