= Adhnúall =

Celtic mythological animal

Adhnúall or Adnual (Old Irish: Adnúall, lit. 'Sweet of sound') is a Celtic mythological animal, one of the hunting dogs of Fionn mac Cumhaill.

The dog was once stolen by Arthur, son of the king of Britain. He was reclaimed by the Fianna. It was said that Adhnúall led Sadhbh, Fionn's would-be lover, into Fionn's heart.

Adhnúall died of sorrow following a battle in Leinster where many of the Fianna were killed. Before his death, he ran the circuit of Ireland three times. After which he returned to the battlefield, at a spot on a hill where three Fenians and their lovers were buried, let loose three howls and died.

Adhnúall appears less regularly than Bran and Sceólang, the primary hunting dogs of Fionn mac Cumhaill.
