= Muireann =

Muireann (Irish pronunciation: [ˈmˠɪɾʲən̪ˠ]; Old Irish: Muirenn) is an Irish-language feminine given name.

== Notable people with the name ==
=== Muireann ===
- Muireann Bradley
- Muireann Irish
- Muireann Nic Amhlaoibh
- Muireann Ní Bhrolcháin
- Muireann O'Connell

=== Muirenn ===
- Muirne, mother of Fionn mac Cumhaill
- Muirenn ingen Cellach Cualann, Queen of Brega, died 748.
- Muirenn ingen Cellaig, Abbess of Kildare, died 831.
- Muirenn ingen Suairt, Abbess of Kildare, fl. 909, died 916.
- Muirenn ingen mic Colmáin, Abbess of Kildare, died 962.
- Muirenn ingen Congalaig, Abbess of Kildare, died 979.

== See also ==
- List of Irish-language given names
