= Liath Luachra =

Characters in Irish mythology

Liath Luachra or the "Grey one of Luachair", is the name of two characters in the Fenian Cycle of Irish mythology. Both appear in The Boyhood Deeds of Fionn, which details the young life and adventures of the hero Fionn mac Cumhaill. Alfred Nutt for example distinguished the two as figures of different gender.

The first Liath Luachra is one of Fionn's foster mothers who raise him after the death of his father Cumhal at the hands of Goll mac Morna. She is a great warrior and a companion of Fionn's aunt, the druidess Bodhmall; together they raise the boy in secret in the forest of Sliabh Bladhma. Eventually Fionn's ever-spreading fame threatens to bring his father's killers to him, and his caretakers send him to find his own way. By this point they have taught him enough that he can survive on his own, and he goes into the king of Bantry's service.

The second Liath Luachra is a tall, hideous warrior and a member of the Fianna. He had been an enemy of Cumhal, and even dealt him the first blow in the battle at which he died. Later Goll mac Morna gave him possession of Cumhal's treasures, and made him the Fianna's official treasurer. His corrbolg or crane bag is one of the warrior band's great treasures. Eventually he kills a young warrior named Glonda; Fionn sees the man's mother crying blood over the murder and decides to avenge him. He kills Liath easily and takes his treasure from him. This Liath has a son, Conán mac Lia, who becomes lord of Luchair and a marauder against Fionn and the Fianna. He is eventually reconciled with the group and joins them.
