= Irish Fairy Tales =

1920 book by James Stephens

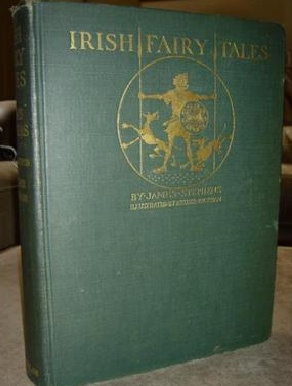
- Cover of the first edition, 1920
- Author: James Stephens
- Illustrator: Arthur Rackham
- Cover artist: Arthur Rackham
- Genre: Folktale
- Publisher: Macmillan & Co.
- Publication date: 1920
- Publication place: United Kingdom
- Media type: Print (hardcover)
- OCLC: 6835250
- LC Class: PZ8.S58 Ir
- Preceded by: Reincarnations (1918)
- Followed by: Dierdre (1923)

Irish Fairy Tales is a retelling of ten Irish folktales by the Irish author James Stephens. The English illustrator Arthur Rackham provided interior artwork, including numerous black and white illustrations and sixteen color plates. The stories are set in a wooded, Medieval Ireland filled with larger-than-life hunters, warriors, kings, and fairies. Many stories concern the Fianna and their captain, Fionn mac Uail, from the Fenian Cycle of Irish mythology.

The book was first published by Macmillan and Company in 1920. It is one of Stephens' better-known works.

== Stories and Plot Summary ==
=== The Story of Tuan mac Cairill ===
Finnian, the Abbott of Moville, travels to the home of Tuan mac Cairill and compels Tuan to admit him. The abbott convinces Tuan of the truth of the Gospel. Finnian asks Tuan to describe his past. Tuan reveals that he is centuries old and was one of the original settlers of Ireland. Tuan lost consciousness in a violent storm and woke to find himself transformed into a powerful stag. Tuan passes through a number of lives: as a stag, a boar, a hawk, and a salmon. As a salmon, Tuan is caught, roasted, and eaten by the queen of Ireland. He is reborn as her son.

=== The Boyhood of Fionn ===
Fionn is the son of Uail mac Baiscne, captain of the Fianna of Ireland. Uail was killed by members of clann-Morna, who desired to lead the Fianna. To protect Fionn from clann-Morna, his mother sends him to be raised in the forest by two druids, Bovmall and Lia Luachra. These women nurture Fionn and train him to run, jump, and swim. When Fionn is an old boy, his location is discovered by the Mornas, but he evades them by hiding in a tree. His location compromised, Fionn accompanies a band of poets on their travels. A robber kills the poets. Upon realising Fionn's identity, the robber reveals that he is Fiacuil mac Cona, one of Uail mac Baiscne's comrades in arms. Fiacuil takes in Fionn. The boy lives in the robber's den for years. Eventually, clann-Morna learns of Fionn's location, so Fionn strikes off on his own. He serves under two kings but leaves the service of each when he feels his identity to be in jeopardy. Fionn then spends years in service to the wise poet Finegas, who educates Fionn and eventually gives him the Salmon of Knowledge to eat. At this point, Fionn is a young man, both strong and wise.

Fionn leaves the poet and attends a Samhain feast at Tara, seat of the High King of Ireland. He announces his identity and is given a seat of honour. Each Samhain, the fairy Aillen mac Midna is known to attack the city and cause much destruction. Fionn volunteers to defend the city against Aillen. As he approaches the fairy, Fiacuil emerges from the forest and offers Fionn his magical spear, with which he will be able to resist the sorcery of Aillen. Fionn accepts the spear and uses it to defend himself from Aillen's magic. Fionn chases Aillen and kills him shortly before Aillen can escape into Faery. Fionn returns to Tara, where the High King offers him any reward. Fionn asks to be made the captain of the Fianna. The High King grants this request, and the warriors present (including the warriors of clann-Morna) offer their services to Fionn.

=== The Birth of Bran ===
Tuiren, the young sister of Fionn's mother, is famed for her beauty. She marries an Ulster gentleman, Iollan Eachtach. Iollan formerly had a fairy lover, Uct Dealv, who became furious that Tuiren had stolen Iollan from her. Uct Dealv takes the shape of a messenger, approaches Iollan's castle, and indicates that she has a message for Tuiren from Fionn. When Tuiren emerges, Uct Dealv transforms her into a dog. Uct Dealv brings the dog to Fergus Fionnliath, a man famed for his hatred of dogs. She tells Fergus that Fionn has ordered him to care for the dog until Fionn asks for its return. Fergus reluctantly agrees. Tuiren manages to win over Fergus, who abandons his hatred of dogs.

Eventually, Fionn learns that Tuiren is no longer living with Iollan, and he demands her return. Iollan travels to Uct Dealv and begs her to reveal what she has done with Tuiren. After exacting a promise of eternal loyalty from Iollan, Uct Dealv accompanies him to the home of Fergus and changes Tuiren back into a human. Tuiren returns to Fionn with two puppies she has mothered, Bran and Sceólan. These become Fionn's favourite dogs. Fergus is heartbroken at losing his dog, so Fionn sends him a new puppy, which quickly cheers him up.

=== Oisin's Mother ===
On a hunt, Fionn's dogs Bran and Sceólan will not attack a particular fawn, who appears tame. Fionn decides to take the fawn back to his camp. That night, a fairy woman named Saeve enters Fionn's room and begs for his protection from the evil magician Doirche. She also offers Fionn her hand in marriage. Fionn gladly accepts and promises to protect Saeve.

Later, Fionn leads the Fianna to fight off an incursion of men from Lochlann. After the battle, he returns to find Saeve gone and his home in chaos. His butler explains that a figure who looked like Fionn approached the castle, and Saeve ran out to meet him. The man transformed Saeve into a deer, and the pair vanished. Fionn spends years searching Ireland for this deer, but he cannot locate it. After seven years, he finds a young boy in the forest whom he recognises as his and Saeve's son. The boy tells Fionn of his years spent in Faery, during which time Doirche kept him and his mother (still in deer form) in a cave, before finally ejecting the boy. Fionn names the boy Oisin.

=== The Wooing of Becfola ===
The High King and the prince Crimthann are hunting in the forest. They encounter a beautiful woman driving a chariot. The High King asks for her name, where she is from, and what she is doing. The woman refuses to provide any information. The High King asks for her hand in marriage. The woman accepts, though she has fallen in love with Crimthann and would prefer to marry him. The king names the woman Becfola.

Long after, Becfola is living in Tara with the High King. She reveals her feelings to Crimthann and they make a plan to flee Tara. When Becfola attempts to rendezvous with Crimthann, she is misdirected by fairies and ends up lost in the forest. She escapes from hungry wolves, meets a traveller, and accompanies him to a small island where he fights seven men for the lordship of the island. Thereafter, he escorts Becfola back to Tara, and she realises that no time has passed since she left. She decides not to follow through on her plan to meet Crimthann.

The next day, at a feast, a cleric is present who witnessed the fight for lordship of the small island. He saw Becfola there and accuses her of unfaithfulness. Becfola admits her guilt and leaves Tara forever.

=== The Little Brawl at Allen ===
Goll mac Morna, the most renowned member of clann-Morna, attends a feast with the other Fianna. He insults his captain, Fionn, by giving gifts to the bards and entertainers more lavish than those offered by Fionn. Fionn asks where he acquired so much wealth. Goll recounts that he obtained it on campaign in Lochlann, where he killed not only the men of Lochlann but also Fionn's father. The discussion quickly degenerates into boasts, threats, and finally a large brawl. In the end, 1100 of Fionn's people were killed, while clann-Morna only suffered losses of 61. Fionn insists that he will not make peace with clann-Morna until the High King has pronounced judgment on the attack.

They travel to Tara and give testimony to the High King, his son, and his daughter. It is determined that clann-Morna was attacked first, and therefore owes no damages, while Fionn's heavy losses count as his damages. Therefore, neither side shall pay the other. Despite the family feud, Fionn and Goll remain personal friends.

=== The Carl of the Drab Coat ===
Cael of the Iron, son of the King of Thessaly, arrives in Ireland on a ship. He challenges the Fianna to present a champion who can out-fight, out-wrestle, or out-race him. If they cannot, he insists that Ireland pay him tribute and grant him sovereignty. Fionn decides that the contest shall be a race, and he seeks to locate Caelta mac Ronán, the fastest warrior of the Fianna. On the way, he encounters an enormous, sloppily-dressed man who calls himself The Carl of the Drab Coat. Carl insists that only he can outrun Cael. Fionna believes The Carl and selects him as the champion of the Fianna.

Cael of the Iron insists upon a sixty-mile race. He is insulted by Fionn's choice of a champion who appears to be a commoner or beggar. Cael and Carl travel to the race's starting point, while the Fianna wait at the finish. The Carl wants to sleep late, so he offers Cael a one-hour headstart. After waking, The Carl passes Cael, but is himself overtaken when he stops to eat blackberries. As The Carl passes Cael a second time, Cael points out that The Carl's two coattails were torn off when they became snagged on plants thirty miles back. The Carl runs back to retrieve his coattails, then passes Cael again and wins the race. Upon reaching the finish, Cael draws his sword and charges The Carl. The Carl hits Cael with a fist full of blackberries, tosses him onto his ship, and sends him back to Thessaly. The Carl reveals himself to be a powerful lord of the Sidhe.

=== The Enchanted Cave of Cesh Corran ===
A fairy king with a grudge against Fionn has four very ugly daughters. While the Fianna are out hunting, he sends three of his daughters to a cave near Fionn and his companion, Conán. They notice the women and approach the cave, where fairy magic makes them weak. The sisters tie them up and hide them in the cave. As the Fianna return in groups of two or three, they are drawn to the cave and captured. Finally, only Goll mac Morna remains free. The sisters attempt to kill him, but Goll slays two of them, and the third surrenders. The fourth daughter of the fairy king appears. She is a powerful warrior. Goll barely defeats her in battle. As a reward, Fionn offers the hand of his daughter in marriage to Goll.

=== Becuma of the White Skin ===
Becuma, a woman from the many-colored land beyond Faery, is banished to Ireland for running away from her husband. Conn, an important king, notices Becuma arrive by boat. Becuma admits that Conn's son, Art, is known in the many-coloured land and she has fallen in love with Art. Conn asks Becuma to marry him, not his son. Becuma agrees on condition that he send his son away for a year to give her time to learn to love Conn without distraction.

When Art returns, Ireland is in the midst of a great famine. Conn hears a prophecy that he must sacrifice the son of a sinless couple to end the famine. After a long journey, he locates such a boy: the son of a king and queen on a remote island. He claims that he must borrow their son, who must bathe in the waters of Ireland, to break the famine. The parents are reluctant, but the boy insists on accompanying Conn back to Ireland. Upon Conn's arrival, it is revealed that he is to be sacrificed, not bathed. He objects to this change of plan, and much debate about what to do breaks out in Ireland. Eventually, the boy is convinced to be a sacrifice. When the boy is about to be executed, his mother appears. She reveals that sacrificing her son will not end the famine. The famine will only be broken when Becuma is gone.

Becuma challenges Art to a game of chess and loses. As a penalty, Art instructs her to leave Ireland until she locates the wand of Curoi, a task he hopes will be impossible. Becuma uses her contacts in Faery to locate it quickly, and she retrieves it. Becuma challenges Art to a second game of chess and wins. Becuma instructs Art to leave Ireland until he locates Delvcaem, daughter of the magician Morgan. Art undergoes a long quest full of trials and dangers before finding Delvcaem imprisoned by her parents. Art slays Morgan and his wife, marries Delvcaem, and returns with her to Ireland.

Upon reaching Ireland, Delvcaem orders Becuma to leave and never return. Becuma leaves Ireland and becomes a queen in a far-off country.

=== Mongan's Frenzy ===
A storyteller relates a story about Mongan, king of Ulster: Mongan, his wife, his storyteller, and several of his guards attend a tournament. It begins to hail. As they flee the hail, they wander into Faery and come to a small palace. There, they feast and Mongan agrees to tell a story about his past:

Eolgarg Mor, the king of Lochlann, is ill. A doctor indicates that only a white cow with red ears can save him. Fiachna Finn, prince of Ulster, locates such a cow. It is owned by the Black Hag, who only agrees to relinquish when Fiachna promises to replace it with four other cows. As Fiachna delivers the white cow, he is informed that his father has died and he is the new king of Ulster. He forgets his promise and returns to Ireland.

A year later, the Black Hag appears in Fiachna's court and demands that Fiachna repay her by making war against Eolgarg Mor. Fiachna reluctantly agrees and leads an army to Lochlann. They are defeated by Eolgarg Mor's venomous sheep. Manannán, the son of Lir, offers to rescue the survivors and help them defeat Eolgarg Mor in return for all the rights of Fiachna's crown and household for one day. Fiachna agrees. He defeats Eolgarg Mor, becomes king of Lochlann, and repays the Black Hag to her satisfaction.

Manannán fathers a child, Mongan, with Fiachna's wife. Mongan is raised by Manannán until the age of 16. During this time, a neighbouring king kills Fiachna and is crowned king of Ulster. When Mongan returns, he kills this king and marries his daughter, Duv Laca. Mongan is now king of Ulster.

One day, Mongan visits Branduv, King of Leinster. Branduv owns a herd of irresistible white cows with red ears. Branduv offers to trade his cows for Mongan's wife, Duv Laca. Mongan agrees and takes the cows home with him. Branduv soon visits to claim his prize. He takes Duv Laca and her maid back to Leinster with him. Mongan's servant, mac an Dáv, points out that Duv Laca's maid was his wife, so he too has lost his wife through Mongan's hasty bargain. The two men make three attempts to reclaim their wives. First they impersonate clerics, then they try to sneak in when Branduv is away, both without success. Finally, Mongan uses magic to make a hag appear to be a beautiful young woman, and Branduv unwittingly trades Duv Laca and her maid for the hag.
