= Uirne =

Mother of Bran and Sceólang

Uirne, or Tuirn(e), ("sharp-mouth") was the sister of Muirne and the aunt of Fionn mac Cumhail in the Fenian Cycle of Irish mythology.

The daughter of the druid Tadg mac Nuadat, Uirne is married three times. First, she and Conall have a son named Dáire. Then, she is wed to Imcad, the son of the king of Dal n-Araide. The queen transforms a pregnant Uirne into a dog, and her offspring from that union, Bran and Sceólang, are born as dogs. Finally, she and her third husband, Lugaid Lága, have three human children: Eogan Ruad, Sciath Brecc, and Cael Croda.

It has been argued by at least one scholar that Uirne is actually a variant of Muirne, and not a separate figure.
