= Conán mac Lia =

Fian warrior

Conán mac Lia is a figure in the Fenian Cycle of Irish mythology. A member of the warrior band the fianna, he is, in a way, less famous than the group's other Conán, Conán mac Morna.

Conán mac Lia is the son of Liath Luachra, a member of the warrior band the fianna and slain by Fionn mac Cumhaill. Conán eventually becomes lord of Luachra and a marauder against the Fianna. One day he is defeated in Munster, and Fionn makes peace with him, after which he joins the band. He marries Finnine, the sister of Ferdoman, but mistreats her (in one version he kills her). Ferdoman duels Conán over the offense, and both men die in the fight.
