= Baíscne =

Baíscne (large tree or stalwart) were a clan in the Fenian Cycle. Their rival clan was the clan Morna.

The name was given to followers of the mythical hero Fionn Mac Cumhaill.
