= Salmon of Knowledge =

Creature/character in Irish mythology

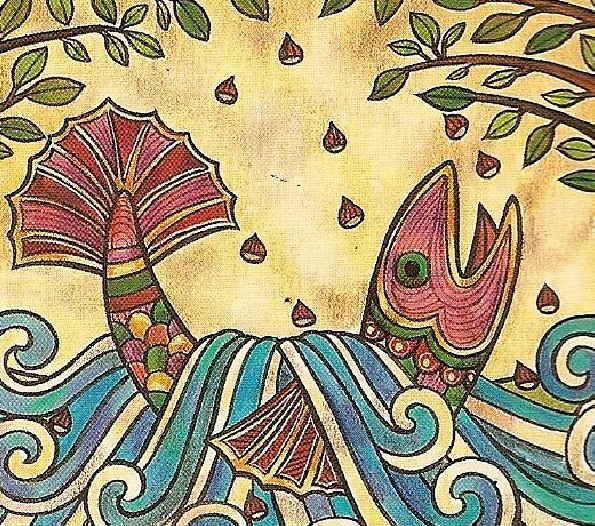
- The salmon eating the hazelnuts that are falling into the Well of Wisdom

Creature information
- Other name: Bradán Feasa
- Grouping: Irish Mythology
- Sub grouping: Mythical fish

Origin
- Country: Ireland

The Salmon of Knowledge (Irish: An Bradán Feasa) is a creature in the Fenian Cycle of Irish mythology, sometimes identified with the mythical seer Fintan mac Bóchra who was known as "The Wise" and was once transformed into a salmon.

== Fenian Cycle ==
The Salmon story figures prominently in The Boyhood Deeds of Fionn, which recounts the early adventures of Fionn mac Cumhaill. In the story, an ordinary salmon ate nine hazelnuts that fell into the Well of Wisdom (an Tobar Segais) from nine hazel trees that surrounded the well. By this act, the salmon gained all the world's knowledge. The first person to eat of its flesh would in turn gain this knowledge.

The poet Finn Eces (or Finegas) spent seven years fishing for this salmon. Finally Finn caught the salmon and gave the fish to Fionn, his servant and son of Cumhall, with instructions to cook it but on no account eat any of it. Fionn cooked the salmon, turning it over and over, but when he touched the fish with his thumb to see if it was cooked, he burnt his finger on a drop of hot cooking fish fat. Fionn sucked on his burned finger to ease the pain. Little did Fionn know that all the salmon's wisdom had been concentrated into that one drop of fat. When he brought the cooked meal to Finn Eces, his master saw that the boy's eyes shone with a previously unseen wisdom. Finn Eces asked Fionn if he had eaten any of the salmon. Answering no, the boy explained what had happened. Finn Eces realized that Fionn had received the wisdom of the salmon, so gave him the rest of the fish to eat. Fionn ate the salmon and in so doing gained all the knowledge of the world. For the rest of his life, Fionn could draw upon this knowledge merely by biting his thumb. The deep knowledge and wisdom gained from the Salmon of Knowledge allowed Fionn to become the leader of the Fianna, the famed heroes of Irish myth.

== Related mythologies ==
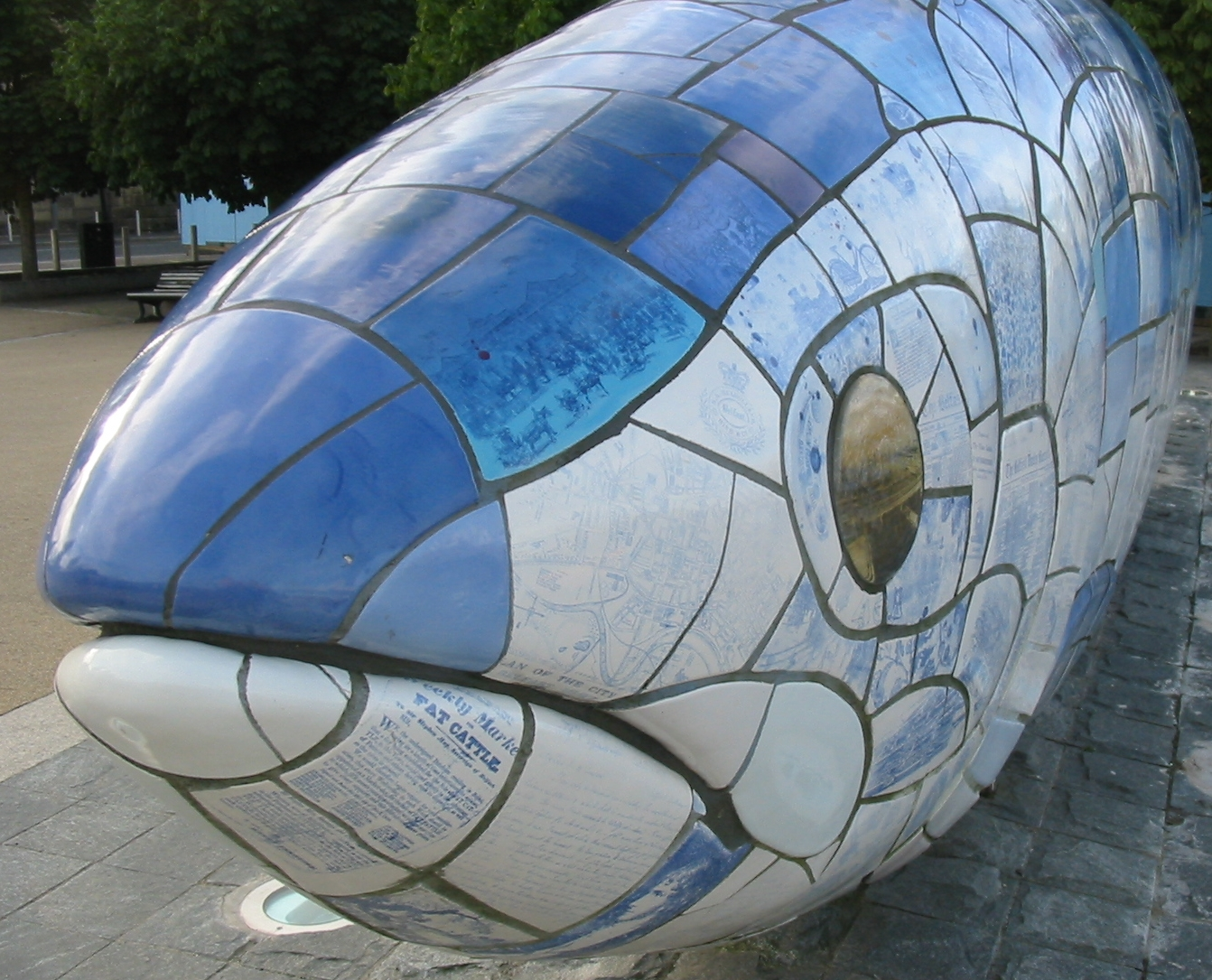
Scales on the Big Fish or Salmon of Knowledge sculpture, which celebrates the return of fish to the River Lagan

In Irish mythology, several primordial beings that personify old age and ancient knowledge are described as taking the shape of a salmon. Most notably, this includes Fintan mac Bóchra and Tuan mac Cairill.

The Welsh Hanes Taliesin (16th c.) has a similar story of how the poet Taliesin received his wisdom, that also involves shape-shifting into the form of a fish.

Heinrich Zimmer suggested that the episode may have been transferred from Scandinavia as part of the heritage of the Norse-Gaels. This is supported by further circumstantial evidence regarding Norse motifs in the Fenian cycle, including his suggestion that the name of the Fianna can be traced back to an Irish rendering of Old Norse fiandr "enemies (pl.)" > "brave enemies" > "brave (free) warriors" (Zimmer 1891, p. 15ff),.

In the Icelandic Völsunga saga (late 13th century), these motifs also recur: Odin, Loki, and Hœnir slew an otter that they later found to be Ótr, the son of the dwarf Hreiðmarr. The treasure Hreiðmarr was receiving as ransom was then protected by his son Fáfnir, who took the shape of a worm or dragon. On behalf of his brother Regin, Fáfnir was later slain by Sigurð. Regin asked Sigurð to cook Fáfnir's heart for him to eat, but, like Fionn, Sigurð tasted it and gained knowledge of the speech of birds. Thus he learnt about Regin's treachery and confronted him. Similarly, Saxo Grammaticus (Gesta Danorum, V.2.6-V.2.8, 12th c.) describes how Eric acquired eloquence and wisdom by eating the snake-infested stew his step-mother Kraka had prepared for his half-brother Roller.

The motif is well-known in European folktales and corresponds to Aarne–Thompson type 673 (KHM 17, see The White Serpent's Flesh), frequently found in Central and Eastern Europe, but also in Scotland, Ireland, Scandinavia, in the Baltic countries and occasionally also outside Europe. As both the majority of fairy tales and the Germanic versions point to a serpent being digested, but not a salmon, it seems likely that the salmon is a substitute for an original serpent.

== In popular culture ==
In the 1973 movie The Wicker Man directed by Robin Hardy, a villager dresses up as the Salmon of Knowledge during the May Day celebrations. In 2019, the Dublin-based Gilla Band released "The Salmon of Knowledge" on their album The Talkies, which takes its title and some thematic content from the folk tale. Patti Smith remembers Salmon story as a source of her inspiration in her childhood.

In season 2 of BBC's "Rogue Heroes" television series, the story is told by Paddy Mayne's character as he and another soldier are sitting in a boat.

== See also ==
- Mead of poetry
- Hallucinogenic fish

== Sources ==
- The boyhood of Fin mac Cumhal In: T. W. Rolleston (ed.) The High Deeds of Finn and other Bardic Romances of Ancient Ireland, G. G. Harrap & Co., 1910, pp. 106–115.
- The Salmon of Knowledge Celtic.org. Retrieved 14 December 2011.
- The Boyhood Deeds of Finn mac Cumhaill
