= Bran and Sceólang =

Hounds of Fionn mac Cumhaill

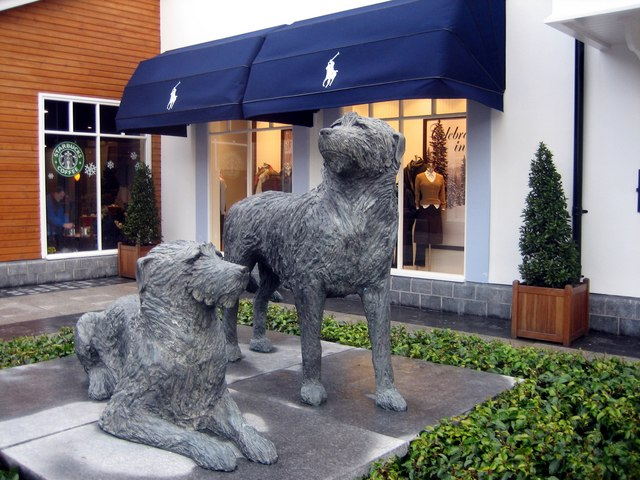
- Statue of Bran and Sceólang outside the Kildare Village outlet centre, Kildare, Ireland

Creature information
- Family: Fionn mac Cumhaill, Uirne

Origin
- Country: Ireland, Scotland
- Region: British Isles

Bran and Sceólang ("raven" and "survivor") are the hounds of Fionn mac Cumhaill in the Fenian Cycle of Irish mythology.

== Description ==
The dogs are described as being mostly white, with purple haunches, a crimson tail, blue feet, and standing as tall as Fionn's shoulder. Other sources describe Bran as having red ears, a green back, white underbelly, black sides, and yellow feet. Bran is usually male, while Sceólang is usually female, although there definitely is a version by Soinbhe Lally, where Bran is female, and Sceolang's sex is unconfirmed. Bran is also sometimes described as a merle.

== Mythology ==
The hounds' mother, Uirne, was transformed into a dog while pregnant, hence the canine birth of her twin children. While Uirne is returned to full humanity after giving birth to her pups, Bran and Sceólang remain hounds throughout the duration of their mythos. As Uirne is the sister of Fionn's mother Muirne, Bran and Sceólang would be their masters' cousins. In other versions, Uirne is Fionn's sister and Bran and Sceólang are his niece/s and/or nephew/s.

The dogs appear throughout the Fenian Cycle. In particular, throughout Fionn's hunts, it is mentioned that Bran is always by his side, while certain later folk tales suggest that the dogs grew up alongside each other. Per legend, they were the first to discover Fionn's son Oisín wandering naked in the forest. Bran had one offspring, a black and white female pup. The woman tasked with caring for the pup took some of its food (cows milk) for herself. This sent the pup into a hunger-induced rage where it attacked a flock of wild swans and would be killed when it couldn't be stopped.

Sceólang eventually dies in the 'Chase of Thrush Glen', after pursuing a half-black and half-white doe. (Thrush Glen is Glenasmole, in the mountains of south Co Dublin, favourite hunting place of the Fianna, and also where Fionn's son Oisín is reputed to have returned to Ireland from Tír na nÓg.) Bran, meanwhile, chooses to die by drowning after being struck by Fionn in an impulsive moment. Other sources say that Bran was killed by Fionn in a hunting accident, and that would then be buried by Fionn at Carnawaddy, near Omeath.

== See also ==
- Adhnúall, another of Fionn mac Cumhaill's hunting dogs.
