= Finn Eces =

Irish poet

Finn Eces (Finneces, Finegas, Finnegas) is a legendary Irish poet and sage, according to the Fenian Cycle of Irish mythology. He is the teacher of Fionn mac Cumhaill, according to the tale The Boyhood Deeds of Fionn. For years he tries to catch the Salmon of Wisdom, a fish that will grant all the world's knowledge to whoever eats it. He is unsuccessful until he takes the young Fionn as his charge, but when Fionn cooks for him, he burns his thumb and puts it in his mouth. He therefore receives the fish's knowledge, which he can access by putting his thumb in his mouth again. Upon eating the salmon he recommends Finn take up the name Finn to fulfill the prophecy as to who will gain its wisdom, originally he was named Demne.

Nuada is referred to in some sources as Nuadu Finn-Éces, and certain authors suggest that the story of Fionn Mac Cumhall and the salmon of knowledge is related to the cult of Nodens or Nuada, which was introduced into the Boyne Valley mythological corpus some time in the early centuries BC. Nuada was integrated into Fenian lore as an ancestor of Fionn, the name Finn-Ecas meaning "Finn the Seer."

== Notes ==
- Ó hÓgáin, Dáithí, Myth, Legend and Romance, an Encyclopedia of Irish Folk Tradition, New York, 1991. Entry under Find.
