= Fear Doirich =

Villainous druid in Irish mythology

Fear Doirich (literally Dark Man), sometimes written as far dorocha, is a villainous druid in Irish mythology in events surrounding the hero Fionn mac Cumhaill and his wife Sadhbh. He is sometimes described as a malevolent fairy, acting as a butler-like servant of the Fairy Queen.

== In myth ==
According to the myth, Fear Doirich had sought Sadhbh to wife, but transformed her into a deer or fawn when she refused his advances. Fionn encountered her while hunting and his hounds Bran and Sceólang recognized her as an enchanted human, having themselves been born of a woman who had been changed into a hound. Fionn's land proved to be the one place where Fear Doirich's spell could be undone and Sadhbh restored to human form; upon achieving this, she and Fionn were married and she became pregnant. Unfortunately, Fear Doirich learned of this and transformed her back into a deer after Fionn left for a war; she was thus never seen again.
