= Daolghas =

Irish mythological figure

In Irish mythology, Daolghas was a member of the Fianna mentioned in a late medieval tale who impregnated his daughter supernaturally via a death-bed kiss.

== Story ==
The Irish hero Fionn mac Cumhail's story was told in the Feis Tighe Chonáin [English: The Feast at Conán's House]. In the story, Fionn and his warrior band were hunting but he and Diorraing were separated at nightfall. They were given hospitality for the night in the fairy fort of Conán. Fionn asks to marry Conán's daughter but before his wish was granted, he was presented with the riddle: What man was the son of his own daughter? Fionn named a man called Daolghas and explained that as Daolghas lay dying, his daughter stooped to kiss him. As she did, a spark of fire flew from his mouth to hers, impregnating her. When the child was born, he was named after her father and eventually became one of the Fianna with Fionn. With this answer, Fionn was then permitted to marry Conán's daughter.
