= Muirne =

Muirne or Muireann Muncháem ("Muireann of the beautiful neck") was the sister of Uirne and the mother of Fionn mac Cumhail in the Fenian Cycle of Irish mythology.

She had many suitors, but her father, the druid Tadg mac Nuadat, had foreseen that her marriage would lead to the loss of his home on the hill of Almu, so he refused them all. But one of them, Cumhal, leader of the fianna, abducted her. Tadg appealed to the High King, Conn of the Hundred Battles, who outlawed and pursued Cumhal.

Cumhal was killed in the Battle of Cnucha, but Muirne was already pregnant, so her father rejected her and told his followers to burn her. Conn prevented this, and sent Muirne into the protection of Fiacal mac Conchinn and his wife, the druidess Bodhmall, who was Cumhal's sister. She gave birth to a son, whom she called Deimne, but who later became known as Fionn.

Muirne left the boy in the care of Bodhmall and a warrior woman called Liath Luachra, who brought him up in secret in the forest. She went on to marry a local king, Gleor Lámderg, and saw her son again only once, six years later, when she came to visit him in the forest.

== See also ==
- Muirenn
