= Muireann Ní Bhrolcháin =

Irish academic and activist

Dr Muireann Ní Bhrolcháin (15 May 1955 – 14 April 2015) was an Irish academic and activist. She was a historian of Early Irish literature, history, and genealogy, with particular interest in Irish women.

== Early life ==
Muireann Ní Bhrolcháin grew up in an Irish-speaking household in Salthill, Galway City. Her father, Cilian Ó Brolcháin (1905-1976), was professor of physics at UCG (now University of Galway), and her mother Mairéad (Coughlan) was a former domestic science teacher from Macroom, County Cork. She had two sisters, Clíona and Deirbhile. Ní Bhrolcháin went to school in Galway, attending the Irish-language primary school Scoil Fhursa, followed by Salerno Secondary School. Raised in a musical family, she carried on her various creative interests throughout her youth.

== Academic work ==
Ní Bhrolcháin attended UCG to study English, philosophy, history and Irish, followed by an MA ancient Irish. She gained her doctorate from the Dublin Institute for Advanced Studies (DIAS) in 1982 with a thesis on the Banshenchas (literally "the woman lore").

At this point she had already begun her decades-long work in teaching, initially as a part-time Irish lecturer at St Patrick's College, Maynooth. In 1983 she was appointed lecturer in the Old and Middle Irish (later the Department of Early Irish) at Maynooth University, becoming Senior Lecturer in 1997. There, she went on to help establish the Maynooth University Centre for Irish Cultural Heritage, which ran courses for students from 2014. Ní Bhrolcháin was chosen to be a member of the university’s Governing Authority from 2010 to 2015.

In 2009 Ní Bhrolcháin published the book Introduction to Early Irish Literature, which drew together much of her research on Old Irish and Middle Irish texts. Her papers were published in many academic journals over her career, including Éigse, Ériu, Léachtaí Cholm Cille, Seanchas Ard Mhacha: journal of the Armagh Diocesan Historical Society and ULIDIA.

== Political activism and community work ==
Ní Bhrolcháin was active in the campaign to try to prevent the construction of a motorway through the area close to Hill of Tara (which eventually opened in 2010), arguing for its preservation as a monument of Irish cultural heritage. In 2005 she coordinated a statement to the government signed by 350 academics.

As a Labour Party activist she was involved in many of its campaigns. She was party’s Irish language spokesperson for both Ireland's divorce referendums in 1986 and 1995. In 1996, at the request of Michael D. Higgins (then Minister for Arts, Culture and the Gaeltacht), she chaired a commission on the role of Irish-language voluntary organisations, whose report eventually contributed to the development of the Official Languages Act 2003.

She was also an active member of Maynooth Community Council for thirty years until her death.

== Fiction writing ==
Ní Bhrolcháin also wrote fiction in Irish, including young adult fiction books An bád sa chuan (1990), Ar ais arís (1991), Eachtraí samhraidh (1992), Dialann Chaoimhe (1994) and An solas sa chaisleán (1994), as well scripts for the TV series Ros na Rún.

== Death ==
She died on April 14th 2015 at St. Francis Hospice Blanchardstown, Dublin, aged 59. Her funeral service was attended by President of Ireland Michael D. Higgins. She was survived by her partner, two daughters and granddaughter.

== Bibliography ==
- "Women in early Irish myths and sagas", Crane Bag (4/1), 1980, pp. 12–19
- "An Banshenchas", Léachtaí Cholm Cille (12), 1982, pp. 5–29
- "Leabhar Laighean", Léachtaí Cholm Cille(13), 1982, pp. 5–40
- "A possible source for Seathrún Céitinn's Foras Feasa ar Éirinn", Éigse (19/1), 1982, pp. 61–81
- "The manuscript tradition of the Banshenchas", Ériu (33), 1982, pp. 109–135
- "Scéal Dheirdre", Léachtaí Cholm Cille (14), 1983, pp. 39–89
- "Maol Íosa Ó Brolcháin: his work and family", Donegal annual (38), 1986, pp. 3–19
- "Maol Íosa Ó Brolcháin: an assessment", Seanchas Ard Mhacha: journal of the Armagh Diocesan Historical Society (12/1), 1986, pp. 43–67
- "Maol Íosa Ó Brolcháin agus a chine", Léachtaí Cholm Cille (16), 1986, pp. 87–109
- Maol Íosa Ó Brolcháin, Maigh Nuad, An Sagart, 1986
- "Re tóin mná: in pursuit of troublesome women", Ulidia (1), 1994, pp. 115–121
- "The Banshenchas revisited", Chattel, servant or citizen: women’s status in church, state and society Papers read before the XXIst Irish Conference of Historians, held at Queen's University of Belfast, 27–30 May 1993, edited by Mary O’Dowd and Sabine Wichert. 1995, pp. 70–81
- "The Tara-Skryne or the Gabhra Valley in early Irish literature", Ríocht na Midhe: records of the Meath Archaeological and Historical Society (17), 2006, pp. 1–15
- "Who was Gormlaith's mother? A detective story", Lost and Found II – Rediscovering Ireland’s past, 2009, pp. 83–94.
- "Serglige Con Culainn: a possible re-interpretation", Ulidia (2), 2009, pp. 344–355
- An introduction to early Irish literature, Dublin: Four Courts, 2009
- "Death-tales of the early kings of Tara", Landscapes of cult and kingship, 2011, pp. 44–65.
- "The Banshenchas: genealogy and women of the Ulster Cycle", Ulidia (3), 2013, pp. 75–85
- "Irish Jezebels: women talking. Gendered discourse in early Irish literature", Saltair saíochta, 2013, pp. 199–210

== See also ==
- Gormflaith ingen Murchada
- Book of Leinster
