= Heinrich Zimmer (Celticist) =

Heinrich Friedrich Zimmer (11 December 1851 – 29 July 1910) was a German Celticist and Indologist.

Born to a farming family in Kastellaun in the Rhineland-Palatinate in western Germany, he studied ancient languages at Kaiser Wilhelm University in Strassburg, going on to study Indology and Sanskrit under Rudolf von Roth at the University of Tübingen. In 1878 he became a lecturer at Friedrich Wilhelm University in Berlin, where the young Ferdinand de Saussure studied with him; in 1881 he became Professor of Sanskrit and Comparative Linguistics at the University of Greifswald. In 1901 he became the founding Professor of Celtic at Friedrich Wilhelm University, the first position of its kind in Germany; his most celebrated student there was Rudolf Thurneysen. (He was followed in the post after his death by Kuno Meyer.) In 1902 he became a member of the Prussian Academy of Sciences and in 1906 a corresponding member of the Bavarian Academy of Sciences and Humanities. In 1910, suffering from an incurable illness, he committed suicide by drowning himself.

== Writings ==
- Die nominalsuffixe a and â in den germanischen Sprachen (Strassburg: K. J. Trübner, 1876)
- Keltische Studien (Berlin: Weidmann, 1881)
- Ueber die Bedeutung des irischen Elements für die mittelalterliche Kultur (Preussische Jahrbücher, 1887; translated by Jane Loring Edmands as The Irish Element in Mediaeval Culture, New York: Putnam, 1891)
- Nennius Vindicatus
