= Oisín =

Character in Celtic mythology

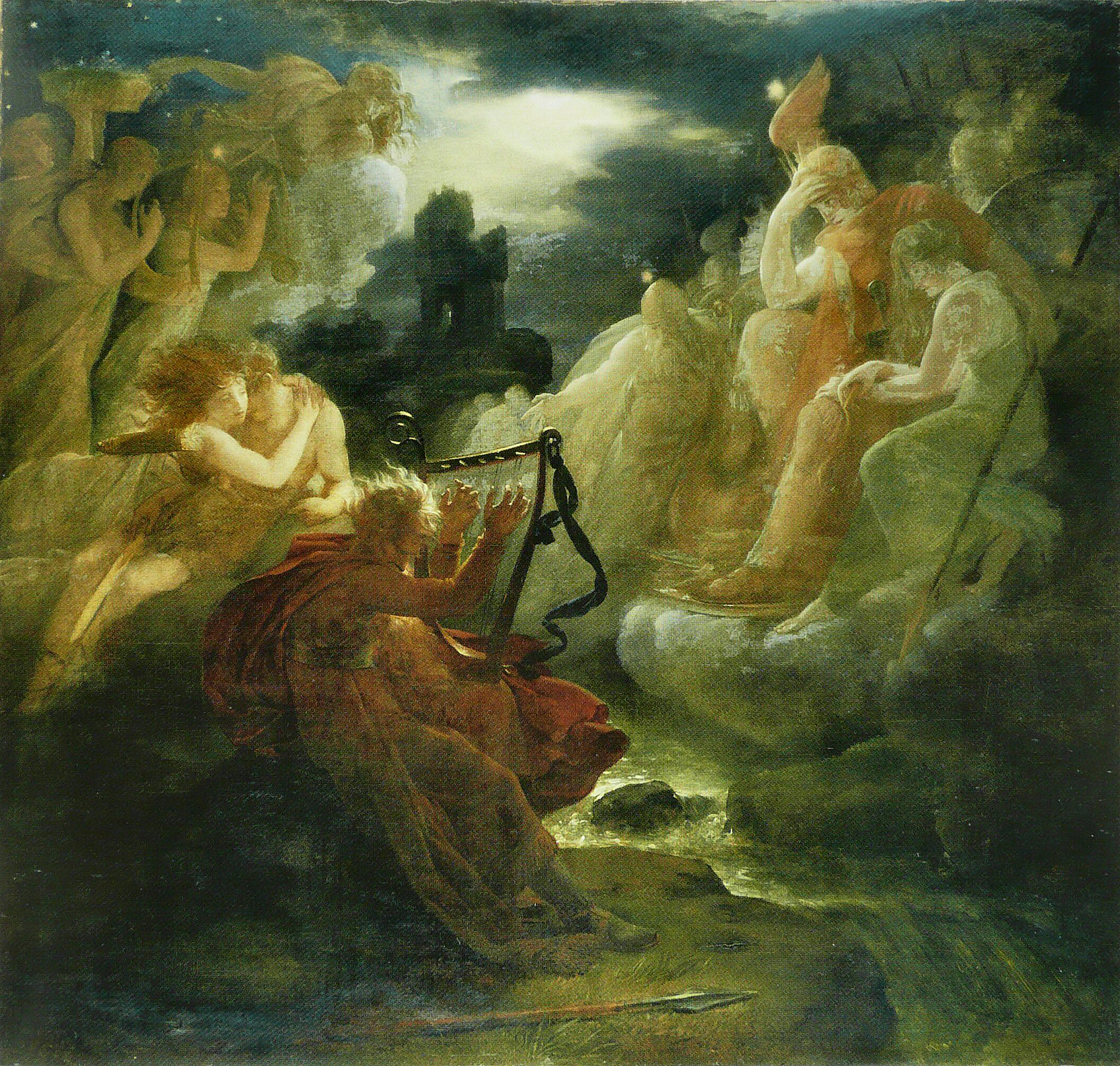
Ossian playing his harp, by François Pascal Simon Gérard, 1801

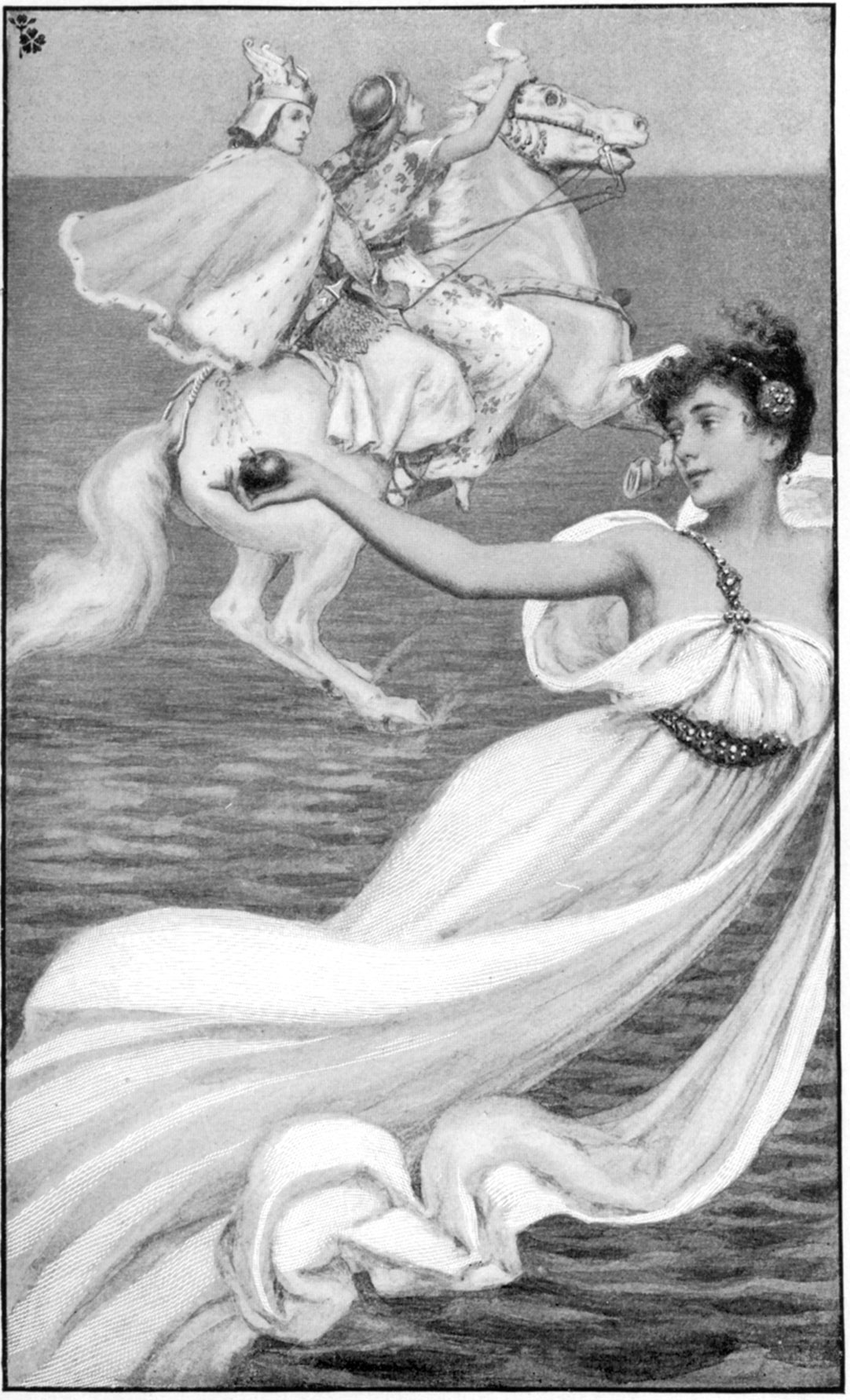
Oisín and Niamh on their way to Tír na nÓg, illustration by Albert Herter, 1899

Oisín (Irish pronunciation: [ˈɔʃiːnʲ, ɔˈʃiːnʲ]), Osian, Ossian (/ˈɒʃən/ OSH-ən), or anglicized as Osheen was regarded in legend as the greatest poet of Ireland, a warrior of the Fianna in the Ossianic or Fenian Cycle of Irish mythology. He is the demigod son of Fionn mac Cumhaill and of Sadhbh (daughter of Bodb Dearg), and is the narrator of much of the cycle and composition of the poems that are attributed to him.

== Legends ==
His name literally means "young deer" or fawn, and the story is told that his mother, Sadhbh, was turned into a deer by a druid, Fear Doirche (or Fer Doirich). A young hunter named Fionn caught Sadhbh, but did not kill her, and she returned to human form. Fionn gave up hunting and fighting to settle down with Sadhbh, and she was soon pregnant, but Fer Doirich turned her back into a deer and she returned to the wild. Seven years later Fionn found his child, naked, on Benbulbin. Other stories have Oisín meet Fionn for the first time as an adult and contend over a roasting pig before they recognise each other.

In Oisín in Tir na nÓg, his most famous echtra or adventure tale, he is visited by a fairy woman called Niamh Chinn Óir (Niamh of the Golden Hair or Head, one of the daughters of Manannán mac Lir, a god of the sea). Niamh's father turned her head into a pig's head because of a prophecy. She tells this to Oisín and informs him she would return to her original form if he marries her. He agrees and they return to Tir na nÓg ("the land of the young", also referred to as Tir Tairngire, "the land of promise") where Oisín becomes king. Their union produces Oisín's famous son, Oscar, and a daughter, Plor na mBan ("Flower of Women"), as well as a second son, Finn. After what seems to him to be three years but in fact, was 300 years, Oisín decides to return to Ireland to see his old comrades the Fianna. One tale describes him coming to Ballinskelligs Bay, not far from Ballaghisheen, where he fell off his horse while trying to help move a large stone. Niamh had given him her white horse Embarr and warned him not to dismount because if his feet touched the ground, those 300 years would catch up with him and he would become old and withered. Another legend has Oisín returning to the hill of Almu, Fionn's home, abandoned and in disrepair. Later, while trying to help some men who were building a road in Gleann na Smól lift a stone out of the way onto a wagon, his girth breaks and he falls to the ground, becoming an old man just as Niamh had forewarned. The horse returns to Tir na nÓg. In some versions of the story, just before he dies Oisín is visited by Saint Patrick. Oisín tells Saint Patrick the stories of the Fianna and shortly after he dies.

The interaction between St. Patrick and Oisín has also been said to be more complicated. It is said that they were both angered by their differences. St. Patrick attempted to convert Oisín, but Oisín hated St. Patrick's teachings. One of the stories of the two involves Oisín fighting a bull for St. Patrick. Oisín kills the bull and when St. Patrick comes to see how the results of the fight, Oisín is asleep in the bull's hide. In return for killing the bull, Oisín asks to be buried facing the east on Slieve Gullion, Co. Armagh. It is said that he was buried in the bull's hide on Curran Mountain near Manorhamiltion.

In the tale Acallam na Senórach (Tales of the Elders), Oisín and his comrade Caílte mac Rónáin survived to the time of Saint Patrick and told the saint the stories of the Fianna. This is the source of William Butler Yeats's poem The Wanderings of Oisin. In different versions of the story Oisín either defends the Druid faith or converts to Christianity.

The location of the grave site of Oisín is disputed. It is rumoured to be in Glenalmond in Perth, Scotland. Wordsworth wrote a poem on the subject entitled "Glen-Almain, the Narrow Glen". Others say it is located in the Nine Glens of Antrim at a site that has been known for generations as "Oisín's Grave". The megalithic court cairn is located on a hillside in Lubitavish, near the Glenann River, outside the village of Cushendall on the North Antrim Coast, and is believed to be the ancient burial place of Oísín.

== Macpherson's Ossian ==
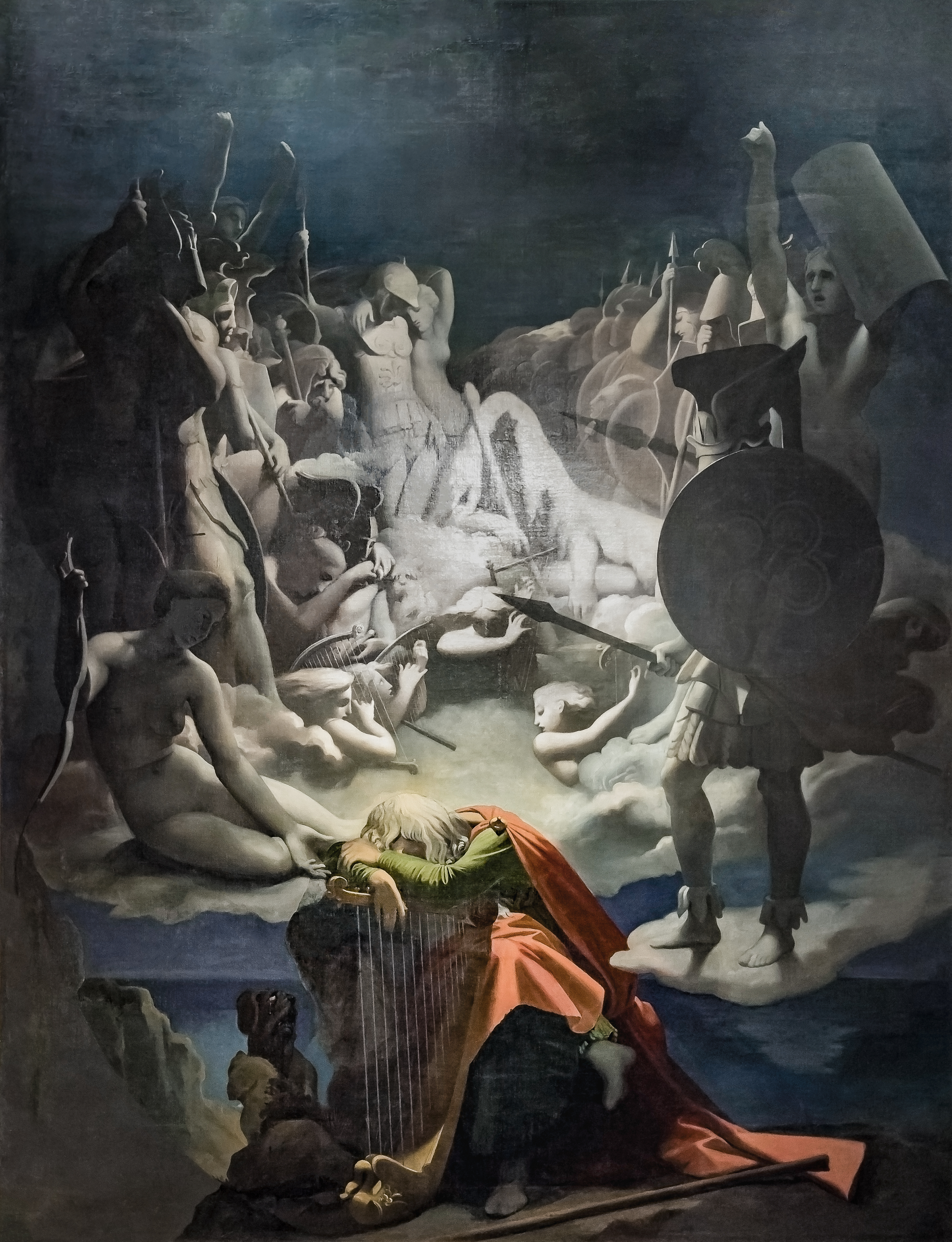
The Dream of Ossian, Jean Auguste Dominique Ingres, 1813

Ossian, the narrator and purported author of a series of poems published by James Macpherson in the 1760s, is based on Oisín. Macpherson claimed to have translated his poems from ancient sources in the Scottish Gaelic language. Macpherson's poems had widespread influence on many writers including Goethe and the young Walter Scott, although their authenticity was widely disputed. Modern scholars have demonstrated that Macpherson based his poems on authentic Gaelic ballads, but had adapted them to contemporary sensibilities by altering the original characters and ideas and introducing a great deal of his own.

== Cultural references ==
- Oisín is a minor character in The Pursuit of Diarmuid and Gráinne from the Fenian cycle of stories.
- The poem "Ogum i llia lia uas lecht" in the Book of Leinster is ascribed to Oisín.
- Oisín, along with St. Patrick, is the main character of William Butler Yeats's epic poem The Wanderings of Oisin. He is also mentioned in Yeats's poem The Circus Animals' Desertion.
- Tír na nÓg is the name given to a large white horse in the Mike Newell film Into the West. In the story, Grandfather Reilly is followed to Dublin by this white horse and gives it to his grandsons, Ossie (Oisín) and Tito. Grandfather tells them the horse is called "Tír na nÓg" and relates a version of the story of Oisín going to Tír na nÓg, the mythical Otherworld. As the family are Irish Travellers, Oisín is referred to in the grandfather's account as "the most handsome traveller who ever lived" rather than as the Fenian character of legend.
- In Shadowmagic, a novel and podiobook by John Lenahan, Oisín is the king of Tír na nÓg and the father of Connor, the lead character.
- Oisin is a mentor of the main character that appears in the "David Sullivan series" of modern fantasy novels written by Tom Deitz.
- Oisin appears in Italian comic books fighting alongside Zagor.
- The 1981 animated short film Faeries, directed by Lee Mishkin with animation direction by Fred Hellmich, is a retelling of the Oisin myth, incorporating elements from the 1978 book Faeries, described and illustrated by Brian Froud and Alan Lee.
- The song "Pearl" by Sounds From the Ground contains vocals of an Irish girl recounting the old Irish myth of Oisin.
- The Japanese tactical role-playing game Fire Emblem: Thracia 776 has a character named Osian who serves under a troupe called the Fiana Freeblades.
- The short story "Patrick of the Bells" by Irish-American author Herminie Templeton Kavanagh features a retelling of the legendary meeting of Oisín (here spelt "Ossian" as in Macpherson's writings) and St. Patrick, first published in McClure's magazine's December 1907 issue and later included in her 1926 collection of stories The Ashes of Old Wishes and Other Darby O'Gill Tales. Here, after a series of unsuccessful attempts to convert Ossian, who is still devoted to the long-dead Fianna even after being told they aren't in Heaven, St. Patrick turns to prayer and learns that Heaven was conquered by Ossian's undying loyalty for his comrades. As a result, the souls of the Fianna are brought back temporarily so St. Patrick can baptize them and save them from damnation, and this finally converts Ossian, who passes away just in time for his soul to be baptized as well and is thereafter buried by St. Patrick.

== Use in genetics ==
- In Blood of the Isles, Bryan Sykes gives the populations associated with Y-DNA Haplogroup R1b the name "Oisín" for a clan patriarch, much as he did for mitochondrial haplogroups in his work The Seven Daughters of Eve.

== See also ==
- Lànkēshān
- Rip Van Winkle
- Urashima Tarō
