= Aillen =

Fire-breathing entity in Irish mythology

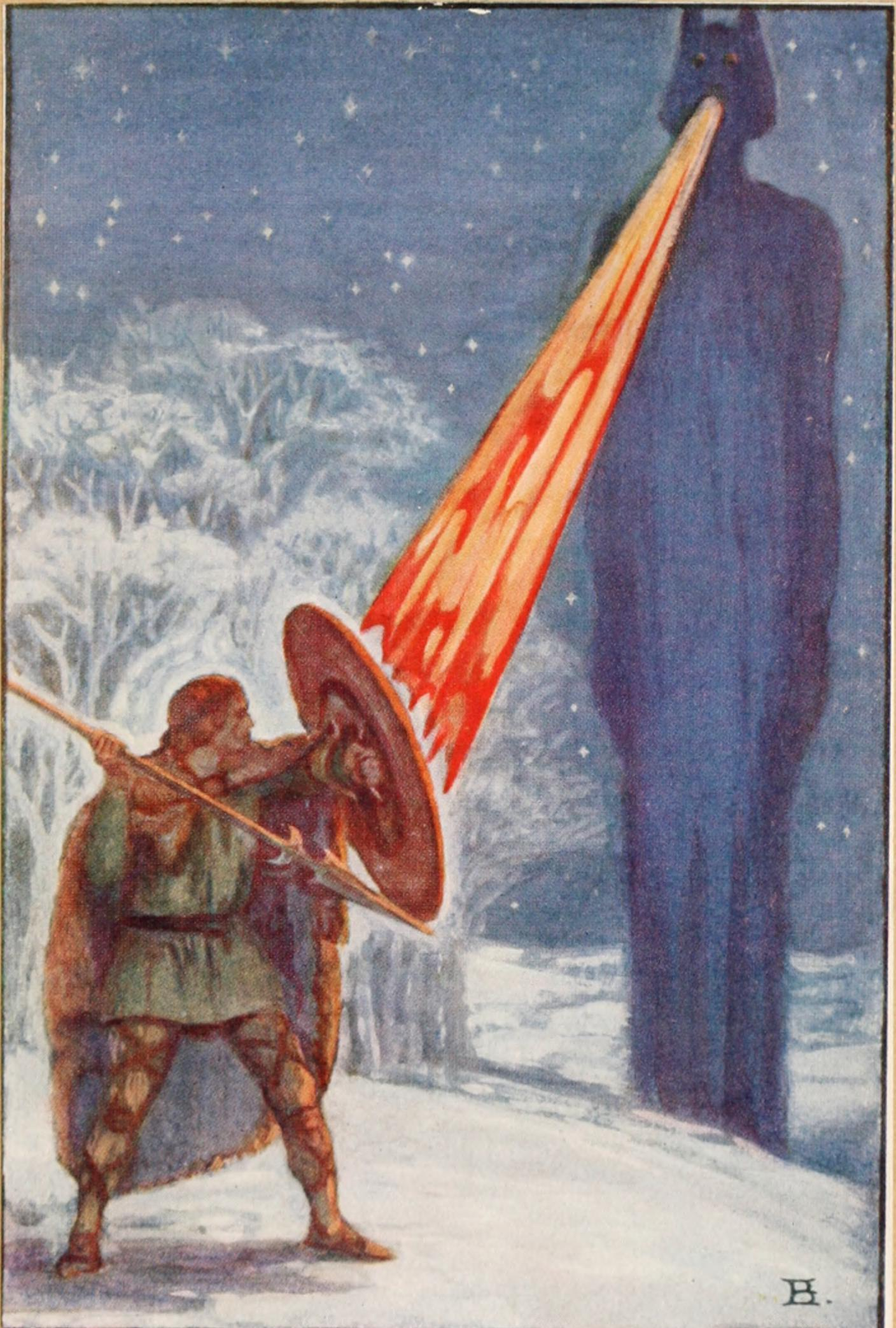
- Fionn mac Cumhaill fighting Aillen, illustration by Beatrice Elvery in Violet Russell's Heroes of the Dawn (1914)

Creature information
- Grouping: Fairie
- Sub grouping: Tuatha Dé Danann

Origin
- Known for: Repeatedly destroying Tara, being slain by Fionn mac Cumhaill
- Country: Ireland

Aillen or Áillen is an incendiary being in Irish mythology. He played the harp or timpán and would lull his victims into a deep sleep with his music.

== Character ==
Called "the burner", According to the most frequently repeated story, Aillén harasses Cormac's court at Tara every November 1 at Samhain. He was said to be part of the Tuatha Dé Danann tribe.

== Deeds ==
According to The Boyhood Deeds of Fionn, he would burn Tara to the ground with his fiery breath after lulling all the inhabitants to sleep with his music every year for twenty-three years straight at Samhain. Afterwards Aillen would return to his fairy mound at Finnachaid, and Tara would be rebuilt.

He would be killed by Fionn mac Cumhaill, who inhaled the noxious poison from his spear to keep himself awake and slew Aillen. The act won him the leadership of the Fianna.

== Names ==
There were several other Irish mythical figures named Aillen. These included Aillén Trechenn, known as "Triple-Headed Aillén". There is also Aillén, the brother of Áine, who fell in love with Fand, wife of the sea god Manannán mac Lir.
