= Cumhall =

Figure in Irish mythology

Cumhall (Irish pronunciation: [kuːl̪ˠ]; Old Irish: Cumall) or Cumhall mac Trénmhoir ("son of Trénmór/Tréanmór" meaning "strong-great") is a figure in the Fenian Cycle of Irish mythology, a leader of the fianna and the father of Fionn mac Cumhaill.

== Genealogy ==
The most important text regarding the family of Finn (son of Cumaill) is Fotha Catha Chnucha ("The Cause of the Battle of Cnucha"), as it is contained in the ancient parchment Lebor na hUidre (LU), dated to the 12th century. Otherwise, the next most important tract is the Macgnímartha Finn ("The Boyhood Deeds of Fionn") copied in a 15th-century manuscript.

According to the Fotha Catha Chnucha, Cumhall mac Trénmhoir (Note: cummal mac trenmóir LU) was son of a petty king, and served the High King Conn Cet-Chathach "of the Hundred Battles". Cumhall was also Conn's half-uncle, his mother being the mother of Conn's father,. (Note: King Fedelmid rechtaid LU being Conn's father.)

Cumhall became suitor for the hand of Muirne Muncaim "of the fair neck", (Note: or Muirne Muincháem "of the Lovely Neck"; Cf. Windisch.) daughter of the druid Tadg mac Nuadat, but Tadg refused him, so Cumhall forcibly carried away Muirne in elopement.

In-laws

In Fotha Catha Chnucha Cumhall's wife was the granddaughter to Nuadat who was a druid to king Cathair Mór, but she was granddaughter to Núadu of the Tuatha Dé Danann according to a passage in the Acallamh na Senorach. Also where the former work gives Almu daughter of Becan as Nuadat's wife, the latter treats Almha the daughter of Brecan as a virgin daughter who bore Cumall a son then died in childbirth. (Note: Note that the name is corrupted to "Cumall son of Tredhorn son of Cairbre" in the one passage of Acallmh na Sénorach, but is "Cumall son of Trénmór" in the other.)

Siblings

Cumhall had a brother, Crimmal mac Trénmhoir, who was an ally of Fionn.

== Battle and death ==
Tadg, slighted by Cumall's sweeping away his daughter, appealed to Cumall's lord, Conn of the Hundred Battles, and Conn gave choice of either relinquishing the daughter or suffer banishment. Cumall refused to give up his wife, and Conn made war against Cumhall, and Cumhall was killed by Goll mac Morna in this Battle of Cnucha, located at what is today Castleknock. Goll then took over leadership of the Fianna, as explained in the Magnímartha Finn.

Cumhall's wife Muirne was already pregnant with his son, Fionn, and Muirne's furious father Tadg not only refused to accept her back, but ordered her burnt to death. Cumhall's wife however seeks Conn's protection, and in exile she delivers a child which she names Demni. Demni (Demne) later became Finn.

Cumhall is reputed to be buried within the grounds of Castleknock College, supposedly under a hill upon which an old water tower now stands.
