= Sadhbh =

Figure in Irish mythology

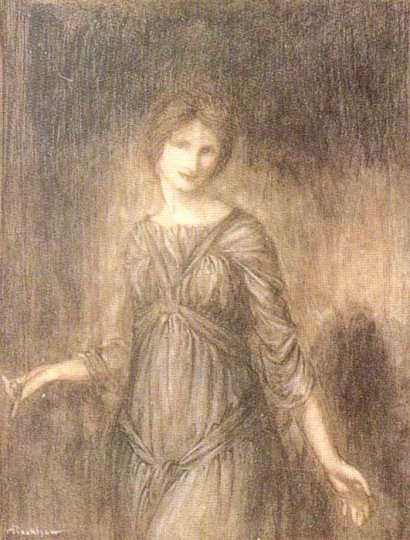
Illustration of Sadhbh by Arthur Rackham, 1910

In Irish mythology, Sadhbh or Sive (/saɪv/ SYVE) was the mother of Oisín by Fionn mac Cumhail. She is a daughter of Bodb Derg, king of the Síd of Munster.

The legend goes that Sadhbh was enchanted to take the form of a doe for refusing the love of Fer Doirich (or Fear Doirche), the dark druid of the Men of Dea (here meaning the Tuatha Dé Danann). She held this form for three years, until a serving man of the Dark Druid took pity on her and told her that if she set foot in the dún (fort or castle) of the Fianna of Ireland, the druid would no longer have any power over her. She then travelled straight to Almhuin (Fionn's house) and was found by Fionn while he was out hunting. Since Sadhbh was a human in animal form, she was not harmed by Fionn's hounds Bran and Sceolan, as they too had been transformed from their original human shape. On their return to Almhuin, Sadhbh became a beautiful girl once more and soon she and Fionn were married. Fionn loved her so much that he gave up hunting and all other pleasures but her, and she quickly became pregnant.

It was while Fionn was in battle against the Vikings that Sadhbh was taken from him. A false image of Fionn and of Bran and Sceolan appeared outside the dún and Sadhbh ran out to her husband, unaware of the danger. As soon as she reached the false image it changed to reveal the Fear Doirche, who took out a wand made of hazel and struck her, thus she became a deer once more.

Fionn spent seven years searching for Sadhbh, but to no avail. At the end of these seven long years, a wild boy was found in the forest while the Fianna hunted. Immediately, Fionn recognised in the boy's face some of Sadhbh's features and realised he was looking at their son. He was named Oisín and over time he became as famous as his father is in Irish mythology.
