= Goll mac Morna =

Figure in Irish Mythology

Goll mac Morna (or Goal mac Morn) was a member of the fianna and an uneasy ally of Fionn mac Cumhail in the Fenian Cycle of Irish mythology. He had killed Fionn's father, Cumhal, and taken over the leadership of the fianna, but when Fionn grew up and proved his worth Goll willingly stepped aside in his favour.

His given name was Áed or Aedh mac Morna. He is also known as Áed mac Fidga. He gained the name Goll ("one-eyed") when he lost an eye in his battle with Cumhal or, in other versions, Luchet, as described below:

"Aed was the name of Dáire's son,
Until Luchet of fame wounded him;
Since the heavy lance wounded him,
Therefore, he has been called Goll."

A different Goll, a Fomorian, was an opponent of Lugaidh Lamhfhada, who knocked out his eye and slew him at Moytura.

As well as that, another variant of the story tells how Goll was chased by Fionn MacCumhaill, leader of the Fianna, to the north coast of Donegal where he was slain on a rock off the coast which known as 'carraig ghoill' (Goll's Rock). This event gave the surrounding Rosguill peninsula its name - Ros Goill refers to 'Goll's peninsula'.

When the witch Irnan failed to capture members of the fianna in a magical web, she turned herself into a monster and challenged any one of the finians to single combat. Initially Fionn mac Cumhaill stepped forward but was persuaded by his warband that it would not be heroic for a warrior of his stature to face a hag in combat. Goll took his place and slew Irnan, and was allowed to marry Fionn's daughter as a reward.

In the tale Cath Gabhra, which describes the battle in which the Fianna fight and are destroyed by the forces of the High King Cairbre Lifechair, Goll and those loyal to him defect to Cairbre's side and fight against Fionn.

"Tapadh le Goll, mharbh e mhàthair" ("Thanks to Goll, he has killed his mother") is a Scottish Gaelic proverb used whenever a nuisance is gotten rid of by the individual responsible for it. For example, Goll killed his mother by mistake with a bone.
