= Fenian Cycle =

Grouping of Irish myths

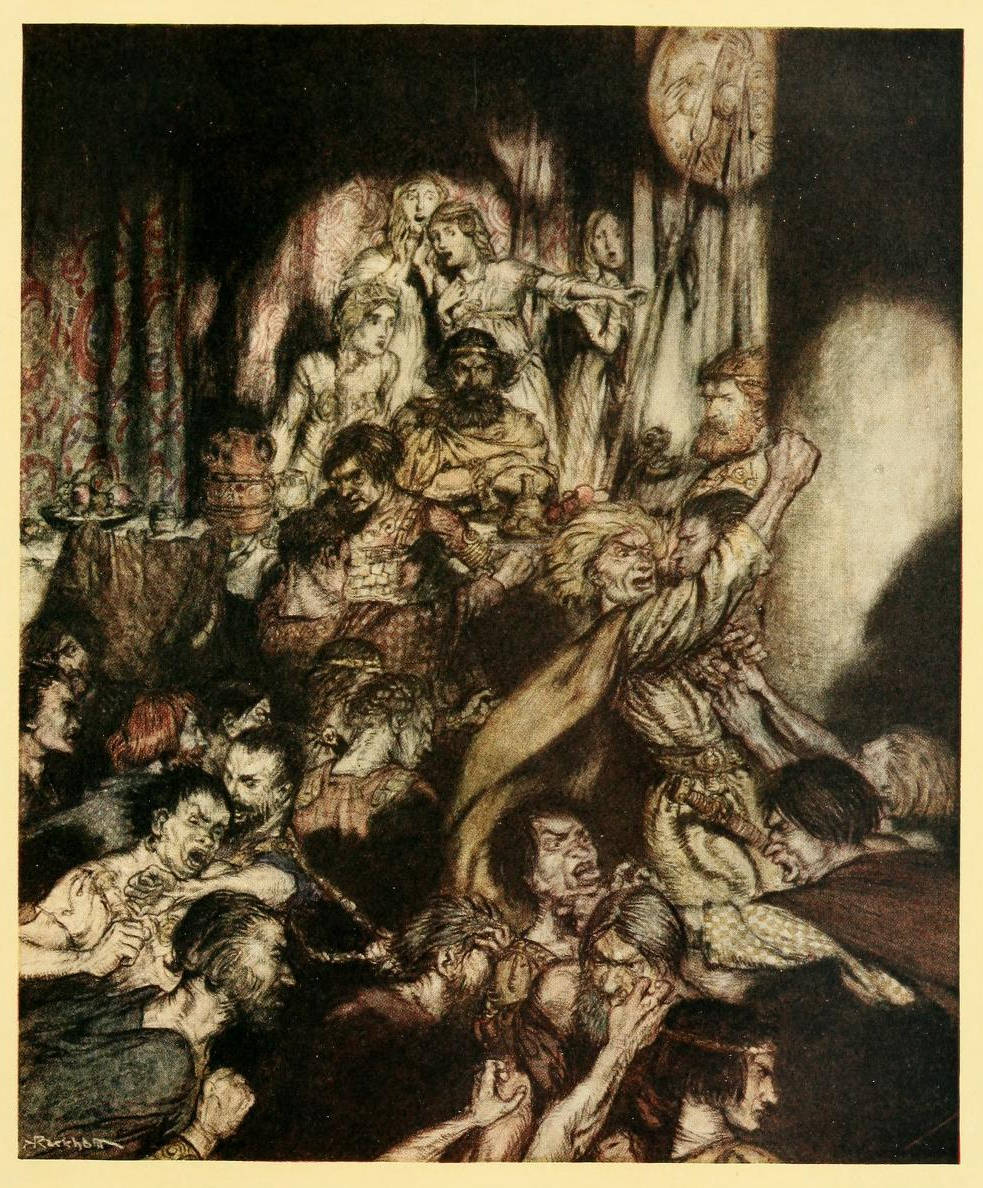
Finn seated in a banquet hall as the Fianna fight with Goll mac Morna's men. Illustration by Arthur Rackham in Irish Fairy Tales (1920).

The Fenian Cycle (/ˈfiːniən/), Fianna Cycle or Finn Cycle (Irish: an Fhiannaíocht) is a body of early Irish literature focusing on the exploits of the mythical hero Finn or Fionn mac Cumhaill and his warrior band the Fianna. Sometimes called the Ossianic Cycle /ˌɒʃiˈænɪk/ after its narrator Oisín, it is one of the four groupings of Irish mythology along with the Mythological Cycle, the Ulster Cycle, and the Kings' Cycles. Timewise, the Fenian cycle is the third, between the Ulster and Kings' cycles. The cycle also contains stories about other famous Fianna members, including Diarmuid, Caílte, Oisín's son Oscar, and Fionn's rival Goll mac Morna.

== List of works ==
In the introduction to his Fianaigecht, Kuno Meyer listed the relevant poems and prose texts between the seventh and fourteenth centuries and further examples can be adduced for later ages:

Seventh century

- Poem attributed to Senchán Torpéist, along with Finn's pedigree, in a genealogical tract of the Cocangab Már 'The Great Compilation' (Rawlinson B 502 and the Book of Leinster).

Late eighth or early ninth century

- "The Quarrel between Finn and Oisin"
- "Finn and the Man in the Tree".
- Reicne Fothaid Canainne

Ninth century

- "How Finn obtained knowledge and the Death of the Fairy Culdub"
- Bruiden Átha Í
- "Find and the jester Lomnae"
- Cormac's Glossary, entry for rincne: Finn as member of Lugaid Mac Con's 'fian,
- "Ailill Aulom, Mac Con and Find ua Báiscne"
- Poem ascribed to Maelmuru Othna in the dindsenchas of Áth Liac Find, where Finn is called 'mac Umaill'.
- Poem ascribed to Flannacán mac Cellaig, king of Bregia, in the Yellow Book of Lecan (125a), on Finn's death on Wednesday.
- Story according to which Mongán was Finn.

Tenth century

- Triads of Ireland: anecdote about Finn and the boar of Druimm Leithe.
- Poem ascribed to Cináed úa Hartacáin on the cemetery of the Brug on the Boyne: on Finns death.
- Two poems on the dindsenchas of Almu.
- Poem on the dindsenchas of Fornocht
- Poem on the dindsenchas of Ráith Chnámrossa
- Poem ascribed to Fergus Fínbél on the dindsenchas of Tipra Sengarmna
- "Finn and Gráinne"
- "Finn and the Phantoms" (prose)
- Poem on Leinstermen and their expeditions against the Leth Cuinn
- Poems on winter and summer
- Poem ascribed to Erard mac Coisse
- Tochmarc Ailbe
- Aithed Gráinne ingine Corbmaic la Díarmait húa mDuibni (lost)
- Úath Beinne Étair
- Úath Dercce Ferna or Echtra Fhind i nDerc Ferna (lost)
- "The Death of Finn" (fragment).

Eleventh century

- Poem by Cúán úa Lothcháin on the dindsenchas of Carn Furbaidi and Slíab Uillenn
- Treatise on Irish metrics, on Finn as one of twelve famous poets.
- Fotha Catha Cnucha (Lebor na hUidre)
- Poem "Finn and the Phantoms"
- Poem on the birth of Oisín (two quatrains in LL)
- Notes on Félire Óengusso
- Text on Irish Ordeals
- Poem by Gilla Coemain, "Annálad anall uile" (first line)
- Annals of Tigernach, AD 283, on Finn's death.

Twelfth century

- Tesmolta Cormaic ui Chuinn ocus Aided Finn meic Chumail
- Boróma
- Prose Dindsenchas
- Poem "They Came a Band of Three" ("Dám Thrír Táncatair Ille") in LL on the hound Failinis from Irúaith.
- Poem on the dindsenchas of Snám Dá Én
- Poem attributed to Finn on the dindsenchas of Róiriu i nHúib Failge
- Macgnímartha Finn, "The Boyhood Deeds of Finn"
- Poem attributed to Oisín
- Poem by Gilla in Chomdéd, "A Rí richid, réidig dam"
- Poem by Gilla Modutu
- Bannsenchas Érenn
- Story of Mac Lesc mac Ladáin and Finn
- Poem attributed to Finn on the dindsenchas of Mag Dá Géise
- Poem ascribed to Oscur on the battle of Gabair Aichle
- Poem attributed to Cáilte, written in the so-called bérla na filed 'the poets' language'.
- Poem attributed to Oisín on the conversion of the fiana
- Poem attributed to Cáilte on the dindsenchas of Tonn Clidna.
- Áirem muintire Finn
- Fianṡruth
- Poem attributed to Finn on the deeds of Goll mac Mornai Glinne Garad.

Thirteenth and fourteenth centuries

- Acallam na Senórach
- "The Chase of Slieve na mBan"

Late Fifteenth and early Sixteenth centuries

- Cath Finntrágha ("The Battle of Ventry")
- "Book of the Dean of Lismore" (Scottish)

Seventeenth century

- Duanaire Finn, book of miscellaneous poems written by Aodh Ó Dochartaigh.
- Tóraigheacht Dhiarmada agus Ghráinne, "The Pursuit of Diarmuid and Grainne"

Eighteenth century

- Collections made in the Scottish Highlands by Alexander Pope, Donald MacNicol, Jerome Stone, James McLagan, and others

Nineteenth century

- Further collections in Scotland and Ireland

Twentieth century

- Tape recordings collected in the Scottish Highlands by Hamish Henderson, John Lorne Campbell and others, of sung performances as well as prose tales.

== Description ==
=== Finn's conception ===
The Finn's father Cumhal is discussed as the leader of the Fianna in Fotha Catha Cnucha ("Cause of the Battle of Cnucha"), his elopement and the conception of Finn mac Cumhal is the cause of the battle, in which Cumhal is killed by Goll mac Morna. This work lays down the theme of the rivalry between Cumhall's Clann Baíscne and Goll's Clann Morna, which will resurface time and again under Finn's chieftainship over the Fianna.

The onomastics surrounding Almu, the stronghold of the Fianna is also discussed here, quoting from the Metrical Dindsenchas on this landmark. (Note: The Fotha Catha Chnucha also quotes from another poem, Goll mac Dare Derg co mblaid.) (Note: Another version of the onomastics of Almu is found in the Acallam, though "rather confusingly given here".) And it is stated that when Finn grew old enough, he received the estate of Almu as compensation (éraic) from his grandfather, who was partly to blame for Cumhal's death.

=== Finn's boyhood deeds ===
Finn's conception and genealogy is also taken up in the Macgnímartha Finn ("Boyhood Deeds of Finn"). (Note: And the Acallam.) (Note: Macgnímartha Finn only survives in MSS no earlier than 15c., but the text on linguistic evaluation has been dated by Meyer to the 12c., like the Catha Fotha Chnucha which is found in the 12c. Lebor na hUidre.)

Tooth of Wisdom

Cumhal's son is named Demne at birth, but bestowed the name "Fionn" after gaining mystical knowledge from eating a salmon. The ability (Thumb of Knowledge, Tooth of Wisdom, dét fis) is manifested by Finn in other works, e. g., the Acallamh, the Ossianic poem about the dog from Iruaidhe, or various lays (duanaire) of the Finn cycle.

Burner of the Síd

Finn's slaying at Halloween (Samhain) of the "supernatural burner" Aodh son of Fidga from the síd occurs in the Macgnímartha Finn, but elaborated in the Acallamh as well, where Aodh manifests himself under a different name, "Aillen". This episode is also told in the poem by Gilla in Chomdéd.

=== Fionn and Aillén ===
Every Samhain, the phantom Aillén mac Midgna, or Aillén the Burner, would terrorise Tara, playing music on his harp that left every warrior helpless. Using a magic spear that rendered him immune to the music, Fionn killed the phantom. As a reward, Fionn was made the leader of the Fianna, replacing Goll, who had to swear fealty to him.

=== Fionn and Sadhbh ===
Fionn was hunting a fawn, but when he caught it, his hounds Bran and Sceólang wouldn't let him kill it, and that night it turned into a beautiful woman, Sadhbh, who had been transformed into a fawn by the druid Fer Doirich. The spell had been broken by the Dun of Allen, Fionn's base, where, as long as she remained within she was protected by the spell. They were married. Some while later, Fionn went out to repulse some invaders and Sadhbh stayed in the Dun. Fer Doirich impersonated Fionn, tempting Sadhbh out of the Dun, whereupon she immediately became a fawn again. Fionn searched for her, but all he found was a boy, whom he named Oisín, who had been raised by a fawn. Oisín became famous as a bard, but Sadhbh was never seen again.

=== Fionn and Diarmuid ===
One of the most famous stories of the cycle. The High King Cormac mac Airt promises the now aging Fionn his daughter Gráinne as his bride, but Gráinne falls instead for a young hero of the Fianna, Diarmuid Ua Duibhne, and the pair runs away together with Fionn in pursuit. The lovers are aided by Diarmuid's foster-father, the god Aengus. Eventually Fionn makes his peace with the couple. Years later, however, Fionn invites Diarmuid on a boar hunt, and Diarmuid is badly gored by their quarry. Water drunk from Fionn's hands has the power of healing, but when Fionn gathers water he deliberately lets it run through his fingers before he gets back to Diarmuid. His grandson Oscar threatens him if he does not bring water for Diarmuid, but when Fionn finally returns it is too late; Diarmuid has died.

=== The Battle of Gabhra ===
Between the birth of Oisin and the Battle of Gabhra is the rest of the cycle, which is very long and becomes too complicated for a short summary. Eventually, the High King Cormac dies and his son Cairbre Lifechair wants to destroy the Fianna because he does not like paying the taxes for protection that the Fianna demanded, so he raises an army with other dissatisfied chiefs and provokes the war by killing Fionn's servant. Goll sides with the king against Clan Bascna at the battle. Some stories say five warriors murdered Fionn at the battle, while others say he died in the battle of the Ford of Brea, killed by Aichlech Mac Dubdrenn or Goll, whom he killed in turn. In any case, only twenty warriors survive the battle, including Oisín and Caílte.
