= History of Dublin to 795 =

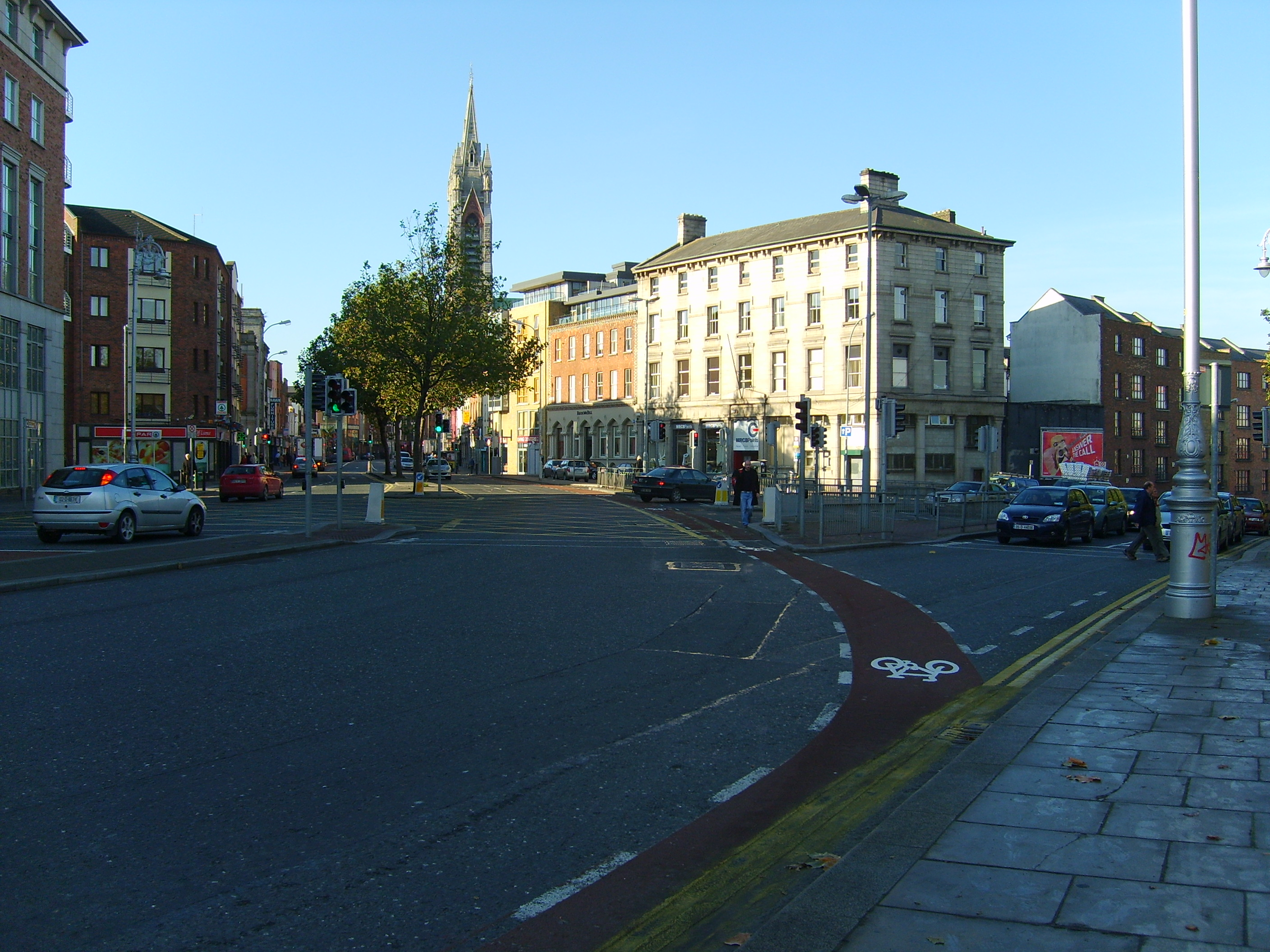
Cornmarket, Dublin: the heart of the earliest settlement

Dublin is Ireland's oldest known settlement. It is also the largest and most populous urban centre in the country, a position it has held continuously since first rising to prominence in the 10th century (with the exception of a brief period in the late 19th and early 20th centuries when it was temporarily eclipsed by Belfast). The historic town grew up on the southern bank of the River Liffey, a few kilometres upstream from the river's outfall into Dublin Bay. The original settlement was situated on a ridge overlooking a shallow ford in the river, which had probably been a regular crossing-point since earliest times. The bedrock underlying the city is calp limestone, a dark shaly sedimentary rock which was once quarried locally and whose mottled grey appearance can still be seen today in some of the city's oldest buildings. Overlying this is a layer of much looser boulder clay of varying thickness.

It is no accident that Dublin became the principal city in Ireland. It is located on the island's only significant coastal plain, which not only forms a natural gateway to the rest of the country but also looks out towards the country's closest and most influential neighbour, Great Britain. Furthermore, Dublin Bay provided early settlers with a substantial and easily defended harbour, protected to some extent by treacherous sandbanks, shallows and mudflats, and overlooked by the twin sentinels of Howth Head and Killiney Hill.

== Early history ==
The first known inhabitants of the Dublin region were hunter-gatherers living during the Later Mesolithic, or Middle Stone Age, around 5500 BC. Shell middens, fish traps and occupation debris, which have been found at a number of locations on and around the shores of Dublin Bay (most notably at Sutton, on Dalkey Island), at the Diageo site at Victoria Quay and at Spencer Dock, which is situated along the northern quays, near the mouth of the River Liffey, indicate that these early settlers lived off the sea.

The first farmers appeared in the Neolithic, or New Stone Age, shortly after 4000 BC. These were the first to erect megalithic monuments and evidence of their culture survives in the burial cairns, passage tombs, portal tombs and wedge tombs that can still be seen in the Dublin Mountains and on the coastal lowlands just to the south of the modern city. Stone axes made of porcellanite from County Antrim or porphyry from Lambay Island have also been discovered at a number of sites in the Dublin region. Pottery too was first manufactured in Ireland during the Neolithic, one of the most noteworthy finds being a funerary bowl which was found in a burial site at Drimnagh, County Dublin.

Around 2400 BC metal working made its first appearance in Ireland. Archaeological excavations in Suffolk Street have uncovered prehistoric copper axe-heads – the copper axe being the principal metal artifact during the earliest phase of Irish metallurgy (the so-called Knocknagur Phase, or Copper Age, which lasted from 2400 to 2200 BC).

The Bronze Age, which in Ireland is dated from 2200 to 600 BC, also left its mark on the Dublin region. A variety of bronze and gold artifacts which have been discovered in the vicinity of the modern city – among them cauldrons, side-blown horns, lock rings, sleeve fasteners, striated rings, hair rings and penannular bracelets – indicate a continuous or intermittent settlement of the area.

In Ireland the commencement of the Iron Age around 600 BC is generally believed to coincide with the first appearance in this country of Celtic-speaking peoples. There is little archaeological evidence to support the theory of a large-scale Celtic invasion (or series of invasions), but it is quite possible that small groups of migrants, highly skilled in the art of war and armed with superior iron weaponry, were powerful enough to gain a foothold in the island and eventually succeeded in subjugating or absorbing the pre-Celtic natives; in the 12th century small bands of heavily armed Anglo-Normans did just this, so there is no conceivable reason why it could not also have happened in the pre-Christian era.

Iron ores are widely distributed throughout Ireland – one of the country's two richest deposits is to be found in County Wicklow, just a few days' walk from the Dublin region – but there is little archaeological evidence for an urban settlement on the site of the modern city during the Early Iron Age (or Athlone phase). Excavations at various locations in the region, however, do indicate intermittent occupation at scattered locations throughout this period (e.g. at Taylor's Grange in Rathfarnham, and at Cherrywood near Loughlinstown).

Once associated with the Iron Age is the ringfort, or ráth, a defensive formation generally consisting of one or more circular earthen embankments surrounded by a ditch. The existence of ringforts in the Dublin region may be deduced from the names of several of the modern city's suburbs: Rathmines, Rathgar, Rathfarnham (on the south side of the city) and Raheny (on the north side). There is also the village of Rathcoole, which lies to the southwest of the modern city. Needless to say the growth of the modern city has all but obliterated these structures, but excavation of ringforts in other parts of the country has sometimes revealed traces of earlier, pre-ringfort occupation of the same sites. In the Dublin hinterland, surviving ringforts are too numerous to mention individually, though a univallate ringfort at Rathmichael (near Shankill to the southeast of the city) may be noted. The lowlying area to the northwest of the city is particularly rich in ringforts. It is now thought, however, that most of Ireland's ringforts date from the Christian era.

== Pre-Viking Dublin ==
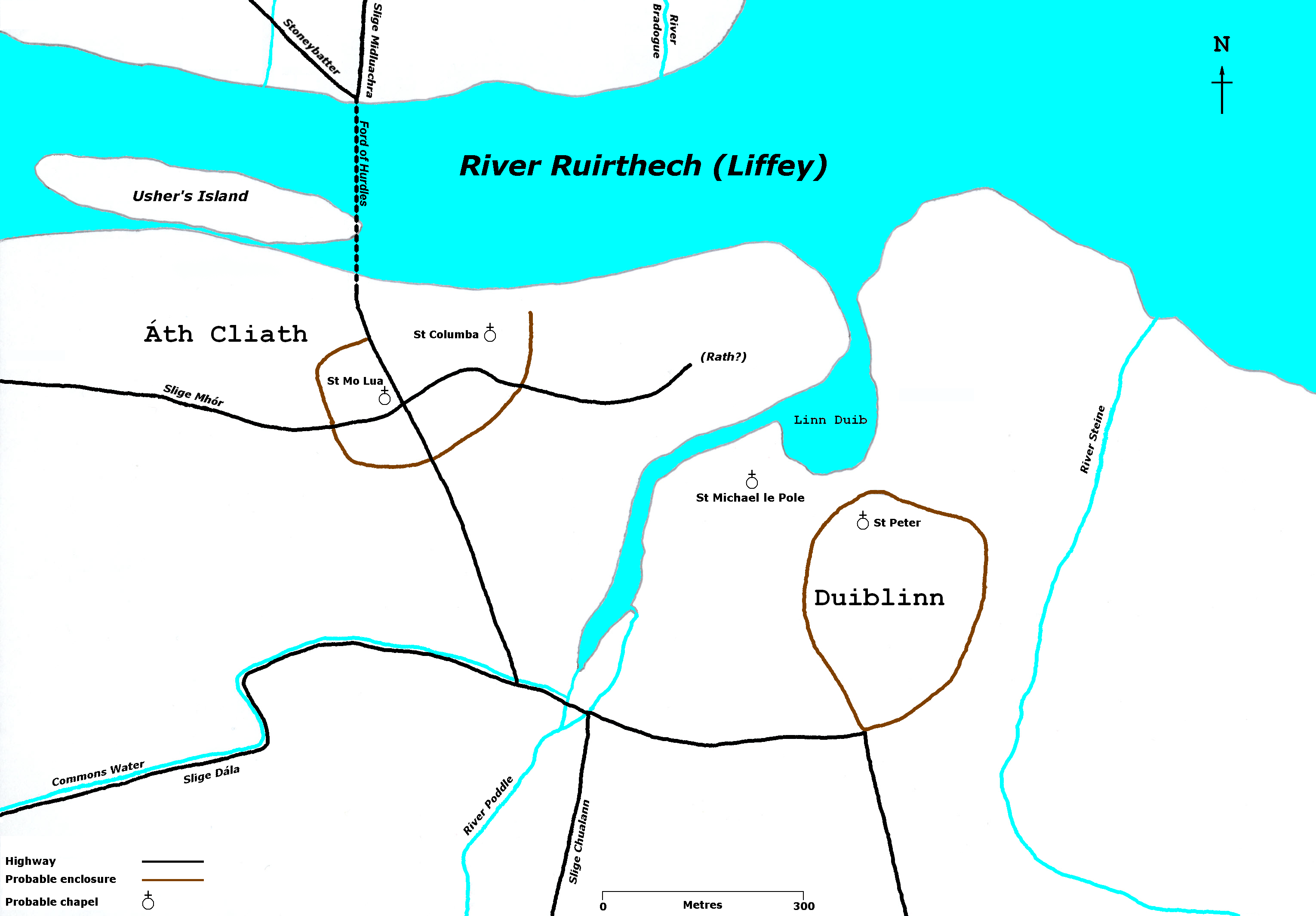
Dublin in the early 9th century

Although the site of the modern city of Dublin has been occupied intermittently since the Mesolithic era, it is not known when the first permanent settlement was established. Ptolemy's description of Ireland, which was compiled around 140 AD but which may draw on much earlier accounts, was once thought to contain a reference to Dublin in Eblana, the name of a settlement on the east coast; this, however, is no longer thought likely and the similarity of the two names is probably coincidental.

Early Dublin is also referred to in a number of native sources. The Book of Invasions, a largely fabulous compilation of myths and legends, mentions Dublin when describing how two legendary kings of Ireland, Conn of the Hundred Battles and Mug Nuadat, divided the country between them. The line of demarcation, which cut the island into two symbolic halves (known as Leth Cuinn, or "Conn's Half", and Leth Moga, or "Mug's Half") ran along the Esker Riada from High Street in Dublin to Galway on the west coast. According to another work which draws on early sources, the Annals of the Four Masters, Fiachu Sraibtine, the king of Tara, quelled the rebellious inhabitants of Leinster in a battle fought at Dublin in 291 AD; the Annals of Dublin also record that Alphin mac Eochaid, King of Dublin, was converted to Christianity by Saint Patrick in 448 AD. But these entries were only added to the Annals', or the sources from which they were compiled, many centuries after the events they purport to record, and no reliance can be placed on them. The simple fact is that we do not know for certain when the city of Dublin was founded.

When contemporary records begin in the 5th century, there is a thriving community of farmers and fishermen in existence in the vicinity of Cornmarket and High Street. A ringed pattern of streets and laneways which can still be discerned in this part of the modern city may be a relic of the original boundary of an early settlement. Located on a prominent ridge overlooking the River Liffey (previously known as the Ruirthech, "running swiftly"), this settlement was easily defended and ideally situated to take advantage of the ford, which lay just 100 metres away.

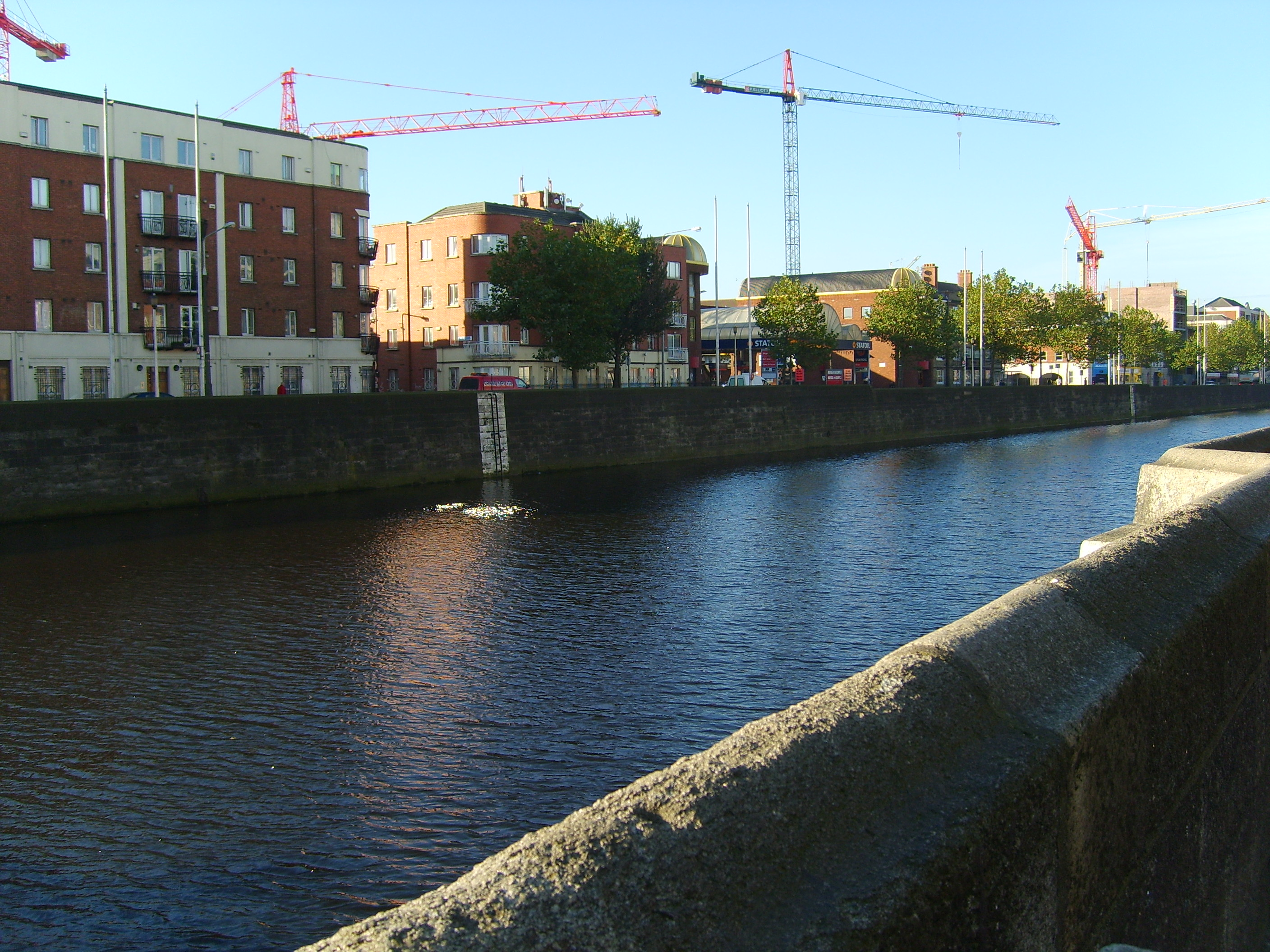
The River Liffey, at the point where the ford of hurdles was located

The name ford of hurdles – Áth Cliath in Irish – suggests that, to facilitate travellers who wished to cross the river dry-shod during low tide, the inhabitants of this settlement constructed a lattice-work of interlaced osiers – hurdles – and secured it to the muddy bed of the river, perhaps making use of the fortuitously placed Usher's Island in the middle of the stream. It is also possible that a series of hurdles used as fish-traps were placed along the banks of the river. The hurdles were probably located about 100 metres west of the point where Father Mathew Bridge now crosses the Liffey, but in the absence of archaeological evidence both its nature and precise location must remain matters of speculation.

In ancient times the lower course of the Liffey is believed to have formed part of the boundary between the provinces, or overkingdoms, of Leinster and Mide (though there is some conflicting evidence which suggests that the boundary was actually marked by another river, the Tolka, which now discharges into Dublin Bay about a kilometre north of the Liffey). Áth Cliath, which belonged to Leinster, must have been an important trading place thanks to its strategic location on this political boundary.

== Early roads ==
It is also hardly a coincidence that four of the five great highways, or slighte of ancient Ireland converged on the site of the medieval city, and not on Tara, as early Irish historians spuriously claimed:

- Slige Midluachra – this road ran southeast from Ulster, and passed through Tara, the seat of the High Kings of Ireland in County Meath. It crossed the Liffey at the ford of hurdles, and came to an end just south of Áth Cliath. Parts of the Slige Midluachra may still be made out in some of Dublin's modern streets: e.g. Bow Street on the north side of the city, and St Augustine Street and Francis Street on the south side.
- Slige Mhór – this was the "great highway" that ran from east to west across the entire country, dividing it into two symbolic halves (Leth Cuinn and Leth Moga). Its eastern terminus lay just beyond Áth Cliath. In the modern city, James's Street and Thomas Street still follow its course.
- Slige Chualann – this road ran south from Áth Cliath. It took its name from Cualu, the district in which Dublin was situated and which lay between the mouths of the Liffey and the Avoca (in County Wicklow). Long stretches of the Slige Chualann survive to this day. In the modern city its early course is followed by New Street, Clanbrassil Street, Harold's Cross Road and Terenure Road North, it then carries on past Rathfarnham Castle, returns to its original mountain tract beyond Marlay Park, today known as The Wicklow Way, a long-distance trail inaugurated in 1980, follows much of the course of Slige Chualann.
- Slige Dála – the fourth great highway was the "highway of the assemblies". It approached Áth Cliath from the southwest, following the course of the Commons' Water, a small tributary of the river Poddle, which in turn is a tributary of the Liffey. Its terminus was at the southern end of the ecclesiastical settlement of Dubhlinn (see below). It survives today in Cork Street, Ardee Street and The Coombe.

These four highways linked Dublin with the five provinces of ancient Ireland: Ulster and Mide to the north, Connacht to the west, Munster to the southwest and Leinster to the south. Although it is not known when these roads were first constructed, a tract dating from around 700 testifies to their early existence. A fifth, unnamed road may have linked Áth Cliath with Tara, County Meath, the seat of the High Kings of Ireland. It is possible that traces of this road are preserved in the modern thoroughfare that runs northwest from Stoneybatter (i.e. the Stoney bóthar, or "cow-track") through Ratoath Road in the general direction of Tara. The existence of this unnamed road suggests that the Slige Midluachra originally by-passed Tara, running north from Dublin to Emain Macha.

Áth Cliath was centred on the crossroads formed by the intersection of the Slige Midluachra and Slige Mhór. After the introduction of Christianity a wayside chapel dedicated to St Mo Lua appears to have been erected at this junction, though the earliest reference to such a church is of a much later date. Another early church, dedicated to St Columba, occupied the site of the present Church of St Audoen, which is thought to be the city's oldest surviving church site. The existence of a market place to the east of the junction is suggested by the modern street name of Cornmarket. The southwestern approaches of Áth Cliath may have been protected by a ditch, which is mentioned in two 13th-century documents.

In addition to the urban settlement at Áth Cliath, the early inhabitants of Dublin may also have constructed a ringfort, or ráth, on the present site of Dublin Castle. This would have been a relatively easy place to defend, being the highest point in the area and surrounded by water on three sides. It could also explain why the eastern terminus of the Slige Mhór lay several hundred metres beyond Áth Cliath. If such a rath did exist, it may have been the source of the placename Druim Cuill-Choille, or "Hazelwood Ridge": according to Harris (1736), this was the city's original name, though no ancient references to such a name are now extant.

The name Baile Átha Cliath itself was first written down in the Annals of Ulster in 1365, some 200 years after the Norman invasion of Ireland in 1169, and the Irish word "baile" (meaning a town), often anglicized as "bally", derives from Norman-French "bailee" or "ville". It remains unproven that it was called Áth Cliath before 795, but for convenience the western of the two settlements is usually referred to by historians and archaeologists as "Áth Cliath" to distinguish it from "Duiblinn" (see below).

The existence of other early ringforts in the vicinity of Áth Cliath may be deduced from the names of several of the modern city's suburbs: Rathmines, Rathgar, Rathfarnham and Raheny, though no firm dates can be assigned to any of these.

== Duiblinn ==
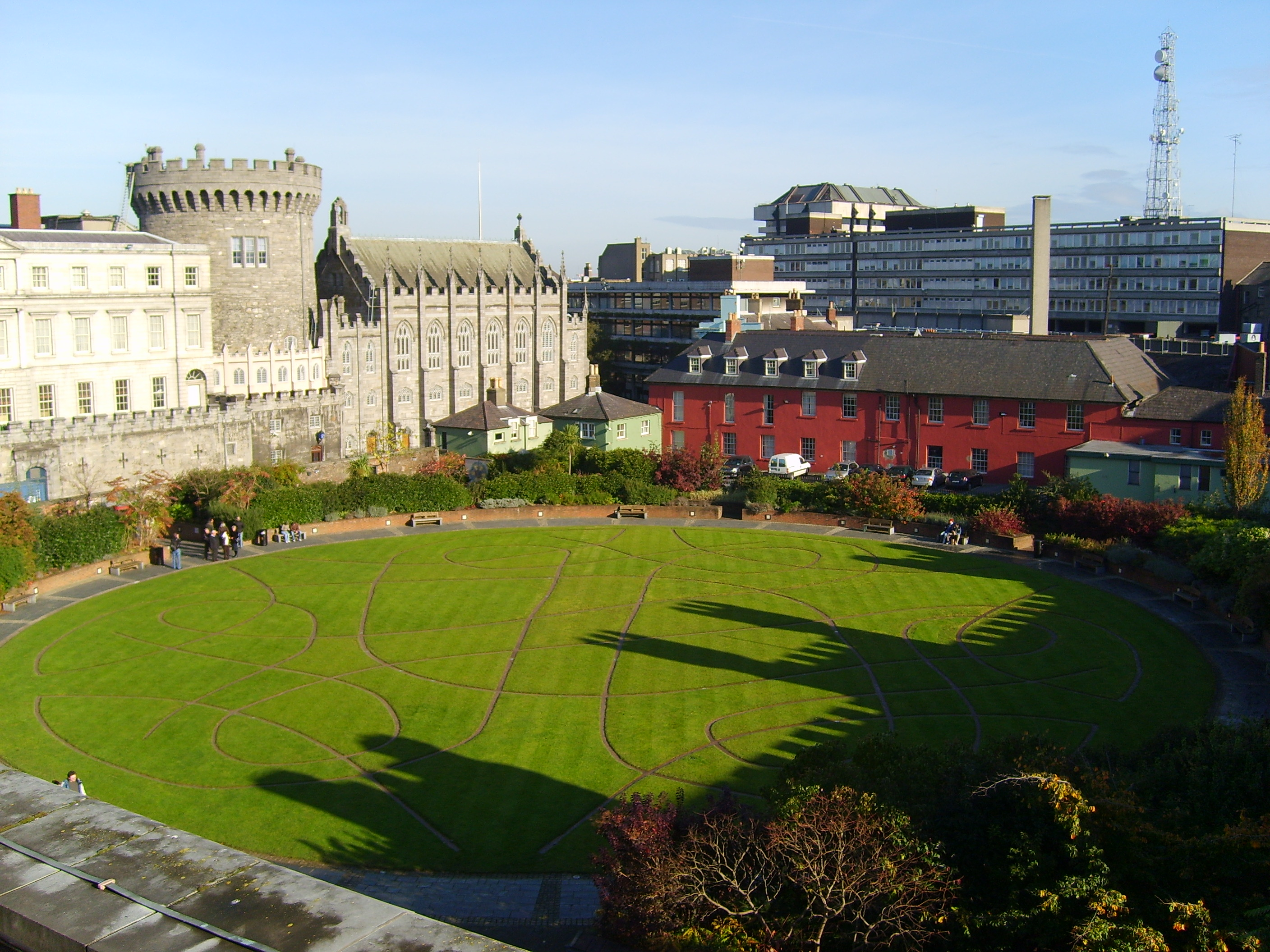
The original site of the black pool from which Dublin takes its name

By the early 7th century Áth Cliath had acquired a neighbour in the form of a large and important ecclesiastical settlement about half a kilometre to the southeast. Referred to in various annals and martyrologies as Duiblinn (Modern Irish Dubhlinn, or "Blackpool"), it took its name from a dark tidal pool in the River Poddle a short distance to the north. (This pool no longer exists, but its location is marked by the site of the Coach House and Castle Gardens at the rear of Dublin Castle.) Covering an area of about 5 hectares, Dubhlinn was one of the largest settlements of its kind in the country, and shared its distinctive pear-shaped outline with hundreds of other ecclesiastical or quasi-ecclesiastical enclosures of the time. This outline can still be discerned in the morphology of the modern city, especially in the oval configuration of St Peter's Row, Whitefriar Street, Stephen Street, and Johnson's Place. In later centuries, this area was served by the local parish church of St Peter's on The Mount, which may have replaced a much earlier church.

However, recent archaeological excavations at the site of another church, St Michael le Pole, between Chancery Lane and Ship Street, have led some historians to surmise that the ecclesiastical settlement of Dubhlinn was located here rather than at St Peter's. As its name suggests, St Michael le Pole – that is, "St Michael of the Pool" – overlooked the "Black Pool" from which Dubhlinn took its name. It lay some 300 metres to the west of St Peter's, outside the latter's pear-shaped enclosure. In common with many other early sites, St Michael's had a round tower, and it is known to have been in existence by the late seventh century.

Graves going back to the 8th century have been unearthed at the site of another early church, St Bride's (or St Bridget's), on the corner of Bride Road and Bride St. This site may have been part of the same ecclesiastical complex as St Michael le Pole's, though the church of St Bride itself seems to belong to a later period.

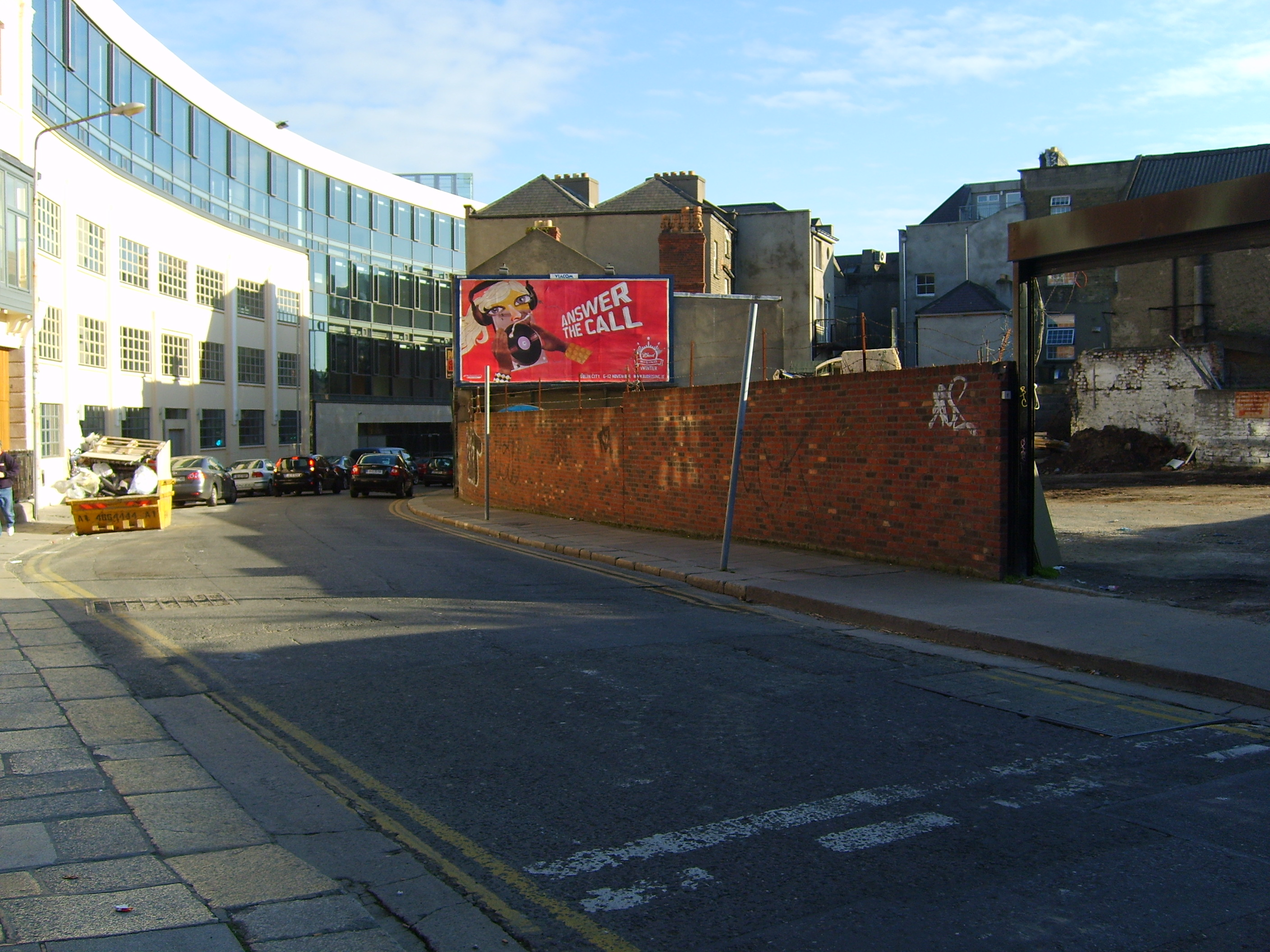
Stephen Street Upper, which follows the course of the northwestern boundary of Duiblinn. The approximate location of St Peter's on The Mount is marked by the white wall near the right-hand edge of the image.

Whatever its precise location, Dubhlinn probably served as the chief place of worship of the Uí Fergusa, a small and politically insignificant sept of the Uí Dúnlainge (an important confederation of Gaelic septs which monopolised the kingship of Leinster from 738 to 1042). A number of early sources refer to Abbots and Bishops of Dubhlinn, with little distinction between the two offices. Among these the following may be noted:

- St Beraidh (†650) – Beraidh's death in 650 is recorded in the Annals of the Four Masters, where he is described as Abbot of Dublin.
- St Livinus (†663) – Livinus, or Lebwin, was the son of a Scottish nobleman and an Irish princess. He was raised in Ireland and studied there and in England. He was ordained by St Augustine of Canterbury. He led a successful mission to Flanders with three companions and became Bishop of Ghent. He was martyred on 12 November 663 by pagans, who tore out his tongue to stop him preaching – according to legend his tongue continued to preach on its own. His martyrdom is depicted in a famous painting by Peter Paul Rubens
- St Disibod (619–700) – Disibod, or Disens, was Livinus's successor; he was allegedly driven from Dublin by violence in 640; he emigrated to the Continent with three disciples; in 653 he moved to the confluence of the Nahe and Glan rivers in Germany, where he founded a community which he led for more than 40 years; a monastery which was later founded on the same site was called Disibodenberg, or Mount Disbod (subsequently Disenberg), in his honour. Disibod's life was written by Hildegard of Bingen in the 12th century.
- St Wiro – Wiro also led a mission to the Continent; he is generally associated with two Northumbrian saints, Plechelm and Otger, with whom he made a pilgrimage to Rome. Around 700 he settled at Roermond in the Netherlands at the request of Pippin of Herstal; his relics are preserved in the local cathedral, which is named after him.
- St Gualafer (fl. 740) – Gualafer is mentioned as Bishop of Dublin in 740; he is said to have baptised and instructed his successor, Rumold, but otherwise nothing is known of him.
- St Rumold (†775) – Rumold, or Rumbold, was an Irish or English monk who is described in some sources as Bishop of Dublin. He made a pilgrimage to Rome; later he preached at Mechelen, Brabant and in Flanders. He was martyred near Mechelen, of which he is the patron saint; St. Rumbolds Cathedral in Mechelen is dedicated to him and contains his relics. He is sometimes said to be the son of a Scottish king.
- St Sedulius (†785) – Sedulius, or Siadhal, was Bishop or Abbot of Dublin. His death in 785 is recorded in the Annals of the Four Masters, where he is described as Abbot of Dublin.
- Cormac (fl. 890) – A certain Cormac is also described by at least one source as Bishop of Dublin in the 9th century. According to D'Alton's Memoirs of the Archbishops of Dublin (1838), he was Bishop in 890 when Gregory (i.e. Giric), King of Scotland, supposedly besieged and captured Dublin – a story that is now regarded as chimerical.

According to Harris (1736), St Sedulius was the last Abbot of Dublin to be mentioned in the Annals. In 795, just ten years after his death, the Vikings, or Norsemen, launched their first raid on Irish soil: a new era in the history of Dublin was about to begin.

== See also ==
- History of Dublin
- Early Scandinavian Dublin

== Notes ==
1. Clarke (2002), p. 1.
2. Clarke (2002), p. 1.
3. Waddell (2000), p. 19.
4. Waddell (2000), pp. 47–48.
5. Waddell (2000), pp. 42–44.
6. Dublin Castle Website
7. Waddell (2000), pp. 229–253.
8. Waddell (2000), pp. 288–290.
9. Database of Irish Excavation Reports: Taylorsgrange Archived 17 July 2011 at the Wayback Machine and Database of Irish Excavation Reports: Cherrywood Archived 17 July 2011 at the Wayback Machine
10. Mitchell & Ryan (2007), p. 256. Ó Cróinín (2005), pp. 238–249.
11. Ptolemy's Geographia. The traditional theory that Eblana is a corruption of a Primitive Irish name for Dublin (e.g. Duiblinn) still has its adherents, but it is contradicted by the complete lack of other Gaelic placenames or tribal names in the Geographia and by the fact that Duiblinn was originally the name of a Christian settlement, and not the nearby town. Furthermore, some early versions of the Geographia give the variant Ebdana, which could be the original form. The true identity of Eblana is still a matter of conjecture. Ptolemy's coordinates would seem to place it in the north of County Dublin in the vicinity of Skerries.
12. The conversion of Alphin mac Eochaid first appears in Jocelin of Furness's Vita Patricii (Life of Saint Patrick), which was written in 1183, though this particular episode may be an even later interpolation, as it contradicts a passage just one page earlier in which Jocelin describes how the saint came to a small village a mile from the ford of hurdles and prophesied that one day it would be a great city – see Harris (1736). The earliest entries in the Annals of Dublin, which are appended to Thom's Official Directory, derive from the work of the 17th century historians Sir James Ware (1594–1666) and his son Robert. Walter Harris, author of The History and Antiquities of the City of Dublin (1766) was a nephew of Sir James.
13. Clarke (2002), p. 2.
14. A slige (slí, pronounced "shlee", in modern Irish) was defined as a road on which two chariots (carpait, or in Latin carpenta) could pass abreast.
15. Harris (1736), pp. 10–11. See also Haliday (1884), pp. 209–210.
16. Ancient records, iii, 56 (1615), where the saint's name is Anglicised as Molloye.
17. The stone church and tower, which survived until 1778, are thought to have been built around 1100, but they were undoubtedly preceded by a much earlier wooden structure – Peter Pearson, The Heart of Dublin (Dublin, 2000); M. Gowen, "Excavations at the church and tower of St Michael le Pole, Dublin", Medieval Dublin II, pp. 13–52 (Dublin, 2001)
18. Annals of the Four Masters; Harris (1736); Ware (1764); D'Alton (1838)
