= Basilica of St Plechelm =

Basilica of St Plechelmus
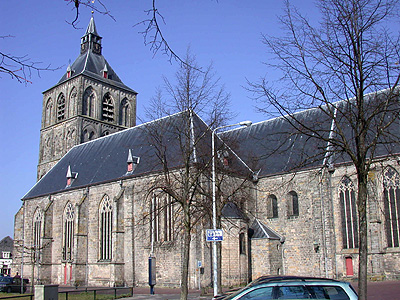
- Basilica of St Plechelmus

Religion
- Affiliation: Catholic
- Province: Overijssel
- Ecclesiastical or organisational status: minor basilica

Location
- Location: Oldenzaal, Netherlands
- Interactive map of Basilica of St Plechelmus
- Coordinates: 52°18′45″N 6°55′42″E

Architecture
- Groundbreaking: 12th century

Website
- http://www.plechelmusbasiliek.nl/

The Basilica of St Plechelmus (Dutch: Sint-Plechelmusbasiliek) is a Catholic church in the Dutch town of Oldenzaal dedicated to the 8th-century Irish monk Plechelm, whose festival on 15 July has been on the calendar of the medieval diocese of Utrecht ever since his canonisation in the 10th century. This festival is still celebrated annually at the basilica, and the saint's 1050th anniversary was celebrated there in 2004.

== History ==
The oldest parts of the existing building date from the middle and the second half of the 12th century, but the history of the church goes back to the 8th century, when the traveling missionary Plechelmus founded the first church on the site, the Silvester Church, initially dedicated to pope Silvester and sometime before 954 rededicated to Plechelmus himself (canonised after the elevation of his relics). In 954, bishop Balderic of Utrecht founded a chapter in Oldenzaal and expanded and restored the 8th-century church, allowing the relics of Plechelmus used on his canonisation to be transferred to it. Since then, the Plechelmus Church of Oldenzaal was held in high regard - for example, during the Middle Ages its chapter was one of only four outside Utrecht that could participate in electing the bishop of Utrecht.

On 13 May 1950 the church was awarded the honorary title of basilica minor by decision of Pope Pius XII.

Coat of arms of the basilica.

By royal decree of 17 March 2009, Queen Beatrix granted the request to grant a coat of arms to the basilica.

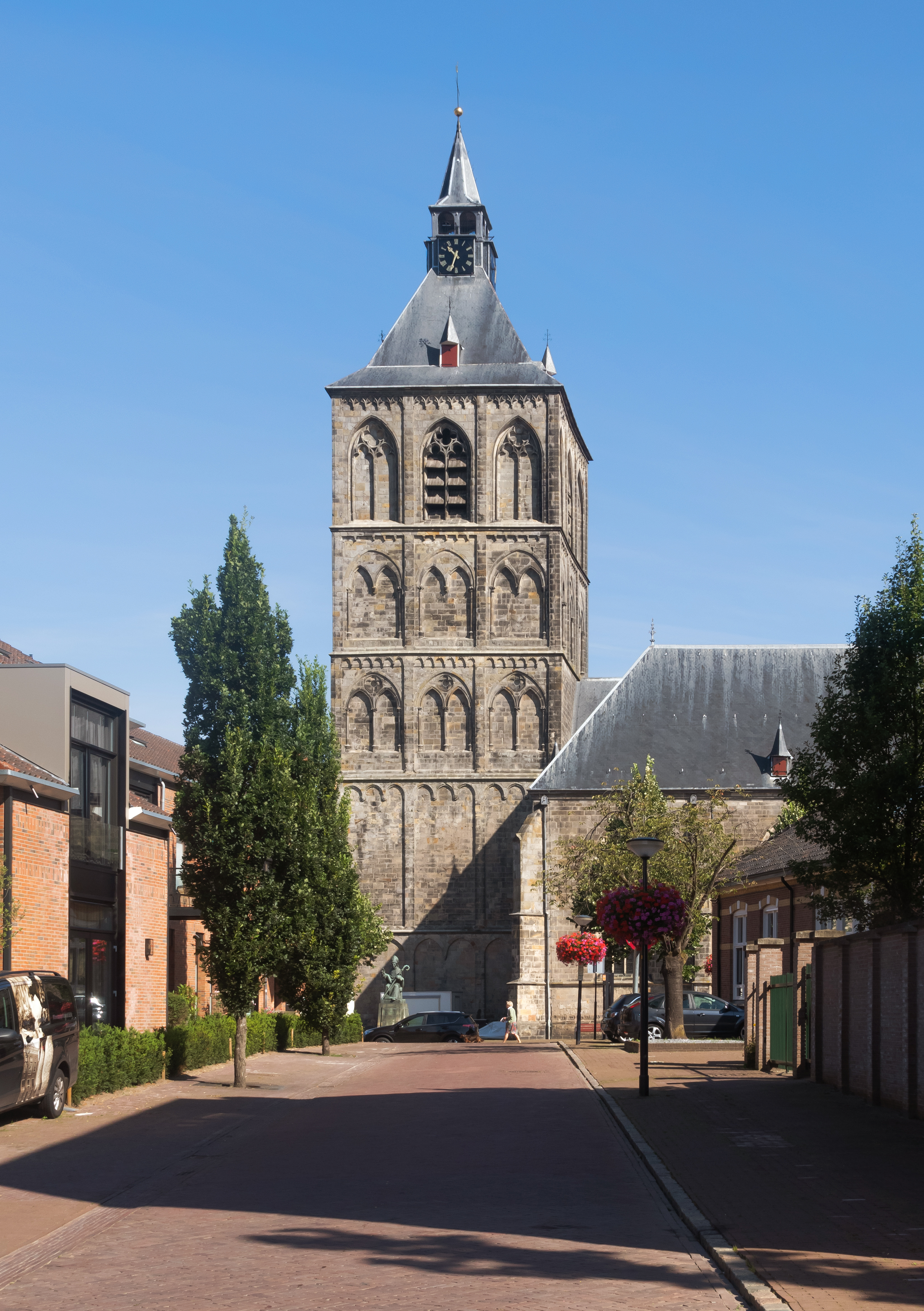
The tower of the basilica.
