= Slíghe Chualann =

Ancient road and route in the east of Ireland

Slíghe Chualann (Irish for 'Highway of Cualu'; modern spelling Slí Chualann) was a road in Early Christian Ireland running south across Áth Cliath ("the Ford of Hurdles"; now Dublin city) entering the territory of Cualu or Cuala before going west of the Wicklow Mountains. The ancient name for Dublin was 'Baile Atha Cliath', the 'Ath' means "ford river crossing", while 'Cliath' means wattled, lattice framed, hurdle. It was one of the five great roads of Ireland; in legend these converged at Tara, inauguration site of the High King of Ireland, but in fact the Slíghe Chualann and three others met at Dublin.

While George Petrie in 1839 suggested that Slíghe Chualann went from Tara to Dublin via an inland route through Ratoath, and then along the coast to Bray, County Wicklow, Petrie's hypothesis is no longer supported. Henry Morris in 1938 argues that the boggy terrain around Ratoath would not have suited chariots and cited sources for a coastal route through Swords, County Dublin as far as the Liffey. Morris goes on to trace the southern route inland, via references in Norman Irish sources to Bóthar Chualann ["Road of Cualu"]. These show the Slíghe Chualann crossed back to the left bank of the Liffey near Oldbawn and ran along the west side of the Wicklow Mountains to Baltinglass and Old Leighlinbridge, then down the River Barrow by Old Ross towards Waterford.

The Wicklow Way, a long-distance trail through County Wicklow inaugurated in 1980, follows much of the same route and has the Irish name Slí Chualann Nua (Irish for 'New Slíghe Chualann'). "Slí Cualann Athletics Club" is an umbrella Athletics Ireland club whose feeder clubs are in north and east Wicklow: Parnell AC (Rathdrum), Greystones & District AC, Bray Runners, Roundwood & District AC, St. Benedicts AC, Glendalough AC and Inbhear Dee AC (Wicklow town).

== See also ==
- History of roads in Ireland
- History of Dublin to 795
