= Rath Meave =

Archaeological site in Ireland

- Ráth Medb (Irish)
- Rath Meabe, Rath Maeve
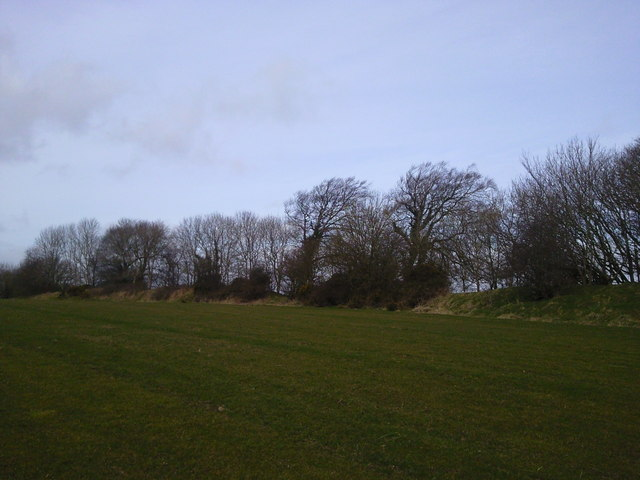
- Edge of the enclosure

- Location within Ireland
- 53.566716°N 6.609074°W
- Type: Embanked enclosure
- Periods: Early Bronze Age
- Cultures: Atlantic Bronze Age
- Location: Odder/Belpere, County Meath, Ireland
- Part of: Hill of Tara complex

History
- Built: 2000–1500 BC

Site notes
- Material: earth
- Area: 3.978 hectares (9.83 acres)
- Diameter: 230 metres (250 yd)
- Circumference: 700 metres (770 yd)

Designations
- Designation: National Monument

Rath Meave is a henge located near the Hill of Tara in County Meath, Ireland. It is a National Monument.

== Location ==
Rath Meave is located in the Tara-Skryne Valley, 1.3 kilometres (0.81 mi) south of the Hill of Tara and 3.4 kilometres (2.1 mi) east of Kilmessan.

== Description ==
The remains of Rath Meave consist of an approximately circular henge, about 700 metres (2,300 ft) long, enclosing an area of about 4 hectares (10 acres).

A cut on the north side of Rath Medb's bank, presumably the entrance, is aligned with the oldest site at Tara, the Mound of the Hostages.

== History ==
Rath Meave dates to the fourth phase of Tara's construction, in the early Bronze Age (c. 2000–1500 BC). This was around the same time as the Mound of the Hostages was used for burials. It takes its name from Medb Lethderg, a Celtic sovereignty goddess who in Irish legend was the wife or lover of nine successive Kings of Tara. Her relationship to the better-known Medb of Cruachan, legendary Queen of Connacht, is unclear; they may be the same character, or one may have inspired the other. The name Medb means "intoxicator" and is cognate with "mead," making clear the connection between the marriage of the king to the sovereignty goddess and the use of alcohol at these ceremonies.
