= Women in a Celtic Church =

Book by Christina Harrington

Women in a Celtic Church: Ireland 450–1150
- First edition cover
- Author: Christina Harrington
- Language: English
- Subject: Women
- Publisher: Oxford University Press
- Publication date: 2002
- Publication place: United Kingdom
- Media type: Print (hardcover and paperback)
- Pages: 329
- ISBN: 978-0198208235

Women in a Celtic Church: Ireland 450–1150 is a historical study of the role of women in the religious institutions of Early Medieval Ireland written by the American academic Christina Harrington, it was first published by Oxford University Press in 2002.

== Synopsis ==
In her "Introduction: The Irish Holy Woman and her Modern Inquisitors", Harrington explores how the religious women of Early Medieval Ireland have been interpreted in the preceding several centuries. She begins by looking at the historiography of Early Medieval nuns, the Early Irish Church, and on Early Irish women, before moving on to an examination of the historiography of non-academic, non-specialist texts designed for a popular audience which have delved into this area. Moving on, she discusses the interpretations of this period that have been produced and advocated by modern Celtic Christians, adherents of the Women's Spirituality movement and Contemporary Paganism. She then discusses the multiple historical errors held to by these latter groups, arguing that the blame for such misinformation must fall upon contemporary academics, who have failed to engage a wider audience.

== Reception and reviews ==
=== Academic reviews ===
Harrington's work was reviewed by Lisa M. Bitel of the University of Southern California in The Catholic Historical Review. Opening with a reference to the woman-hating attitude of Father Jack Hackett in the Irish television series Father Ted, Bitel described Women in a Celtic Church as a "vehemently argued" yet "somewhat naïvely nativist" book. Discussing the tome's contents, she asserts that Harrington produces some "excellent arguments" through her use of first-hand sources but feels that there are problems, particularly in Harrington's "insistence on the unique gender symmetry of Irish society, the unusual power of Irish religious women, and the evil influence of foreign misogyny". She furthermore challenges Harrington on her failure to include references to the arguments posed by several figures working in wider Irish history, namely Julia Smith, Lynda Coon, and Felice Lifshitz.

Joseph Falaky Nagy of the University of California, Los Angeles reviewed the work for Speculum, the journal of the Medieval Academy of America. He was somewhat critical of Harrington's title, believing that the term "Celtic Church" implied that the book would deal not just with Ireland but with the entirety of the Celtic-speaking world. Remarking that those interested in Irish Christianity would find "much of value" in the book, he nevertheless thought that the book contained several "serious problems" in that it "loop[s] back on itself" by repeatedly making use of the same source material and that it reads like an "unkempt dissertation" by referencing entire books rather than the relevant pages within them. He then comments that the most "unsettling" aspect of the book was Harrington's "unfair" attitude towards the work of Lisa Bitel, whom he proclaims to be Harrington's "bête noire."

Women in a Celtic Church was also reviewed by Judith L. Bishop of the Graduate Theological Union in Berkeley, California for Spiritus: A Journal of Christian Spirituality. Holding a positive opinion of the text, Bishop believed that Harrington's book's strength lay in its "in-depth, comprehensive study of the extant primary texts", accompanied by a "thought provoking" introduction. Joseph F. Kelly of John Carroll University published his review of the work in the Church History journal, publication of the American Society of Church History. Erroneously referring to Harrington as "Harrison", Kelly notes that she has performed "a very thorough job" which would be of "great value" to those studying Irish and Celtic Christianity. He nevertheless noted that he had noticed two shortcomings; first, that she includes information from sources that do not advance her case, and second, that she had not focused enough on the "notion of Women" in Early Medieval Ireland.

In The Journal of Ecclesiastical History, Marie Therese Flanagan of Queen's University Belfast proclaimed that the primary problem with the book was its title, which contrasted with Harrington's rejection of the term "Celtic" as useful when dealing with Early Medieval Ireland. Flanagan ended her review by recommending that those interested in Harrington's book read Dianne Hall's Women and the Church in Medieval Ireland, c. 1140–1540 (Dublin 2003). Elva Johnston of University College Dublin published a review in The English Historical Review in which she describes Harrington's title as "misleading" but feels that the author was "thoroughly at home" in dealing with Victorian-era interpretations of Early Medieval Ireland. She is much more critical however of Harrington's discussion of her primary topic, exclaiming that she "does not do nearly enough to locate the experiences of religious women with specificity" and that, as such, readers will turn back to the work of Kathleen Hughes. Claiming that Harrington covers too long a period, she believes that much of the detail was "fuzzy or, in some cases, inaccurate". Although believing that the author provides a good overview of the primary sources, Johnston believes that they have been "imperfectly" analysed.

=== Media reviews ===
David Murphy reviewed Harrington's work in Studies: An Irish Quarterly Review, the publication of the Irish Province of the Society of Jesus. Describing it as a "very interesting book", he commended Harrington's use of first-hand sources. Although generally positive, Murphy criticised the book's structure, believing that it "detracts from its readability". Summarising his review, he highlights the 2003 publication of Dianne Hall's Women and the Church in Medieval Ireland, c. 1140-1540, which chronologically takes off where Harrington's work ends.
