= Plechelm =

Benedictine monk, missionary and saint

Saint Plechelm
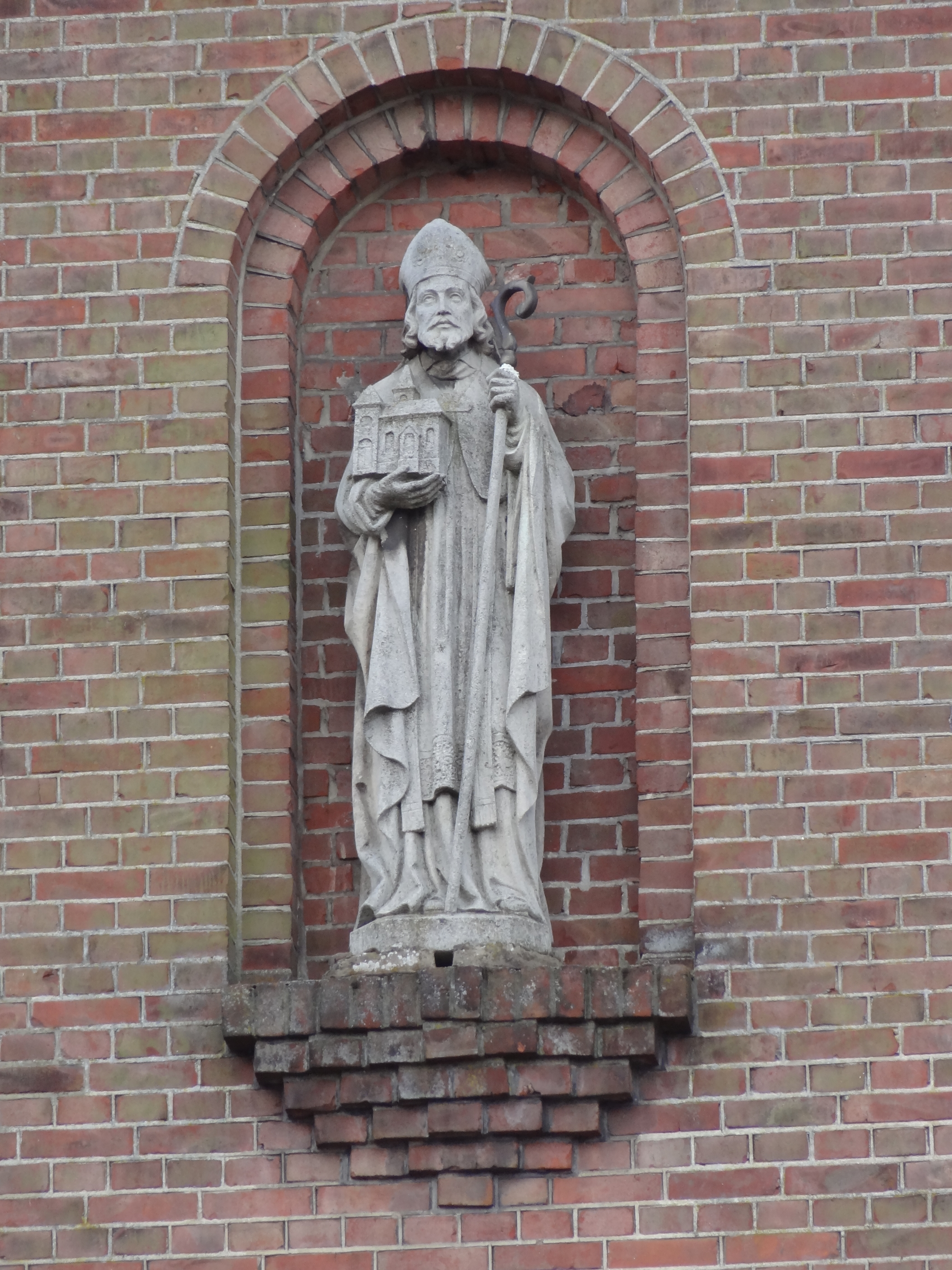
- Statue of Saint Plechelm on the tower of Basilica of St Plechelm in De Lutte

Monk, priest, and missionary
- Born: Scotland/England/Ireland
- Died: 730: Sint Odiliënberg, Kingdom of Frisia
- Venerated in: Catholic Church (Netherlands); Old Catholic Church; Eastern Orthodox Church
- Canonized: Pre-Congregation
- Major shrine: Basilica of St. Plechelm, Oldenzaal, Overijssel, Netherlands
- Feast: July 15
- Patronage: The Netherlands

Plechelm, (Plechelm of Guelderland, Plechelm, also Pleghelm or Plechelmus; died 730), is honoured in both the Catholic Church and the Old Catholic Church as a patron saint of the Netherlands.

== Life ==
According to Alban Butler, Plechelm was an English Saxon born in southern Scotland. Richard Stanton places him in the north of England.

After being ordained, he made a pilgrimage to Rome with two fellow monks, Saints Wiro and Otger. Having been consecrated a bishop, perhaps by Pope Sergius I, he returned home with some holy relics. He then started with Wiro and the deacon Otger on a mission to Gaul. They were well received by Pepin of Herstal, who gave the missionaries St. Peter's Mount (also known as Sint Odiliënberg). They built a monastery there which was important in the Christianization of the Netherlands. Many missions were sent from there to the provinces between the Rhine and the Meuse.

According to John O'Hanlon, it is said that Plechelm and Wiro were present at the Synod of Utrecht in 697. Plechelm died in Sint Odiliënberg at the age of 100 years.

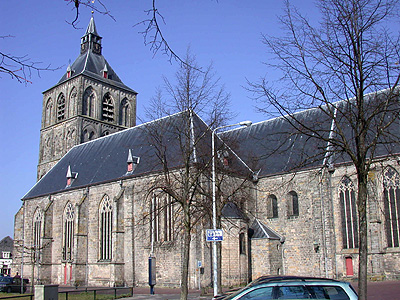
Basilica of St. Plechelm, Oldenzaal

== Veneration ==
Plechelm was greatly honored at Sint Odiliënberg, and Ruramonde. Following the Norman invasion in the middle of the ninth century, the relics of Wiro, Plechelm, and Otger were moved to Utrecht. Plechelm was canonized by Pope Agapetus II about 950. In 954, Bishop Balderic of Utrecht had the relics of Plechelm transferred to the Basilica of St. Plechelm in Oldenzaal, which he had built to enshrine the remains.
