= Balderic of Utrecht =

Bishop of Utrecht from 918 (897–975)

Balderic
- Bishop of Utrecht
- Church: Catholic Church
- Diocese: Archdiocese of Utrecht
- In office: 918–975

Personal details
- Born: 897
- Died: 27 December 975

Balderic of Cleves (Oldenzaal, 897 – Utrecht, 27 December 975) was a long-reigning and influential Bishop of Utrecht from 918 to 975.

Although his father is only known from one document associating him with Betuwe, and his grave in his son's bishopric in Utrecht, the necrologium of Egmond in Utrecht calls his father count of Cleves (comes clivensis) and the necrologium of the Plechelmusbasilica in Oldenzaal, founded by Balderic, calls Balderic himself "Balderic of Cleves", "de clivis". Jongbloed (2006) argues that although the style of the title seems to be from a later generation, it should not be ignored. He also points to other evidence that the family had associations with the area, which was then referred to as the Duffelgau or Tubelgau.

Balderic was a cousin of Duke Gilbert of Lorraine and the uncle of Bishop Balderic of Liège. He was the son of Count Ricfried in the Betuwe, who expelled the Vikings from Utrecht, after which Balderic, who like his immediate predecessors had resided in Deventer, was able to move the bishopric back to Utrecht.

In Utrecht, Balderic repaired the forerunner of the Cathedral of Utrecht, St. Martin, and rebuilt the St. Salvator Church, which had been destroyed by the Normans, as well as the convent school that was attached to the Cathedral Chapter. Under his influence, Utrecht became the most important city in the northern Netherlands and he expanded the power of the local diocese so that it could maintain itself between the surrounding counties. This was achieved through his support of the German king, who granted him possessions in return.

Balderic was very successful in this policy: in 923 he formed close relations with the German King Henry I (919-936), who in return entrusted Balderic with the education of his four-year-old son Bruno, future archbishop of Cologne.

Because of this, Balderic also kept close contact with Henry's other son and successor, King Otto I (936-973). He belonged to the Lorrainian lords that sided with Otto in his struggle with his sons in 953. In exchange, Otto granted Balderic the right of coinage in Utrecht, as well as the trade settlement Muiden including the important toll. Furthermore, he acquired hunting rights in Drenthe, and several possessions in the Gau (country subdivision) Lek and IJssel.

Balderic collected relics for the churches in Utrecht. These included the relics of saint Odulf for the St. Salvator Church and relics of saints Agnes and Pontian for the St. Martin's Church. In 954 he had the relics of Plechelm transferred to a church that he had rebuilt in Oldenzaal, Twente.

Balderic was the first bishop of Utrecht to be buried in the Cathedral of Saint-Martin. In 1481, an important part of his remains from Utrecht were moved to the St. Plechelmusbasilica in Oldenzaal and buried there, probably as a tribute to the founder of its chapter. The tombstone of that year is preserved and built into the west wall of the south aisle of the St. Plechelmusbasiliek.

Preceded by Saint Radboud	Bishop of Utrecht; 918–975	Succeeded by Folcmar (bishop)
