= History of Ireland (400–795) =

The early medieval history of Ireland, often referred to as Early Christian Ireland, spans the 5th to 8th centuries, from the gradual emergence out of the protohistoric period (Ogham inscriptions in Primitive Irish, mentions in Greco-Roman ethnography) to the beginning of the Viking Age. The period includes the Hiberno-Scottish mission of Christianised Ireland to regions of pagan Great Britain and the spread of Irish cultural influence to Continental Europe.

== Overview ==
Early Christian Ireland began after the country emerged from a mysterious decline in population and standards of living that archaeological evidence suggests lasted from c. 100 to 300 AD. During this period, called the Irish Dark Age by Thomas Charles-Edwards, the population was entirely rural and dispersed, with small ringforts the largest centres of human occupation. Some 40,000 of these are known, although there may have been as many as 50,000, and "archaeologists are agreed that the vast bulk of them are the farm enclosures of the well-to-do of early medieval Ireland". These commonly featured souterrains: underground passages and chambers for hiding in or escaping through. It is likely that raiding Great Britain for slaves and other loot gave an important boost to an otherwise almost entirely agricultural economy. The lakeside enclosures called crannógs continued to be used and seem especially associated with crafts.

The older view that early medieval Irish farming concentrated on livestock has been overturned by pollen studies and other evidence, and it is now clear that cereal farming was increasingly important from about AD 200 onwards, with barley and oats more important crops than rye, wheat and others. Cattle were greatly prized, and cattle-raiding constituted a large part of warfare, so cattle needed the constant presence of a herdsman in daylight hours and were put in an enclosure at night. By the end of the period, the largest herds were probably those of monasteries. Generally, mild Irish winters seem to have meant they were never put in roofed shelters in winter, although young calves might spend a period in the house. There was a very considerable clearance of forests in the early part of the period, such that by the 9th century, large tracts of forest appear to have been rare, and the native Scots pine cleared almost to extinction; the large areas of bogland were harder for the medieval Irish to affect.

By 800, small towns had started to form around some of the larger monasteries, such as Trim and Lismore, and some kings were based in them, but the foundation of larger towns by the Vikings had yet to occur. Otherwise, kings lived in ringforts larger than the norm, but generally similar; however the possession of luxury objects such as elaborate Celtic brooches was much greater among royalty. The latter part of the period was the peak of the Irish contribution to Insular art, whose surviving products include illuminated manuscripts, most famously the Book of Kells, brooches, which were worn by clergy as well as nobles, carved stone high crosses, and other isolated survivals of metalwork, such as the Derrynaflan and Ardagh Hoards.

== Early Christian history ==
Recorded Irish history begins with the introduction of Christianity and Latin literacy, beginning in the 5th century or possibly slightly before. When compared to neighbouring Insular societies, early Christian Ireland is well documented, at least for later periods, but these sources are not easy to interpret. Many questions remain unanswered and the study of early Christian Ireland continues to produce new theories and new discoveries. Since the later 19th century, when scholars such as Kuno Meyer and Whitley Stokes applied an increasingly rigorous approach to the study of written sources, a great deal of new information has been extracted from the written material. New fields, such as paleobotany, have contributed to the debate, while the volume of archaeological evidence has increased.

=== Ecclesiastical history ===
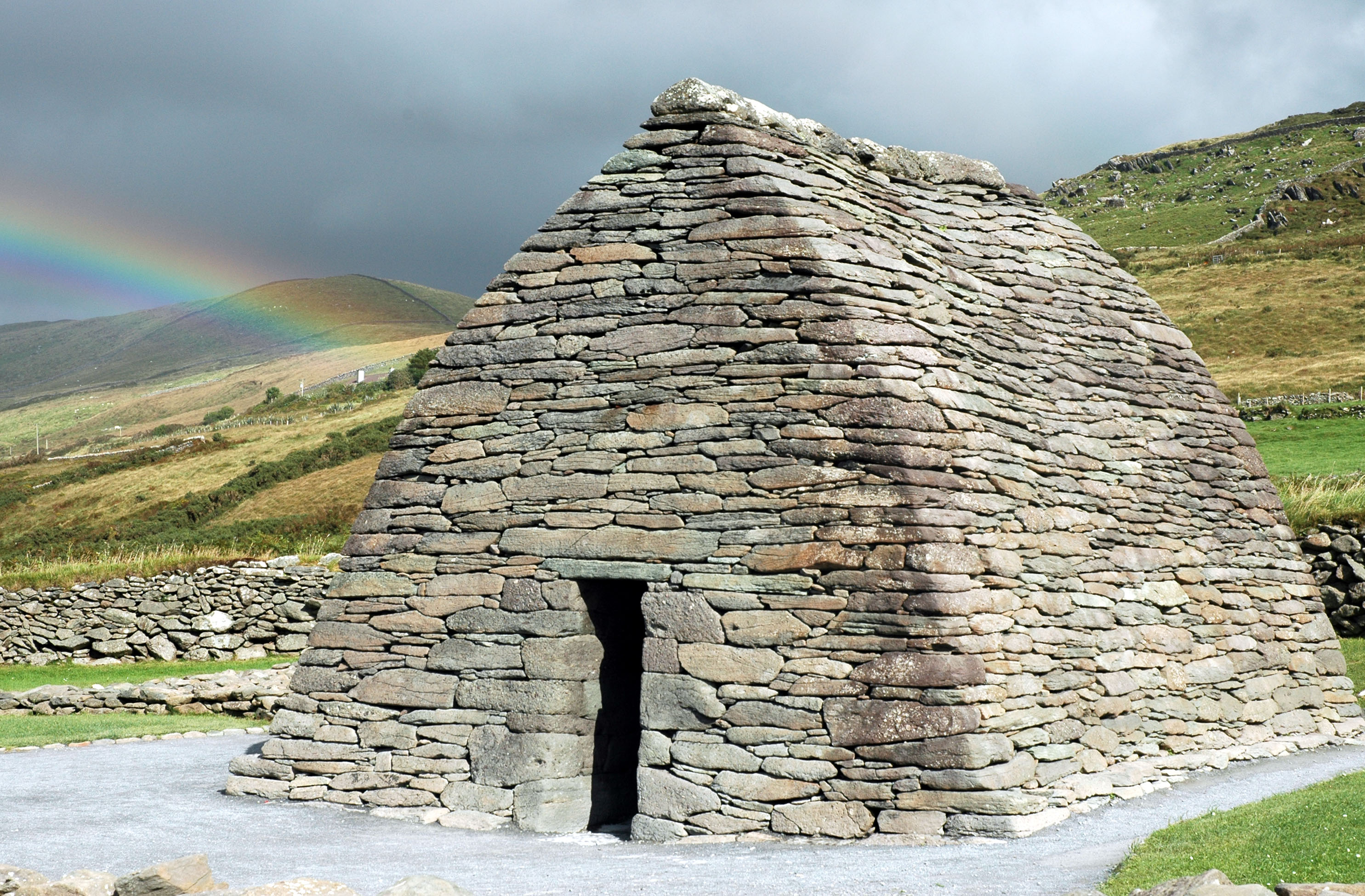
Gallarus Oratory, possibly one of the earliest churches built in Ireland.

The first reliable historical event in Irish history, recorded in the Chronicle of Prosper of Aquitaine, is the ordination by Pope Celestine I of Palladius as the first bishop to Irish Christians in 431 – which demonstrates that there were already Christians living in Ireland. Prosper says in his Contra Collatorem that by this act Celestine "made the barbarian island Christian", although it is clear the Christianisation of the island was a longer and more gradual process. The mission of Saint Patrick is traditionally dated around the same time – the earliest date for his arrival in Ireland in the Irish annals is 432 – although Patrick's own writings contain nothing securely dateable. It is likely that Palladius's activities were in the south of Ireland, perhaps associated with Cashel, while Patrick's were later, in the north, and associated with Armagh.

By the early 6th century the church had developed separate dioceses, with bishops as the most senior ecclesiastical figures, but the country was still predominantly pagan. The High Kings of Ireland continued pagan practices until the reign of Diarmait mac Cerbaill c. 558, traditionally the first Christian High King. The monastic movement, headed by abbots, took hold in the mid 6th century, and by 700 Ireland was at least nominally a Christian country, with the church fully part of Irish society. The status of ecclesiastics was regulated by secular law, and many leading ecclesiastics came from aristocratic Irish families. Monasteries in the 8th century even went to war with each other.

From the 7th century on, Irish churchmen such as Columbanus and Columba were active in Gaul, in Scotland and in Anglo-Saxon England. The mixing of Irish, Pictish, Anglo-Saxon and even Byzantine styles created the Insular style of art, represented by the Lindisfarne Gospels and the Book of Kells. Ireland's reputation for scholarship was such that many scholars travelled from Britain and the European mainland to study in Irish schools.

=== Political history ===
Eoin MacNeill identified the "oldest certain fact in the political history of Ireland" as the existence in late prehistory of a pentarchy, probably consisting of the cóiceda or "fifths" of the Ulaid (Ulster), the Connachta (Connacht), the Laigin (Leinster), Mumu (Munster) and Mide (Meath), although some accounts discount Mide and split Mumu in two. However, by the dawn of history this pentarchy no longer existed. The rise of new dynasties, notably the Uí Néill in the north and midlands and the Eóganachta in the south-west, changed the political landscape. The Uí Néill, or their parent group the Connachta, reduced the former fifth of the Ulaid to counties Down and Antrim in the 4th or 5th centuries, establishing the tributary kingdom of the Airgíalla in the centre and the Uí Néill kingdom of Ailech in the west of the old province. Early Irish annals also show regular warfare between the Uí Néill and the Laigin in the midlands, with the Uí Néill conquering as far south as the Kildare/Offaly border, and claiming the kingship of Tara, beginning to be conceptualised as the High Kingship of Ireland. This led to a new division of the country into two halves, Leth Cuinn, "Conn's half" after Conn of the Hundred Battles, supposed ancestor of the Uí Néill and Connachta, in the north, and Leth Moga, "Mug's half", after Mug Nuadat, supposed ancestor of the Eoganachta, in the south. Dynastic propaganda claimed this was a traditional division dating back to the 2nd century, but it probably originated in the 8th, at the height of Uí Néill power.

== See also ==
- Gaelic Ireland
- Women in a Celtic Church

== Bibliography ==
- Flechner, Roy; Meeder, Sven, eds. (2016). The Irish in Early Medieval Europe: Identity, Culture and Religion. London: Palgrave Macmillan. ISBN 9781137430595.
- Green, Alice Stopford (1925). History of the Irish state to 1014. London: Macmillan.
- Skene, William (1889). Celtic Scotland — A history of ancient Alban. Vol. III. Edinburgh: David Douglas.
- Foster, R.F., ed. (1989). The Oxford Illustrated History of Ireland. Oxford: Oxford University Press. ISBN 0-19-822970-4.
- Neill, Kenneth (1979). The Irish people. An illustrated history. Dublin: Gill & Macmillan. ISBN 0-7171-0915-1.
- Ó Cróinín, Dáibhí, ed. (2008). A New History of Ireland: Prehistoric and Early Ireland. Vol. 1. Oxford University Press. ISBN 978-0-19-922665-8.
- Downham, Clare (2017). Medieval Ireland. Cambridge: Cambridge University Press. ISBN 9781107651654.
- O'Corráin, Donnacha (1972). Ireland before the Normans. The Gill history of Ireland. Dublin: Gill & Macmillan. ISBN 0-7171-0559-8.
