= Mound of the Hostages =

Neolithic Passage Tomb in Ireland

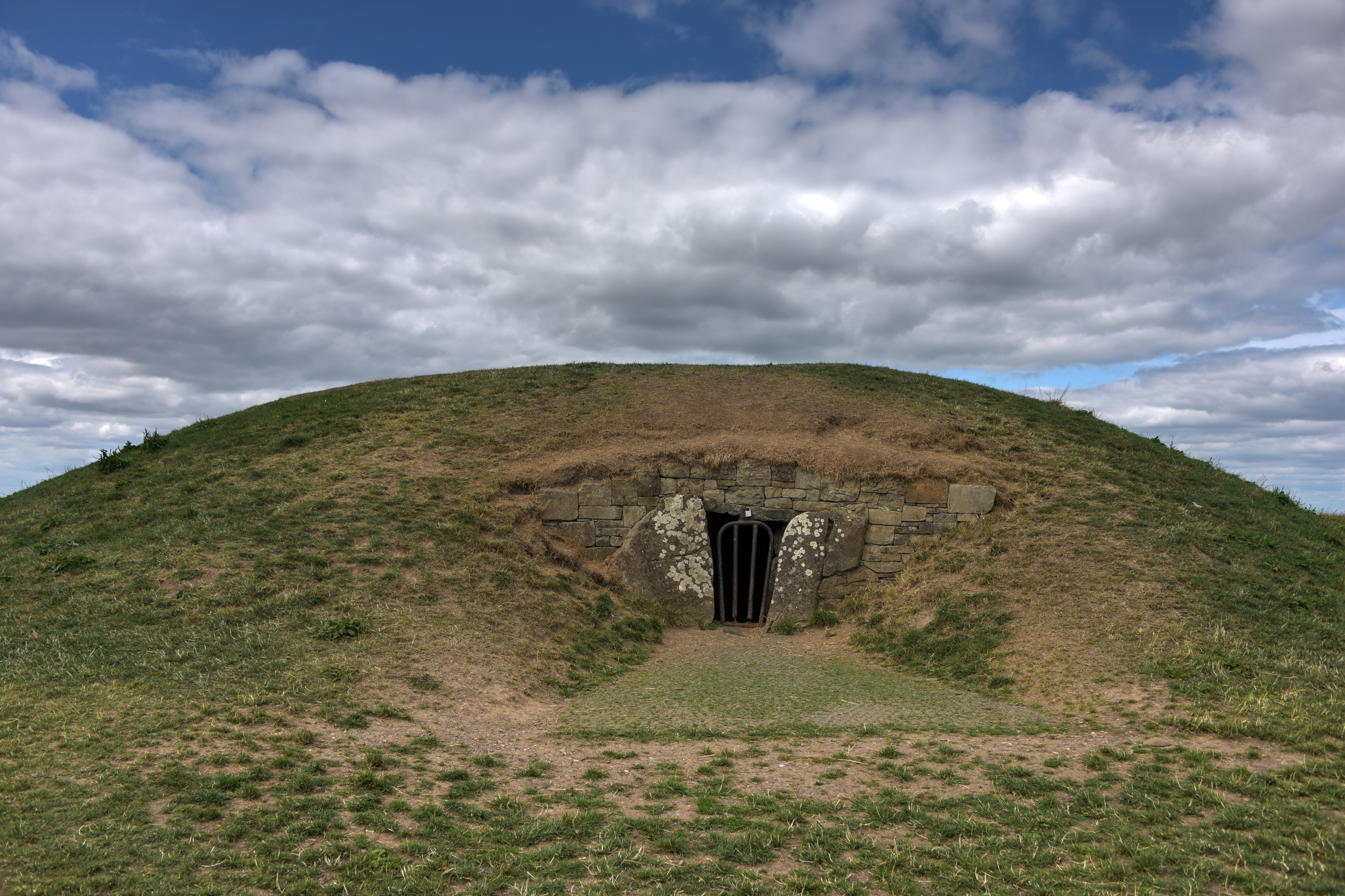
- The tomb in 2018
- Interactive map of Mound of the Hostages
- 53°34′46″N 6°36′42″W
- Type: Tomb
- Location: County Meath, Ireland

History
- Built: c. 3100 BC

Site notes
- Material: Stone
- Height: 3 m (9.8 ft)
- Diameter: 15 m (49 ft)

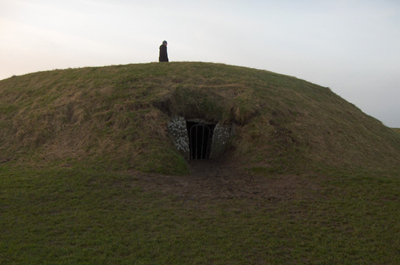
The tomb in 2000

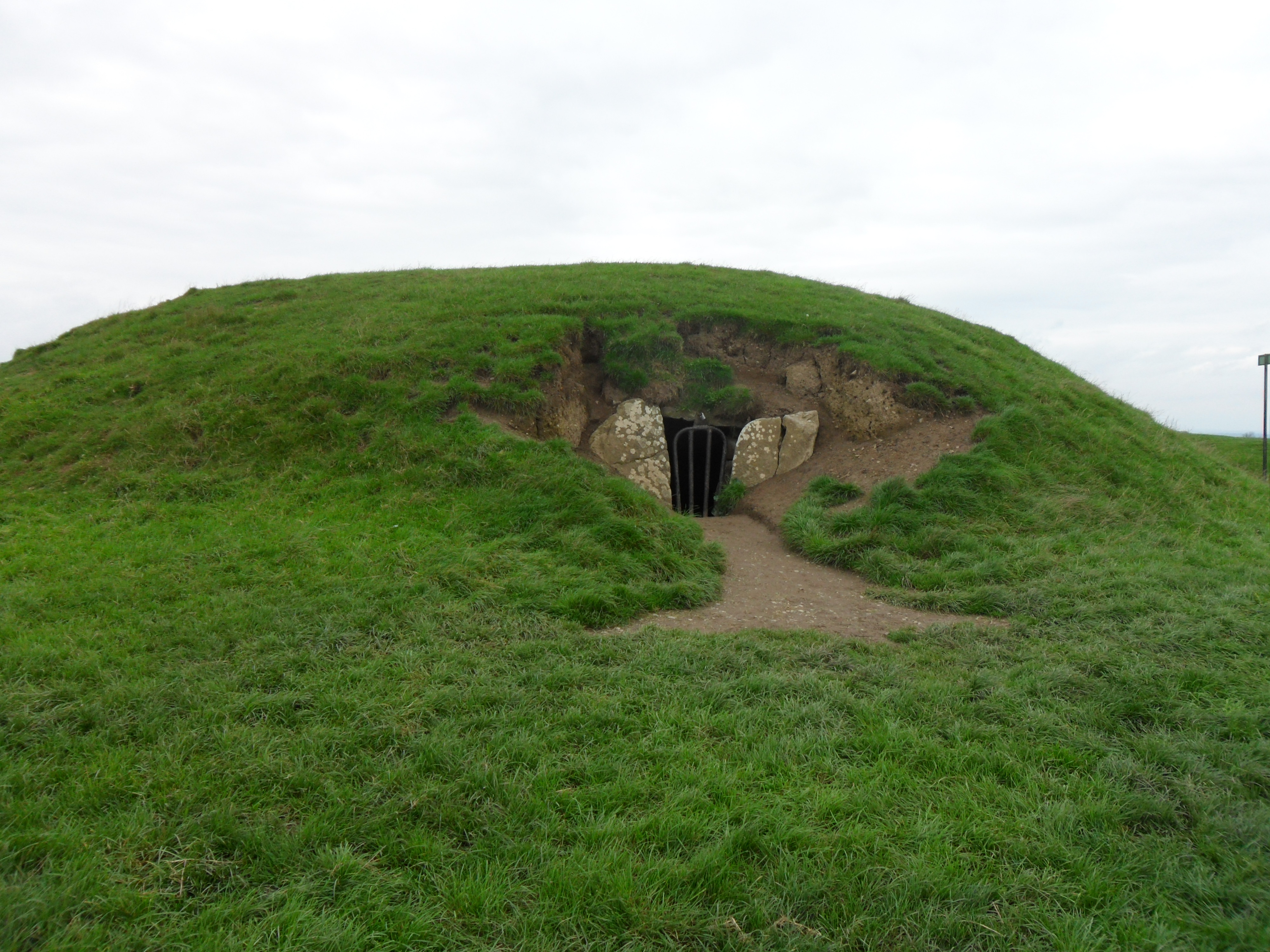
The tomb in 2011

The Mound of the Hostages (Irish: Dumha na nGiall) is an ancient passage tomb located in the Tara-Skryne Valley in County Meath, Leinster, Ireland. The mound is a Neolithic structure, built between 3350 and 2800 BC. It is circular in form, roughly 15 metres in diameter and three metres high. It is built in the same style as the Newgrange tomb. The structure is dome-shaped with an inset for the entrance and a small doorway, set almost one metre into the side of the monument. The doorway is framed with undecorated standing stones. As is common in passage tombs, this alignment allows for the rising sun to shine down the passageway at only two times of the year, illuminating the chamber within. At this mound, the passage is illuminated on the mornings of Samhain and Imbolc, at the beginning of November and February, respectively. Inside, the passage into the Mound of the Hostages stretches for four metres in length, one metre in width, and is 1.8 metres high. It contains decorated siltstones with images of swirls, circles, and x-patterns—designs associated with Neolithic passage tomb art. Three compartments once housed buried remains.

The mound was used for burials from the early Neolithic up to 1600-1700 BC. There are an estimated 250-500 bodies buried in the mound, organised into layers under the passage. The dead were most often cremated, and their ashes and grave goods spread on the floor of the tomb. These grave goods include decorative pottery and urns, stone beads, and bone pins. The remains were then covered with stone slabs. With this method, layers of ashes and stone built up over time and successive burials. More burials occurred at this site in the Bronze Age, and space in the passage eventually became unavailable, so the bodies were then placed in the mound itself. Over 40 remains have been removed from the mound. They had been buried in the Bronze Age style, with inverted cinerary urns placed over the cremation ashes. The full body of a Bronze Age adolescent was also discovered in the mound. The body was placed in a crouched position in a simple pit dug in the mound. Grave goods found with the body include a decorated bead necklace, a bronze knife, and a bronze awl—a suggestion that he was a person of some importance.

Unlike some similar structures, there is no evidence of a ditch dug around the mound. The Mound is situated north of the King's seat and Cormac's house (teach Cormaic) and slightly south of the Rath of the Synods. The top of the mound is the highest point on the hill and offers panoramic views of the surrounding countryside.

The excavation of the site started in 1952 with Seán P. Ó Ríordáin -Celtic Archaeology Professor at University College, Dublin- as its director. After Ríordáin's death, he was replaced by Ruaidhrí de Valera who finished the excavation in 1959. However, the excavation was only published in 2005 by Dr Muiris O’Sullivan.

== See also ==
- Rath Meave, is aligned with the Mound of the Hostages.
