= Hill of Tara =

Archaeological complex in County Meath, Ireland

- Teamhair (Irish)
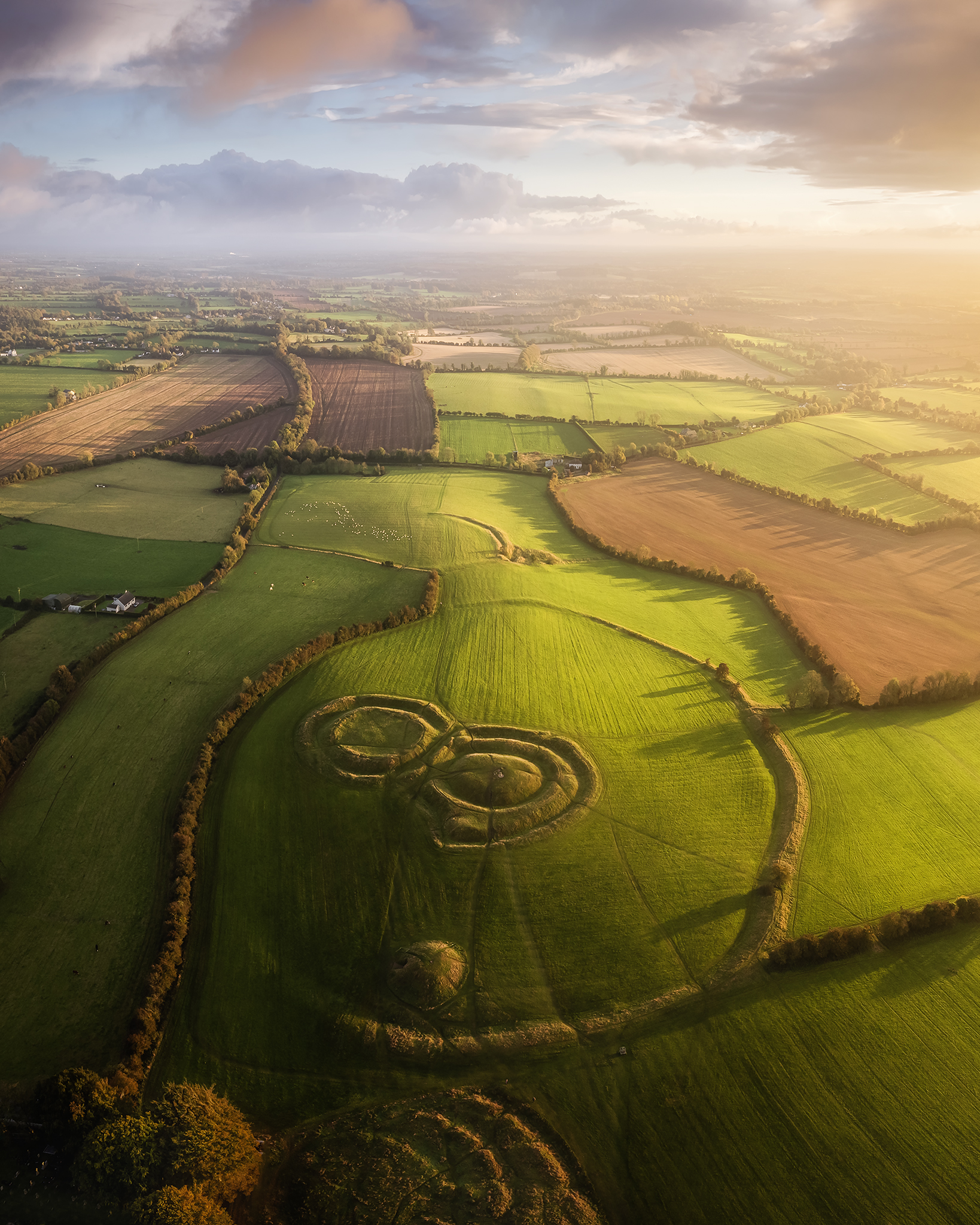
- Aerial view of the Hill of Tara, looking south

- Location within island of Ireland
- 53°34′39″N 6°36′43″W
- Type: Ceremonial and burial site
- Periods: Neolithic–Iron Age
- Cultures: Gaelic
- Location: County Meath, Ireland

Site notes
- Elevation: 155 m (509 ft)
- Owner: Currently the Irish Government through the Office of Public Works
- Management: The Office of Public Works

National monument of Ireland
- Official name: Hill of Tara
- Reference no.: 676

The Hill of Tara (Irish: Teamhair or Cnoc na Teamhrach) is a hill and ancient ceremonial and burial site near Skryne in County Meath, Ireland. Tradition identifies the hill as the inauguration place and seat of the High Kings of Ireland; it also appears in Irish mythology. Tara consists of numerous monuments and earthworks—dating from the Neolithic to the Iron Age—including a passage tomb (the "Mound of the Hostages"), burial mounds, round enclosures, a standing stone (believed to be the Lia Fáil or "Stone of Destiny"), and a ceremonial avenue. There is also a church and graveyard on the hill. Tara forms part of a larger ancient landscape and Tara itself is a protected national monument under the care of the Office of Public Works, an agency of the Irish Government.

== Name ==
The name Tara is an anglicization of the Irish name Teamhair or Cnoc na Teamhrach ('hill of Tara'). It is also known as Teamhair na Rí ('Tara of the kings'), and formerly also Liathdruim ('the grey ridge'). The Old Irish form is Temair. It is believed this comes from Proto-Celtic *Temris and means a 'sanctuary' or 'sacred space' cut off for ceremony, cognate with the Greek temenos (τέμενος) and Latin templum. Another suggestion is that it means "a height with a view".

== Ancient monuments ==
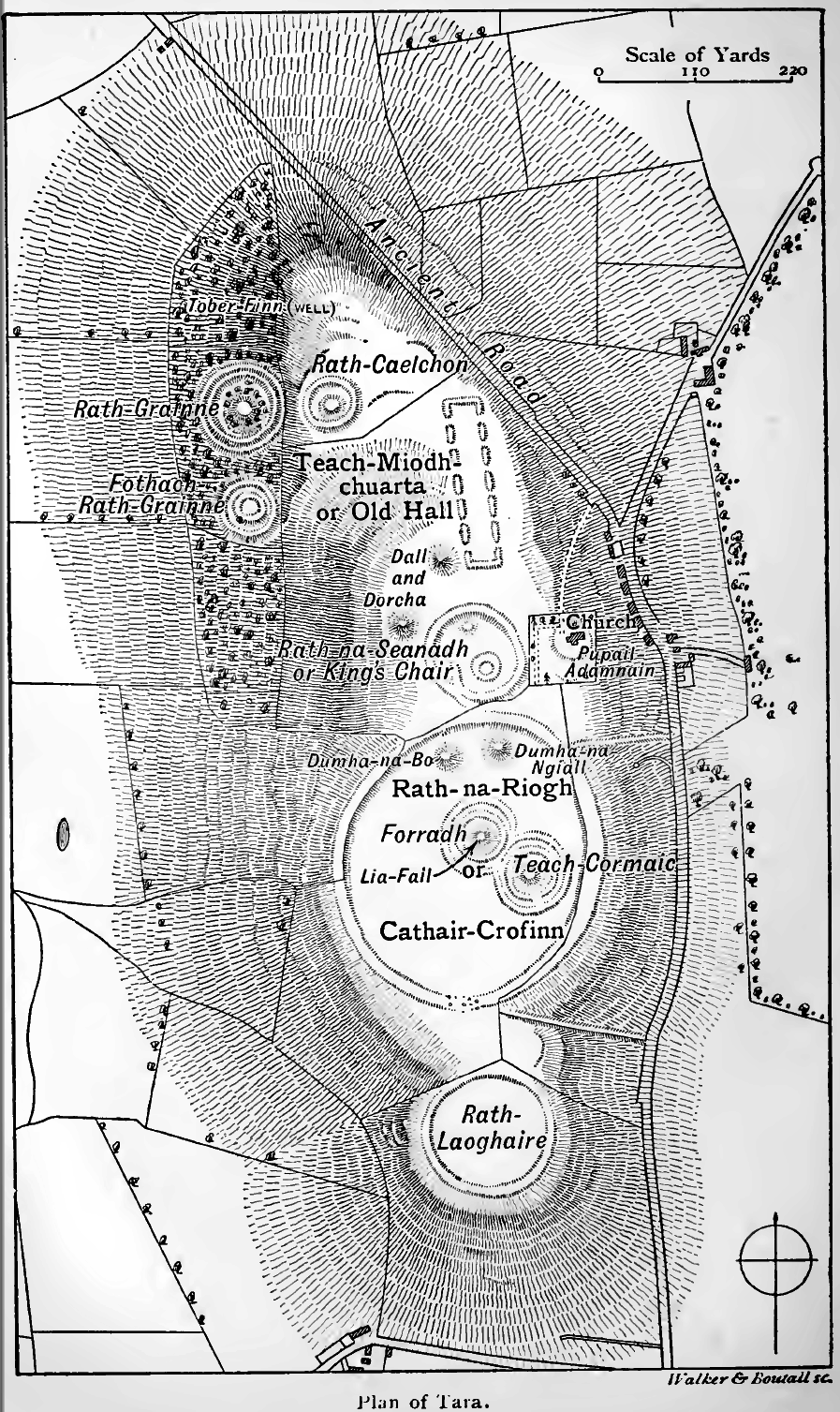
Layout of the Hill of Tara

The remains of twenty ancient monuments are visible, and at least three times that many have been found through geophysical surveys and aerial photography.

The oldest visible monument is Dumha na nGiall (the 'Mound of the Hostages'), a Neolithic passage tomb built around 3,200 BC. It holds the remains of hundreds of people, most of which are cremated bones. In the Neolithic, it was the communal tomb of a single community for about a century, during which there were almost 300 burials. Almost a millennium later, in the Bronze Age, there were a further 33 burials – first in the passage and then in the mound around it. During this time, only certain high-status individuals were buried there. At first, it was the tomb of one community, but later multiple communities came together to bury their elite there. The last burial was a full body burial of a young man of high status, with an ornate necklace and dagger. Two gold torcs were found there dating to around 2000 BC.

During the late Neolithic or early Bronze Age, a huge double timber circle or "wood henge" was built on the hilltop. It was 250m in diameter and surrounded the Mound of the Hostages. At least six smaller burial mounds were built in an arc around this timber circle, including those known as Dall, Dorcha, Dumha na mBan-Amhus ('Mound of the Mercenary Women') and Dumha na mBó ('Mound of the Cow'). The timber circle was eventually either removed or decayed, and the burial mounds are barely visible today.

There are several large round enclosures on the hill, which were built in the Iron Age. The biggest and most central of these is Ráth na Ríogh (the Enclosure of the Kings), which measures 1,000 metres (3,300 ft) in circumference, 318 metres (1,043 ft) north-south by 264 metres (866 ft) east-west, with an inner ditch and outer bank. It is dated to the 1st century BC and was originally marked out by a stakewall. Human burials, and a high concentration of horse and dog bones, were found in the ditch. Within the Ráth na Ríogh is the Mound of the Hostages and two round, double-ditched enclosures which together make a figure-of-eight shape. One is Teach Chormaic ('Cormac's House') and the other is the Forradh or Royal Seat, which incorporates earlier burial mounds. On top of the Forradh is a standing stone, which is believed to be the Lia Fáil ('Stone of Destiny') at which the High Kings were crowned. According to legend, the stone would let out a roar when the rightful king touched it. It is believed that the stone originally lay beside or on top of the Mound of the Hostages.

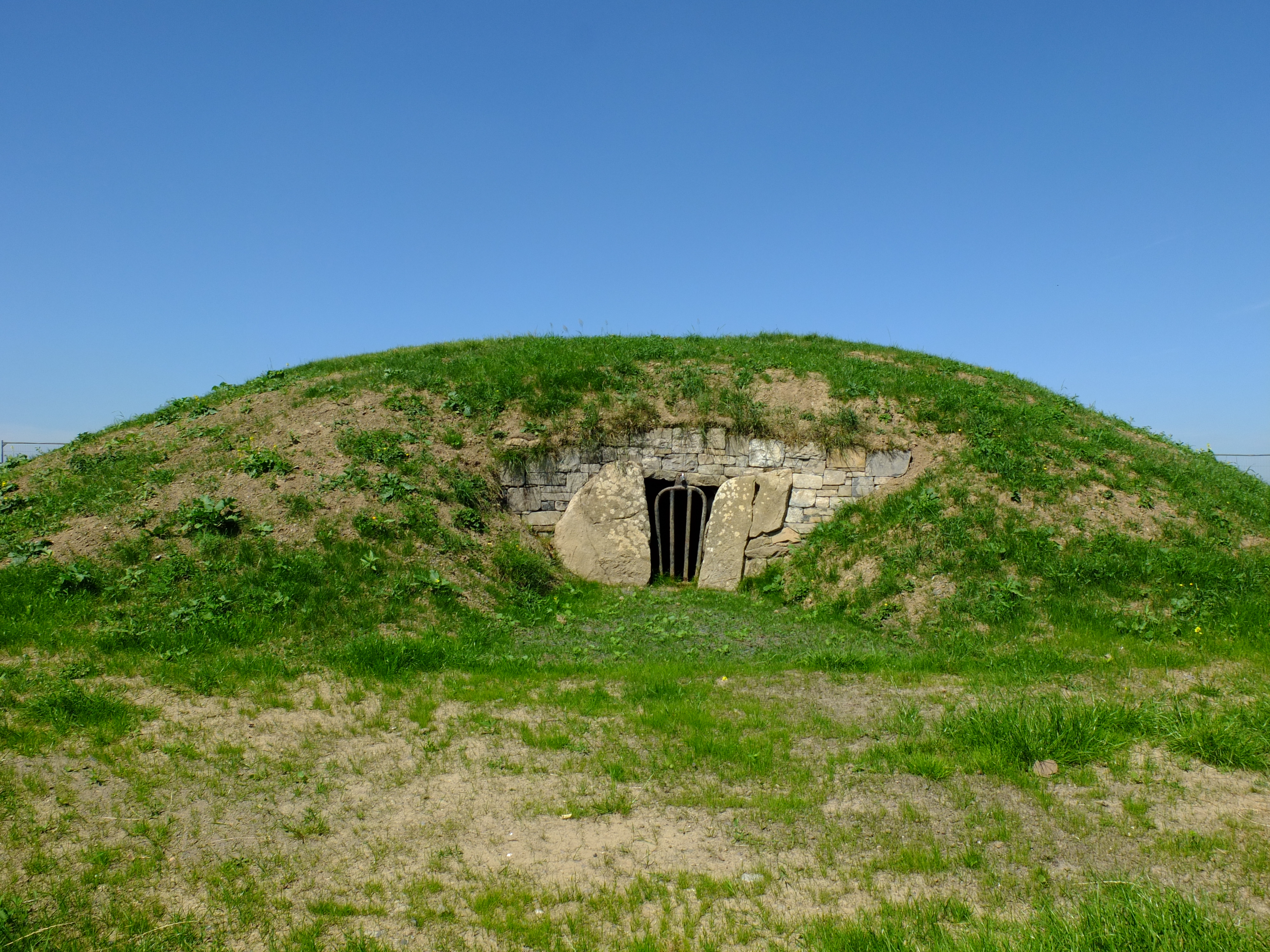
The "Mound of the Hostages"

Just to the north of Ráth na Ríogh, is Ráth na Seanadh (the 'Rath of the Synods'), which was built in the middle of the former "wood henge". It is a round enclosure with four rings of ditches and banks, and incorporates earlier burial mounds. It was re-modelled several times and once had a large timber building inside it, resembling the one at Navan. It was occupied between the 1st and 4th centuries AD, and Roman artefacts were also found there. It was badly mutilated in the early 20th century by British Israelites searching for the Ark of the Covenant.

The other round enclosures are Ráth Laoghaire ('Laoghaire's Fort', where the eponymous king is said to have been buried) at the southern edge of the hill, and the Claonfhearta ('Sloping Trenches' or 'Sloping Graves') at the northwestern edge, which includes Ráth Gráinne and Ráth Chaelchon. The Claonfhearta are burial mounds with ring ditches around them which sit on a slope.

At the northern end of the hill is Teach Miodhchuarta or 'Banqueting Hall'. This was likely the ceremonial avenue leading to the hilltop and seems to have been one of the last monuments built.

Half a mile south of the Hill of Tara is another large round enclosure known as Rath Meave, which refers to the legendary figure Medb or Medb Lethderg.

== Significance ==
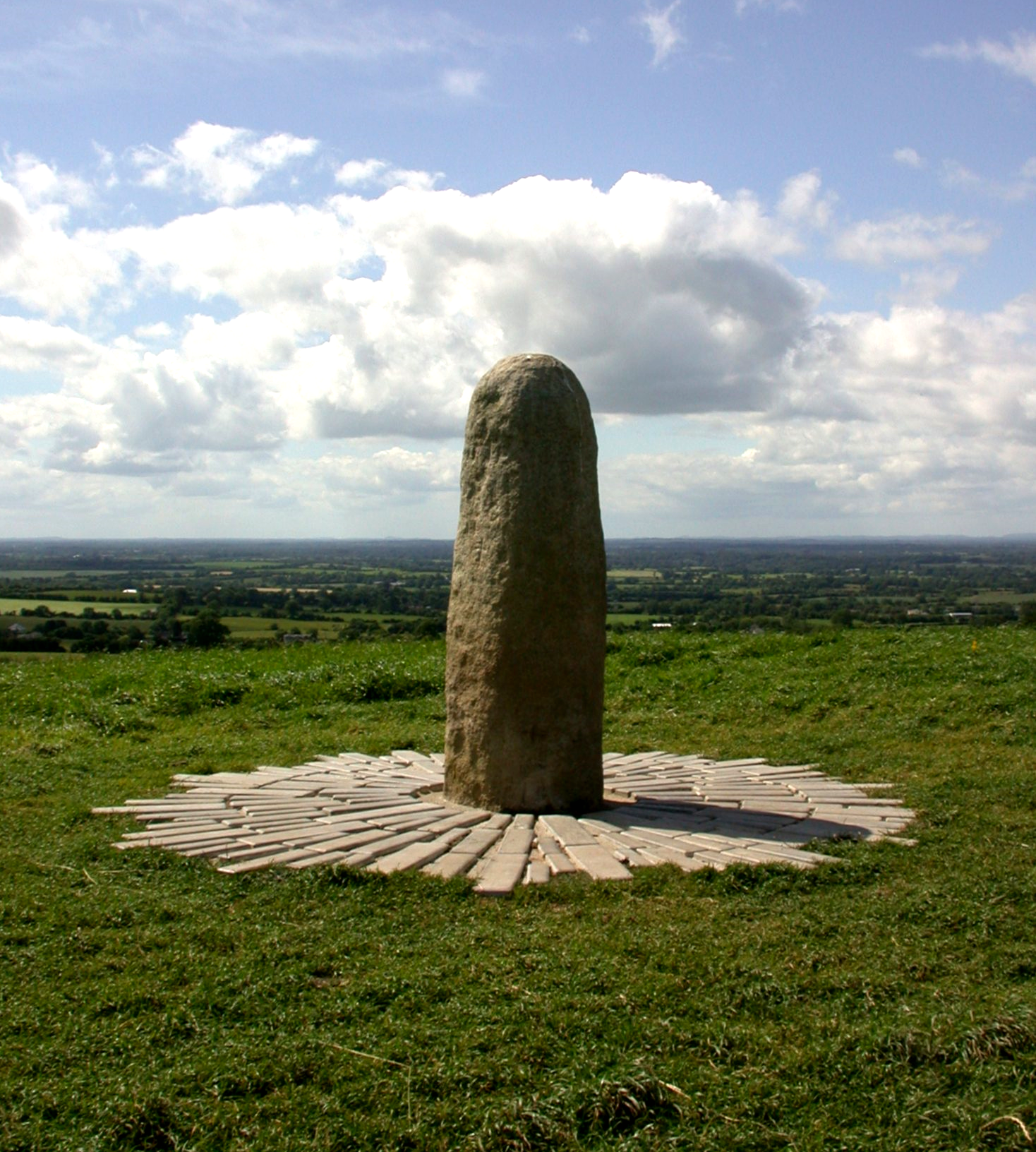
The Lia Fáil or Stone of Destiny

The passage of the Mound of the Hostages is aligned with the sunrise around the times of Samhain (the Gaelic festival marking the start of winter) and Imbolc (the festival marking the start of spring). The passage is shorter than monuments like Newgrange, making it less precise in providing alignments with the Sun, but Martin Brennan writes in The Stones of Time that "daily changes in the position of a 13-foot long sunbeam are more than adequate to determine specific dates". Early Irish literature records that a royal gathering called the 'feast of Tara' (feis Temro) was held there at Samhain.

By the beginning of Ireland's historical period, Tara had become the seat of a sacral kingship. Historian Dáibhí Ó Cróinín writes that Tara "possessed an aura that seemed to set it above" the other royal seats. It is recorded as the seat of the High King of Ireland (Ard Rí) and is "central to most of the great drama in early Irish literature". Various medieval king lists traced a line of High Kings far into the past. However, John T. Koch explains: "Although the kingship of Tara was a special kingship whose occupants had aspirations towards supremacy among the kings of Ireland, in political terms it is unlikely that any king had sufficient authority to dominate the whole island before the 9th century".

Irish legend says that the Lia Fáil (Stone of Destiny) at Tara was brought to Ireland by the divine Tuatha Dé Danann, and that it would cry out under the foot of the true king. Medb Lethderg was the sovereignty goddess of Tara. The cult of the sacral kingship of Tara is reflected in the legends of High King Conaire Mór, while another legendary High King, Cormac mac Airt, is presented as the ideal king. The reign of Diarmait mac Cerbaill, a historical king of Tara in the sixth century, was seen as particularly important by medieval writers. Although he was probably pagan, he was also influenced by Christian leaders and "stood chronologically between two worlds, the ancient pagan one and the new Christian one".

Tara was probably controlled by the Érainn before it was seized by the Laigin in the third century. Niall of the Nine Hostages displaced the Laigin from Tara in the fifth century and it became the ceremonial seat of the Uí Néill. The kingship of Tara alternated between the Southern and Northern Uí Néill until the eleventh century. After this, control of Dublin, Limerick, and Waterford became more important to a would-be High King than control of Tara.

According to Irish mythology, during the third century a great battle known as the Cath Gabhra took place between High King Cairbre Lifechair, and the Fianna led by Fionn Mac Cumhaill. The Fianna were heavily defeated; many of the graves of the Fianna covered the Rath of the Gabhra, most notably the grave of Oscar, son of Oisín.

The Irish annals record the Battle of Tara in 980 between the Gaelic Irish of Meath, led by Máel Sechnaill mac Domnaill, and the Norse Vikings of Dublin, led by Amlaíb Cuarán.

=== The Five Roads of Tara ===
According to legend, five ancient roads or slighe meet at Tara, linking it with all the provinces of Ireland. The earliest reference to the five roads of Tara was in the tale Togail Bruidne Da Derga (The Destruction of Da Derga's Hall).

The five roads are said to be:

- Slighe Assail, which went west towards Lough Owel, then to Rathcroghan.
- Slighe Midluachra, which went to Slane, then to Navan Fort, ending at Dunseverick.
- Slighe Cualann, which went through Dublin and through the old district of Cualann towards Waterford.
- Slighe Dala, which went towards and through Ossory.
- Slighe Mhór ('Great Highway'), which roughly followed the Esker Riada to County Galway.

== Later history ==
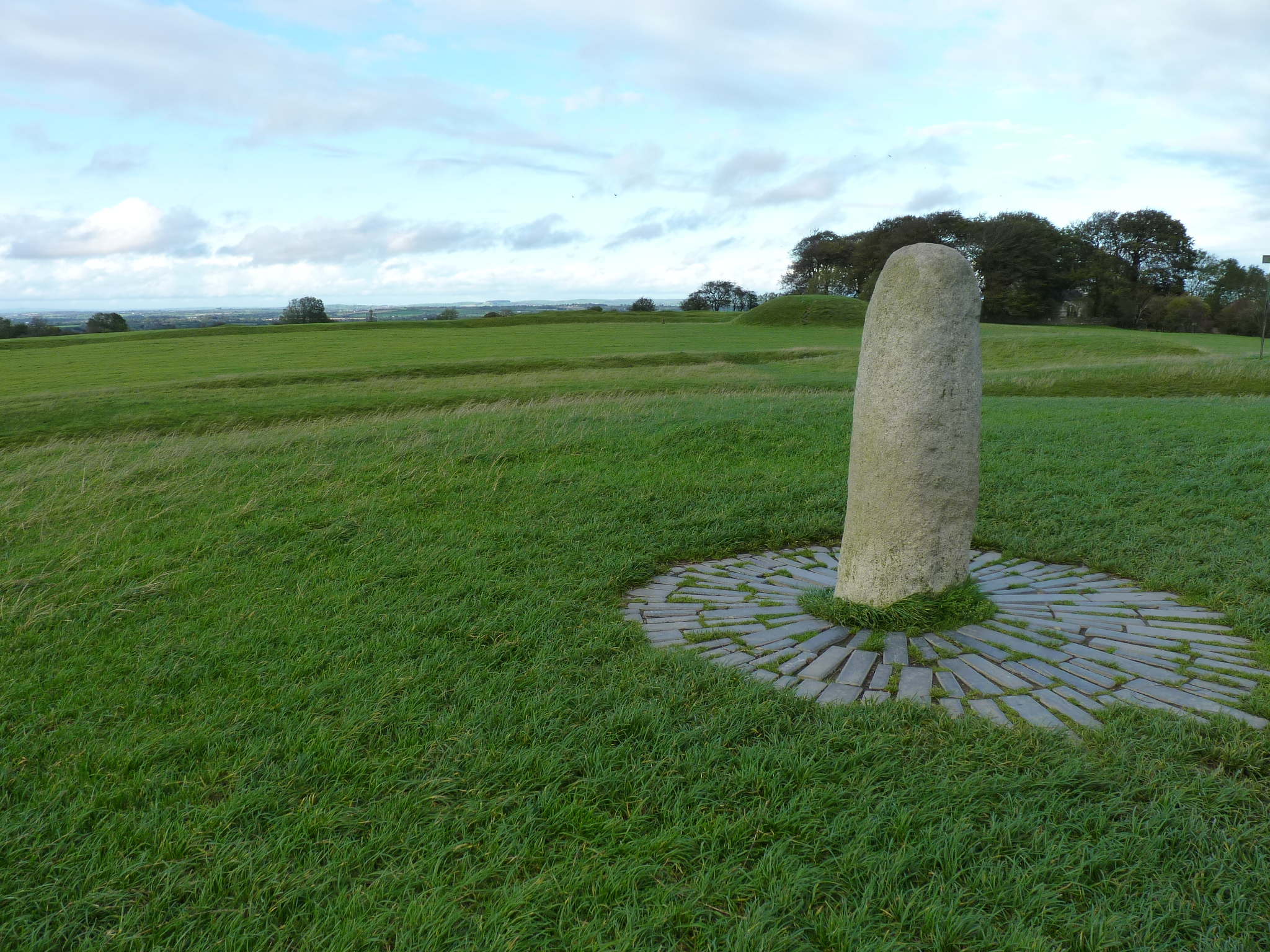
The Stone of Destiny and Mound of the Hostages

During the rebellion of 1798, United Irishmen formed a camp on the hill but were attacked and defeated by British troops on 26 May 1798 and the Lia Fáil was allegedly moved to commemorate the 400 rebels who died on the hill that day.

In 1843, the Irish nationalist leader Daniel O'Connell hosted a peaceful political demonstration at Tara in favour of Irish self-governance which drew over 750,000 people, highlighting the lasting significance of Tara.

British Prime Minister John Russell inherited the Tara estate during the 19th century. At the turn of the 20th century, Tara was vandalised by British Israelists who thought that the British were part of the Lost Tribes of Israel and that the hill contained the Ark of the Covenant. A group of British Israelists, led by retired Anglo-Indian judge Edward Wheeler Bird, set about excavating the site having paid off the landowner, Gustavus Villiers Briscoe. Irish cultural nationalists held a mass protest over the destruction of the national heritage site, including Douglas Hyde, Arthur Griffith, Maud Gonne, George Moore and W. B. Yeats. Hyde tried to interrupt the dig but was ordered away by a man wielding a rifle. Maud Gonne made a more flamboyant protest by relighting an old bonfire that Briscoe had lit to celebrate the coronation of Edward VII. She began to sing Thomas Davis's song "A Nation Once Again" by the fire, much to the consternation of the landlord and the police.

The Irish government bought the southern part of the hill in 1952, and the northern part in 1972.

The religious order Missionary Society of St. Columban had its international headquarters at Dalgan Park, just north of the Hill of Tara. The order was named after the Saint who was born in the Ancient Kingdom of Meath. The land Dalgan Park lies on was once owned by the kings of Tara. The seminary is also situated on the path of the Slighe Midluachra, one of the five ancient roads that meet at Tara.

=== Church ===
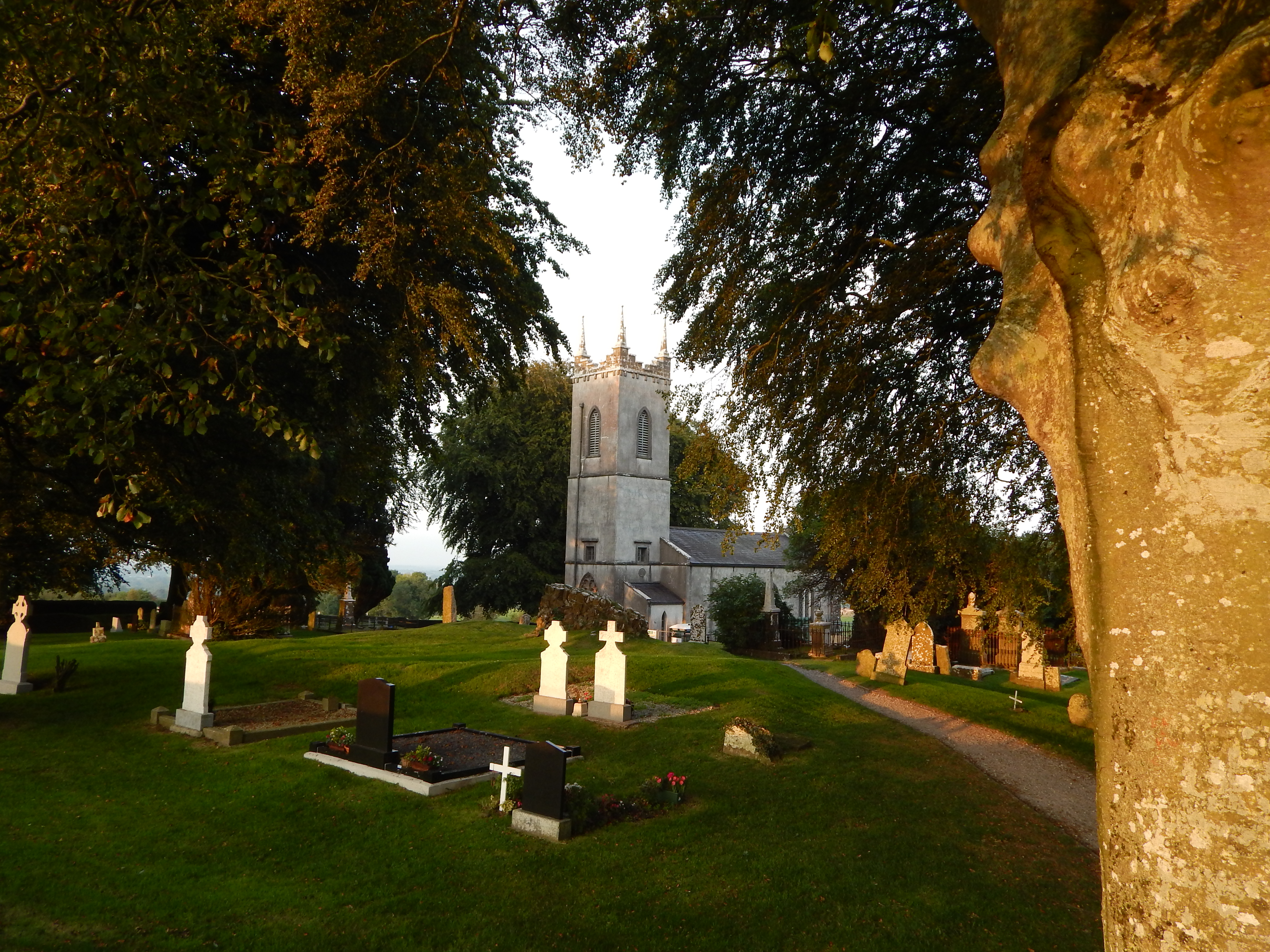
St Patrick's Church, now a visitor centre

A church, called Saint Patrick's, is on the eastern side of the hilltop. The "Rath of the Synods" has been partly destroyed by its churchyard. The modern church was built in 1822–23 on the site of an earlier one.

The earliest evidence of a church at Tara is a charter dating from the 1190s. In 1212, this church was "among the possessions confirmed to the Knights Hospitallers of Saint John of Kilmainham by Pope Innocent III". A 1791 illustration shows the church building internally divided into a nave and chancel, with a bell-tower over the western end. A stump of wall marks the site of the old church today, but some of its stonework was re-used in the current church.

The building is now used as a visitor centre, operated by the Office of Public Works (OPW), an agency of the Irish Government.

=== Motorway development ===
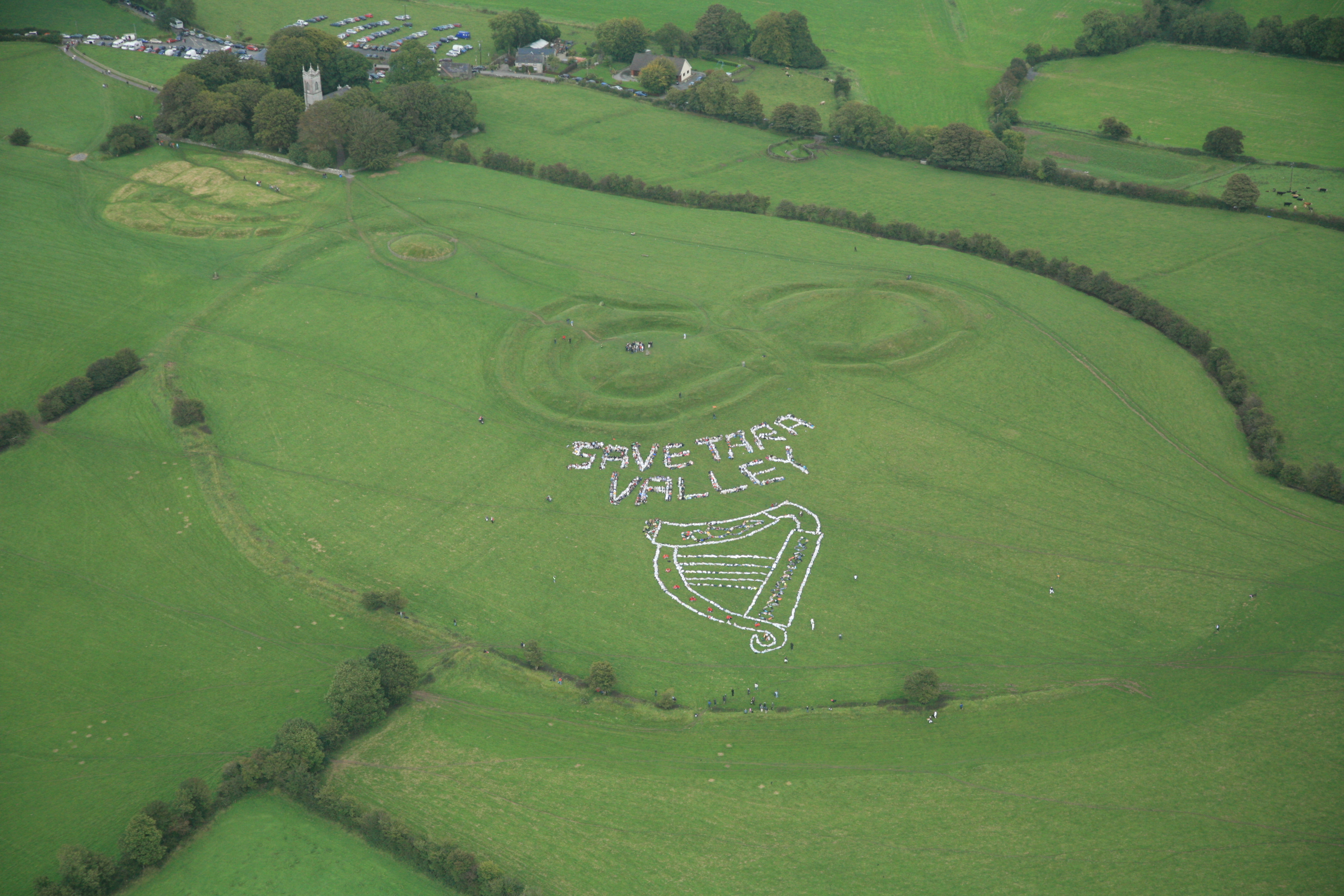
A protest against the proposed motorway, 2007

The M3 motorway passes through the Tara-Skryne Valley – as did the existing N3 road. Protesters argue that since the Tara Discovery Programme started in 1992, there is an appreciation that the Hill of Tara is just the central complex of a wider landscape. The distance between the motorway and the hill is 2.2 km (1.4 mi) – it intersects the old N3 at the Blundelstown interchange between the Hill of Tara and the Hill of Skryne. Protesters said that an alternative route about 6 km (3.7 mi) west of Tara would have been straighter, cheaper and less destructive. On Sunday 23 September 2007 over 1500 people met on the Hill of Tara to take part in a human sculpture representing a harp and spelling out the words "SAVE TARA VALLEY" as a call for the re-routing of the M3 motorway away from Tara. Actors Stuart Townsend and Jonathan Rhys Meyers attended this event. There was also a letter writing campaign to preserve the Hill of Tara.

The Hill of Tara was included in the World Monuments Fund's 2008 Watch List of the 100 Most Endangered Sites in the world. The following year it was included in a list of the 15 must-see endangered cultural treasures by the Smithsonian Institution.

The motorway project proceeded, and the road was opened in June 2010.

== Gallery ==
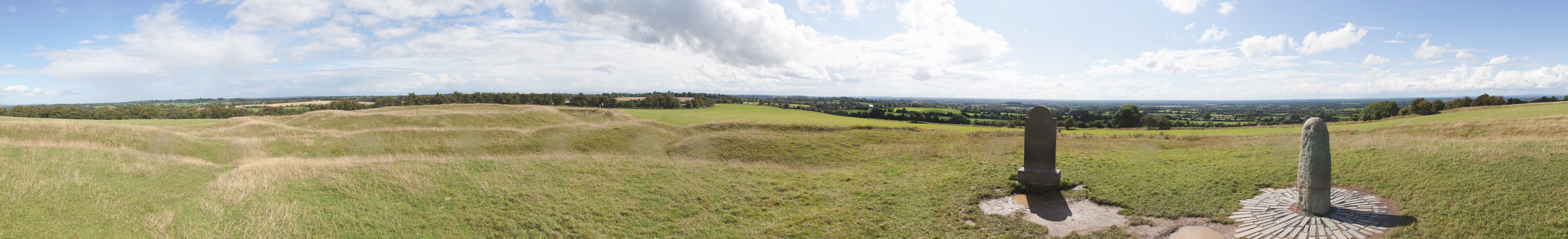
Hill of Tara, Lia Fáil and surrounding landscape

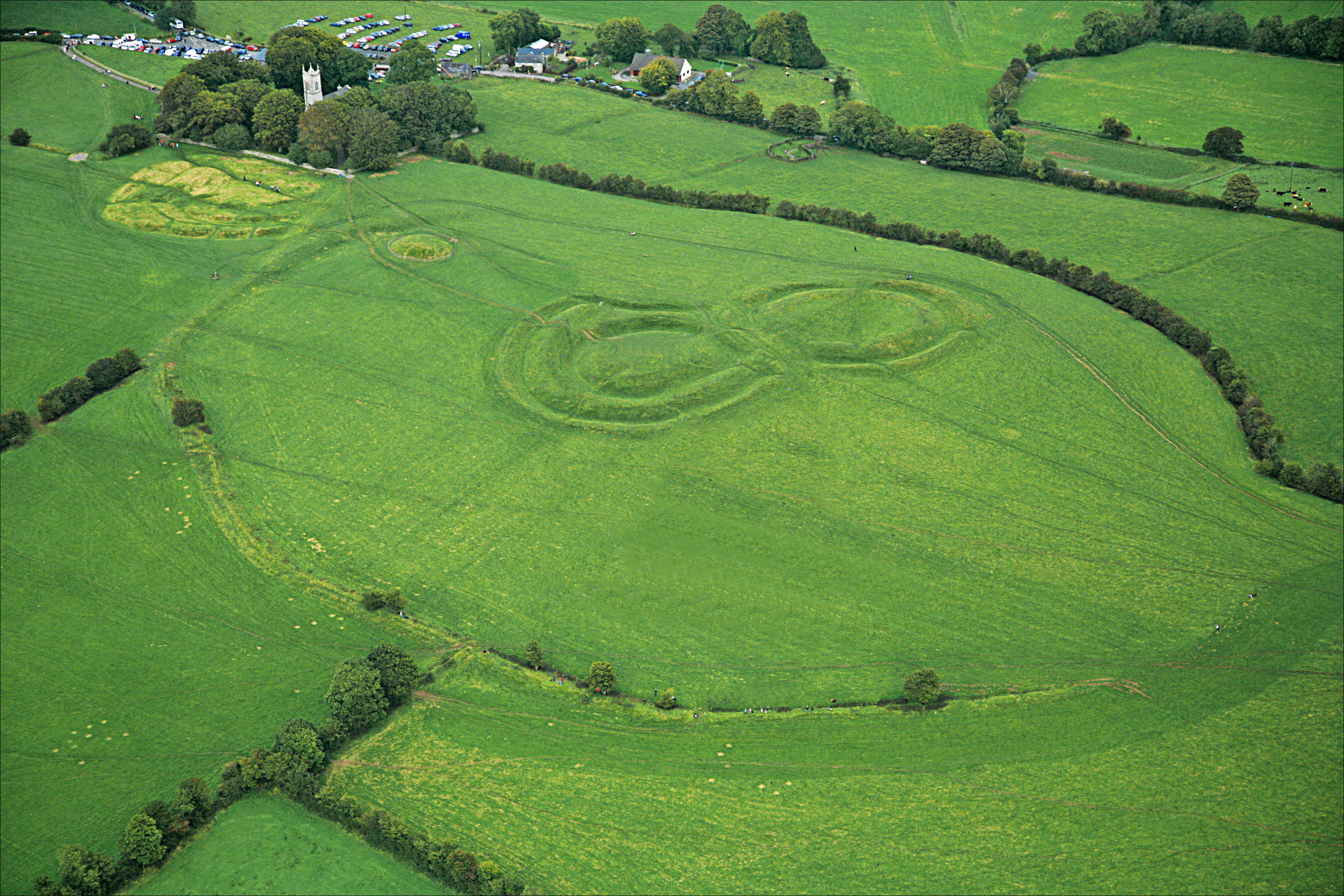
Aerial view

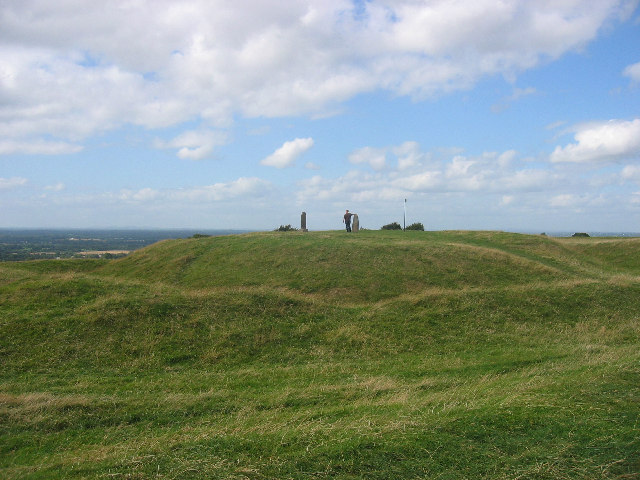
Summit

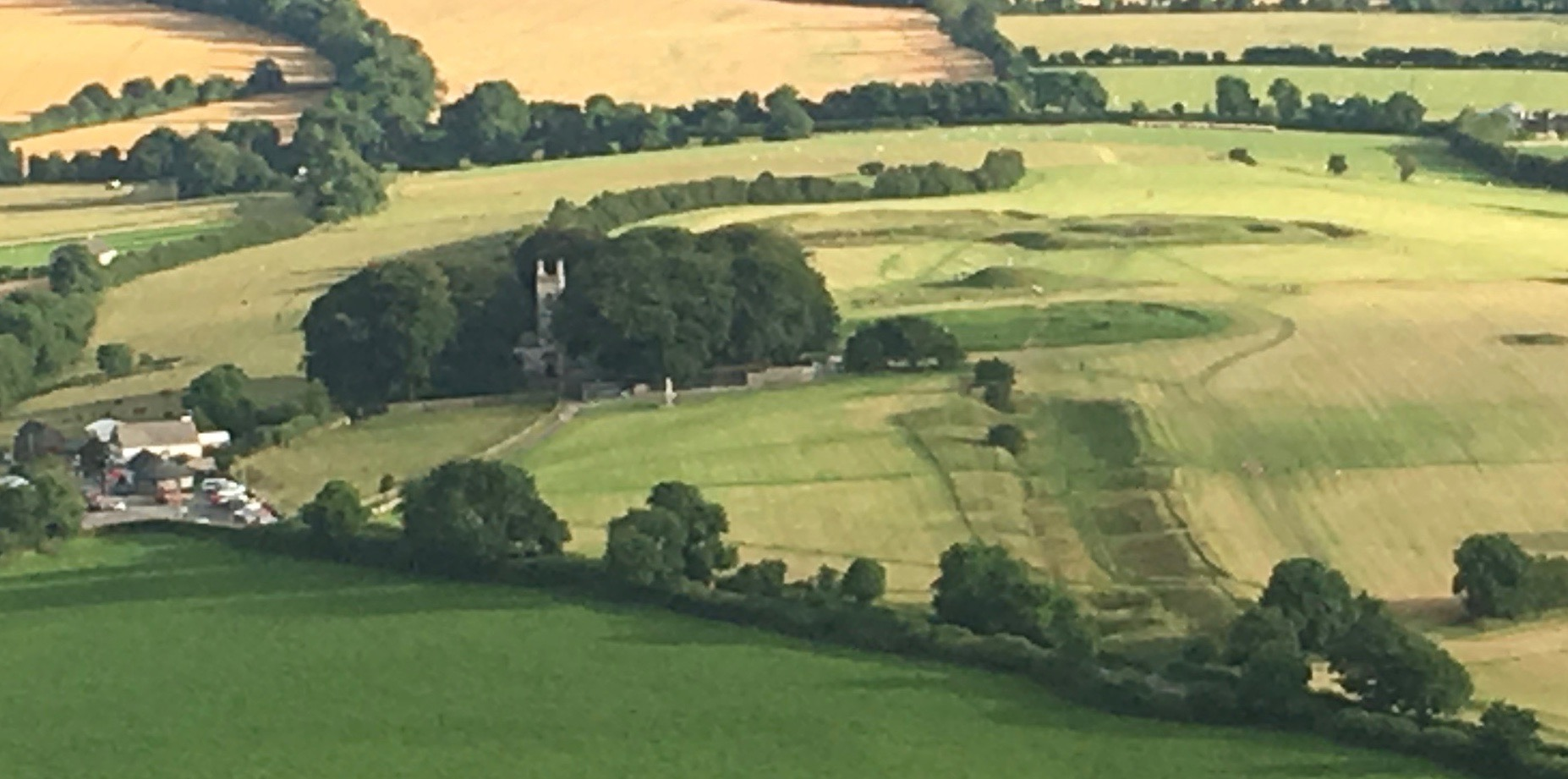
Aerial view

== See also ==
- Gamla Uppsala – Village outside Uppsala in Sweden, historic residence of Swedish kings of the legendary Yngling dynasty
- Kingship of Tara – List of Kings of Tara (sometimes also High Kings of Ireland)
- Stonehenge – Prehistoric monument in England
- Tara Brooch – Irish Celtic brooch, c. 7th century AD pennanular brooch named after, but not from Tara
- Faddan More Psalter – Early medieval psalter from Ireland, Book of Psalms, discovered 2006
- Hill of Ward – Hill in County Meath, Ireland, Close to Tara is the Hill of Ward, it's associated with the mythological druidess Tlachtga
- Hill of Uisneach – Hill in County Westmeath, Ireland, a druidic site associated with the festival of Bealtaine
