= Uí Fergusa =

Historical Irish kingdom

Uí Fergusa was a minor kingdom in early medieval Ireland, located near modern-day Dublin.

== Background ==
The kingdom was located in the area immediately west of what became Dublin, and took its name from the Uí Fergusa dynasty, who claimed descent from Fergus mac Dúnlang. Fergus was a grandson of Enna Nia mac Bressal Bélach. One of Bressal's other grandsons was Énnae Cennsalach, from whom many Kings of Leinster descended, so the Uí Fergusa were like the Uí Ceinnselaig of the Laigin nation.

Sources such as the Book of Leinster and Book of Ballymote state Uí Fergusa was situated between the river Liffey and Fir Cualan (Cuallan).

The kingdom may have succumbed to the Vikings sometime in the 9th century. A reference in the Annals of the Four Masters for 887 records the death of "Suibhne, son of Dunghus", king of Ui Fearghusa." Another entry for 909 claiming that "Caíróc son of Dunóc, king of Uí Fergusa, died." No further references are known to exist to it after this date.

It is not to be confused with Clann Fhergail, which was located in County Galway
