= Cualu =

Territory in Gaelic Ireland

Cualu or Cuala (genitive C[h]ualann) was a territory in Gaelic Ireland south of the River Liffey encompassing the Wicklow Mountains.

== History ==
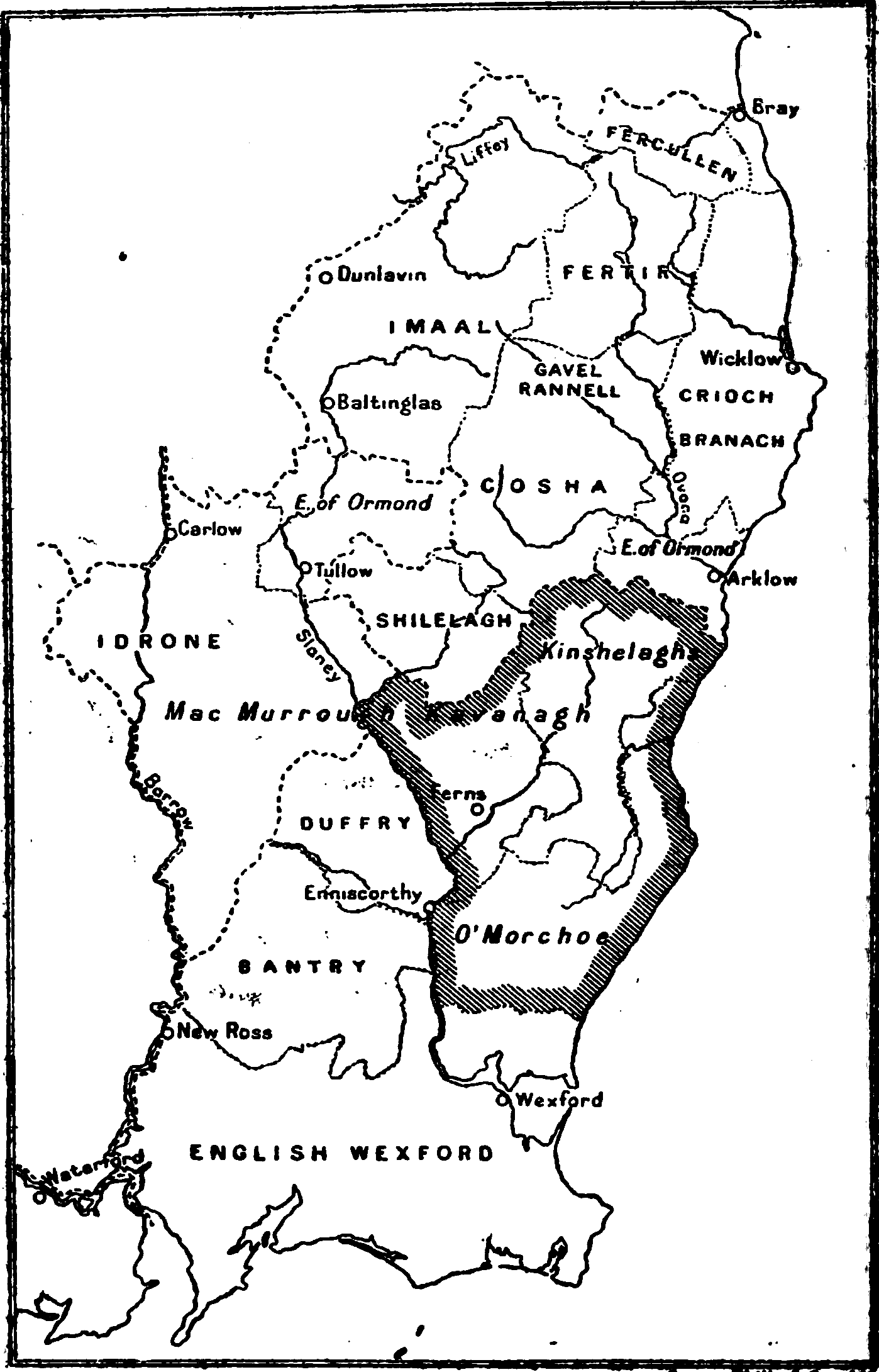
Map of southeast Ireland in the 16th century; Fercullen is visible in the northeast of the map

Edmund Hogan concludes from primary sources that it "seems to extend from Arklow to the Liffey, and to be coextensive with [the] diocese of Glendaloch". The Slíghe Chualann ["Cualu Way"] was a major road to Tara which crossed the Liffey at Áth Cliath ["Ford of Hurdles"], beside the later site of Dublin city. Henry Morris suggested, based on a story in a law tract, that the Fir Chualann ["men of Cualu"] had originally lived further north, in Brega around Tara, until displaced by the Ciannachta after the battle of Crionna. Among the kings of Leinster were Cellach Cualann (died 715) and Crimthann mac Áedo (died 633) who the Annals of Tigernach say was "of Cualu". "Tuathal son of Cremthann, king of Cualu" died in 778.

In the Lebor Gabála Érenn, Cualu was a son of Breogán, as were the founders of three territories further north: Brega, Muirtheimhne, and Cuailgne. The legendary Medb Lethderg was daughter of Conan, king of Cualu. James MacKillop identifies the Fir Chualann with the Cauci of Ptolemy's world map. As early as 1946, T. F. O'Rahilly had also suggested a possible connection between the two. The "ale of Cuala" was the prerogative in various texts of either the High King of Ireland or the king of Leinster. In Norman times, "Fera Cualann", anglicised Fercullen, was a smaller territory than ancient Cualu, encompassing the north Wicklow Mountains and ruled by the O'Toole family, which later became the manor of Powerscourt. The Irish name for Great Sugar Loaf mountain is Ó Cualann ["peak of Cualu"]. During the Gaelic revival, Cuala was revived by the Gaelic League as a name for south Dublin–north Wicklow. Cuala Press was a private press founded by W. B. Yeats' sisters which published works by him and colleagues. Brí Cualann was coined as an Irish name for Bray, County Wicklow, later rejected as inauthentic by the Placenames Branch. Cuala CLG is a Gaelic Athletic Association club based in Dalkey. Ceoltóirí Chualann was a 1960s Irish traditional music ensemble named by Seán Ó Riada after its home area.
