= Niamh (mythology) =

Character in Celtic mythology

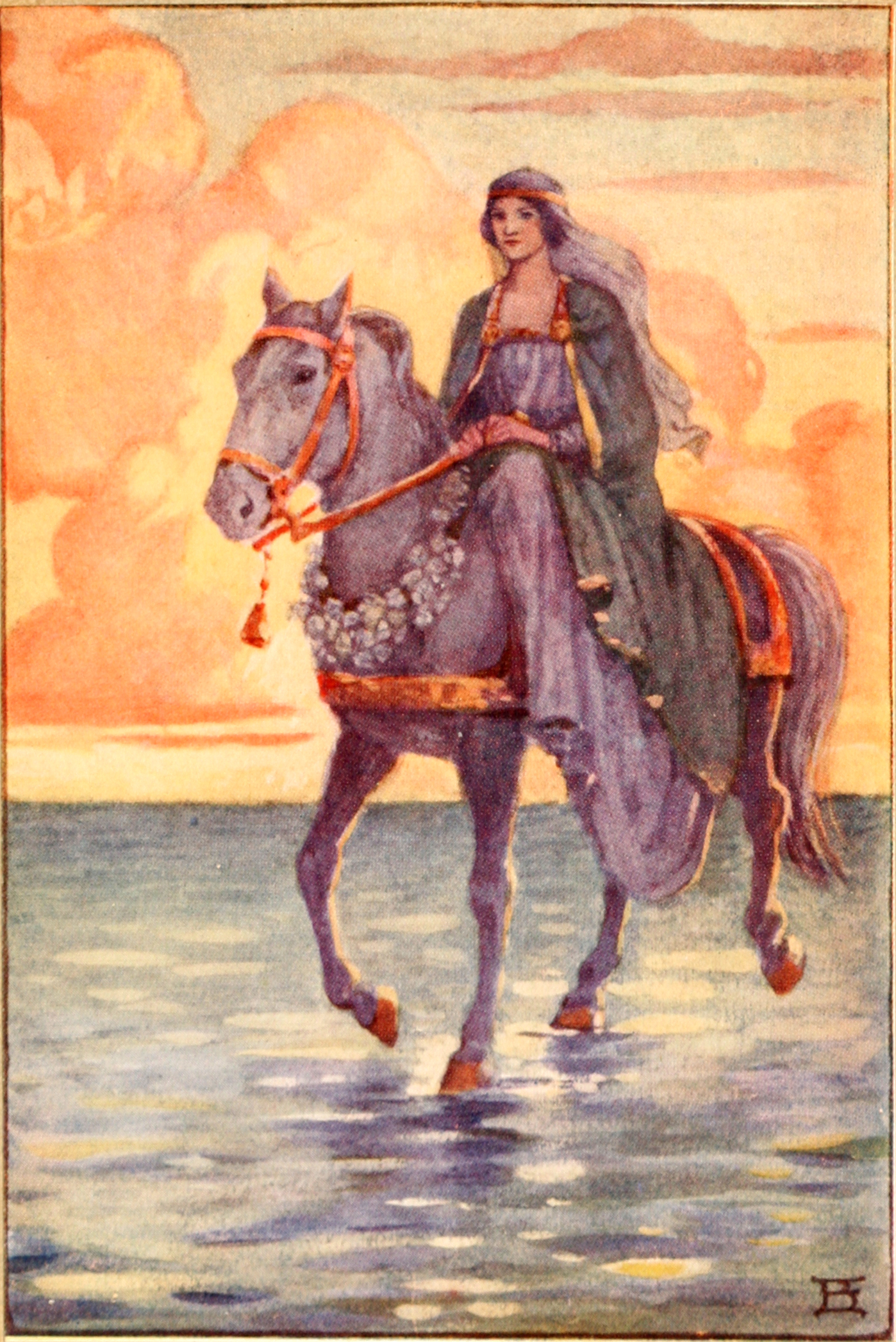
Niamh, illustrated by Beatrice Elvery in Heroes of the Dawn (1914)

Niamh (Irish: [n̠ʲiəw]), also known as Niamh Cinn-Óir ("Golden-headed Niamh" or "Golden-haired Niamh") is the lover or spouse of Oisín, son of Fionn mac Cumhail, in the Fianna Cycle of Irish mythology.

In the story of Niamh, she was an otherworldly woman who fell in love with an Irish man named Oisín and carried him away to live with her in her domain of Tír na nÓg, the Land of Youth. She had two sons and a daughter with Oisín. After more than 300 years of living together, Niamh reluctantly allowed Oisín to visit Ireland, imposing on him a taboo not to touch the ground there, and once he did, he turned old and was unable to go back to see Niamh ever again.

In the medieval version, Niamh was a mortal princess of Munster who eloped with Oisín to Ulster but committed suicide when her father's army arrived in pursuit.

== Summary ==
The familiar story of Niamh of Tír na nÓg was described in a poem around 1750 attributed to Mícheál Coimín (1676–1760), and summarized as follows:

Niamh came from beyond the sea westwards, riding a white steed, and found the Fianna on a deer hunt near Loch Léin (in County Kerry). (Note: Annotated as being the Lakes of Killarney, County Kerry).)

She identified herself as Niamh the Golden-headed, daughter of the King of the Land of Youth, (Note: The King's name being "Cailce (Brilliant)" is a misreading of "inghean chailce Ríogh na nÓg"(the chalk-white daughter of the King of the Land of Youth') in Str. 15.) and declared her love for Oisín son of Finn. She intended to take him to the Land of Youth (Tír na nÓg), and described the promises it held.

Oisín, already in love, consented to the proposition and the two rode off together on the white steed. When they witnessed the maiden of the Land of the Living (Tír na mBeo) being violently pursued by a giant (Fomhor Builleach of Dromloghach), they made a detour to the Land of Virtues, where Oisín championed the maiden and slew the giant.

Niamh and Oisín reached the Land of Youth, met the king and queen, and were married. The couple had three children (two sons they named Oscar and Finn, and the girl Plor na mBan "Flower of Women"). When he had spent 300 years or more, Oisín developed homesickness and wished to see his father and the Fianna back in Ireland. (It is reckoned that the 300 years only seemed like 3 years to him, in some retold versions). (Note: "Oisin in Tirnanoge", retold by P. W. Joyce.)

Niamh reluctantly agreed to let Oisín visit his home, allowing him to ride Embarr, her white steed, but she cautioned him not to touch Irish soil, warning that if he did, he would be unable to return. She feared the worst outcome. She told him the trip would be for naught since the Fianna were long gone from Ireland, and Christians now inhabited the land. Oisín returned to Ireland, and searched for the Fianna in vain. At a place called Gleann-an-Smoil (glen of the thrushes), Oisín was asked to help lift a marble flagstone, as the men holding it up underneath were being overcome by the weight. Oisín moved the stone, but in the effort, the horse's belt broke and he fell to ground, turning him into a feeble and blind old man. The horse fled.

This entire story of Niamh is told within the frame story of Oisín's dialogue with Saint Patrick.

== Modern text ==
The only Irish text preserved from the past which contains the story of Oisín and Niamh in Tír na nÓg is the poem Laoi[ḋ] Oisín A[i]r Ṫír Na N-Óg "The Lay of Oisin in the Land of the Youth", composed around 1750 and attributed to Mícheál Coimín (Michael Comyn, 1676–1760). (Note: Dáithí Ó hÓgáin is critical that Mackillop (1986), p. 32 is oblivious to other pieces of literature that allude to Niamh, but Ó hÓgáin does not specify which works he meant.) The poem may have been based on lost traditional material, although the opposite may be true, and the poet may have largely invented the story working from very basic hints about Oisin and Caílte's journeys to the fairy mounds (sídhe), as described in the Acallam na Senórach. (Note: Alan Bruford says he himself is willing to accept this idea, but notes that Gerard Murphy would have disagreed with him.) It has even been suggested that the folktale the poet borrowed from may not necessarily be Irish, since foreign tales of the same theme are numerous and widespread.

The story of Oisín's disappearance to Niamh's fairyland is regarded as one of several tales told to explain why Oisín was not killed in the Battle of Gabhra in which the Fianna were annihilated, and how he lived to tell his tale many centuries later.

== Medieval version ==
In the oldest text, Niamh, daughter of Aengus Tírech, king of Munster, eloped with Oisín to Ulster, spending six weeks there, until the king arrived in pursuit with a great host. She thereby killed herself by burying her face in the ground, alongside thirty women. The spot was named the Well of the Women (tipra an bhantrachta), and it was on the edge of the Lake of the Red Stag (loch and daimh dheirg). The account is given in the Acallam na Senórach. (Note: Mackillop lists Niamh daughter of Aed Donn of Ulster as another telling of this. However he incorrectly identifies Oisín as fighting for her. In the actual Acallam na Senórach, it is Oscar who fights.)

== See also ==
- The Wanderings of Oisin – 1889 poem by Yeats
