= Eachtach =

Eachtach (Ireland) was the daughter of Diarmuid Ua Duibhne and Gráinne.

In The Pursuit of Diarmuid and Gráinne the High King Cormac mac Airt promises the aging Fionn mac Cumhail his daughter Gráinne as a bride, but Gráinne falls in love instead with Diarmuid Ua Duibhne. The pair runs away together with Fionn in pursuit. The lovers are aided by Diarmuid's foster-father, the god Aengus. Eventually Fionn makes his peace with the couple. Years later, however, Fionn invites Diarmuid on a boar hunt, and Diarmuid is badly injured. Water drunk from Fionn's hands has the power of healing, but when Fionn gathers water he deliberately lets it run through his fingers before he gets back to Diarmuid, who dies.

In one version of the myth, Eachtach is present and begs Fionn to help her father but he refuses. To avenge her father's death, Eachtach gathered her brothers into an army and harried Fionn for four years until he was near death from the constant battles. In the end, Eachtach did not manage to kill Fionn.
