= Oscar (Irish mythology) =

Irish mythical hero

Oscar (oscara = "deer/god friend") is a figure in the Fenian Cycle of Irish mythology. He is the son of Oisín (the son of the epic hero Fionn mac Cumhail) and Niamh, and the brother of Plúr na mBan and Finn; his bride is called Malvina. Though possibly a later addition to the cycle, Oscar was a popular character, and appeared prominently in several later Fenian tales, serving his grandfather as one of the fianna.

In Bruidhean Chaorthainn (Fairy Palace of the Quicken Trees), Oscar swept off the head of Sinsar, the King of the World, in the battle on the ford of the Shannon River.

His death is described in the story Cath Gabhra (The Battle of Gabhra), which pits the increasingly corrupt Fianna against the Army of the High King of Ireland, Cairbre Lifechair. Cairbre, aided by defected Fianna warriors loyal to Goll mac Morna, receives his death blow from Oscar, but mortally wounds him with his steel chains as his final act. Oscar's death causes Fionn to weep for the only time in his life, and serves as the final blow to the Fianna's strength.

== Namesake ==
Oisín had a second son who was named Oscar, born between him and Niamh in Tir na nÓg. Together the couple had three children, the other son who was named Finn, and a daughter named Plor na mBan. The account occurs in the poem, "The Lay of Oisin on the Land of the Young", attributed to Mícheál Coimín in the 18th century.
