= Cairbre Lifechair =

Legendary High King of Ireland

Cairbre Lifechair ("lover of the Liffey"), son of Cormac mac Airt, was, according to medieval Irish legend and historical tradition, a High King of Ireland. He came to the throne after the death of Eochaid Gonnat. During his time Bresal Belach was king of Leinster, and refused to pay the bórama or cow-tribute to the High King, but Cairbre defeated him in the Battle of Dubchomar [source?], and from then on exacted the bórama without a battle.

== Reign ==
According to the 8th-century text known as The Expulsion of the Déisi, Cairbre takes the throne when his father Cormac is blinded by Óengus Gaíbúaibthech of the Déisi, it being against the law for the king to have any physical blemish. The chronicles indicate that Eochaid Gonnat succeeded Cormac, but was soon succeeded by Cairbre following his death in battle.

According to Cath Gabhra (The Battle of Gabhra), a narrative of the Fenian Cycle of Irish mythology, Cairbre married Aine, daughter of Fionn mac Cumhaill. During his reign, his sons Fiacha Sraibhtine and Eochaid Doimlen killed Óengus Gaíbúaibthech. To make peace, Cairbre betroths his daughter, Sgiam Sholais, to a Déisi prince. However, the fianna demand a tribute of twenty gold bars, which they claimed was customarily paid on such occasions. Cairbre decides the fianna have become too powerful, and raises a huge army from Ulster, Connacht and Leinster against them. They are joined by Goll mac Morna and his followers, who turn against their comrades in the fianna, but Munster and the Déisi side with the fianna. Cairbre's army wins in the Battle of Gabhra, but Cairbre himself falls in single combat against Fionn's grandson Oscar, who dies of his wounds shortly afterwards. Fionn himself either dies in the battle, or had been killed on the River Boyne the previous year. The only survivors of the fianna are Caílte mac Rónáin and Fionn's son Oisín.

Cairbre had ruled for seventeen, twenty-six or twenty-seven years. He was succeeded by Fothad Cairpthech and Fothad Airgthech, sons of Lugaid mac Con, ruling jointly. The chronology of Geoffrey Keating's Foras Feasa ar Éirinn dates his reign to 245–272, the Annals of the Four Masters to 267–284.

== Family tree ==
Conn Cétchathach	Eithne Táebfada
Art mac Cuinn	Achtan	Macnia mac Lugdach	Saruit
Cormac mac Airt	Eithne Ollamda	Lugaid mac Con
Aine	Cairbre Lifechair	Fothad Cairpthech	Fothad Airgthech
Fíacha Sroiptine	Eochaid Doimlén
Muiredach Tirech	Colla Uais	Colla Fo Chrí
Airgíalla
Uí Néill	Connachta	*	Uí Maine

Preceded by Eochaid Gonnat	High King of Ireland; FFE 245–272; AFM 267–284	Succeeded by Fothad Cairpthech and Fothad Airgthech
