= Fothad =

- Pronunciation: Old Irish: [ˈfoθəð] Modern Irish: [ˈfˠɔhə(w)]
- Gender: Male

Origin
- Origin: Irish
- Meaning: Foundation
- Region of origin: Ireland, Gaelic Scotland

Other names
- Related names: Fothadh

Fothad, later Fothadh, is an Old Irish and Scottish Gaelic male given name, meaning "foundation". Bearers include:

- Saint Fothad, 8th century bard and cleric
- Fothad Cairpthech and Fothad Airgthech, legendary joint High Kings of the 3rd century
- Fothad I of Cennrígmonaid, 10th century Scottish supposed bishop
- Fothad II of Cennrígmonaid, 11th century Scottish bishop
