= Fothad Cairpthech and Fothad Airgthech =

High Kings of Ireland

Fothad Cairpthech ("chariot-fighter"), and Fothad Airgthech ("pertaining to silver"), sons of Lugaid mac Con and Fuinche, daughter of Nár, were, according to medieval Irish legend and historical tradition, joint High Kings of Ireland. According to the poem Reicne Fothaid Canainne, there were three brothers called the Fothads, which was a nickname. The other brother was Fothad Canainne. The poem states Fothad Airgthech's real name was Oendia meaning "one god" and Fothad Cairpthech's real name was Tréndia meaning 'strong god'. However the Mongan tale below states Fothad Airgthech's first name was Eochaidh. They came to the throne after the death of Cairbre Lifechair. They ruled a year, until Fothadh Airgthech killed his brother, and was himself killed by Caílte mac Rónáin of the fianna, and the followers of Caibre's son Fiacha Sraibhtine, in the Battle of Ollarba. A dispute as to Fothad Airgthech's place of death is the subject of an Old Irish tale "Scél as-a:mberar combad hé Find mac Cumaill Mongán", the silver found in his grave is probably the reason for his last name. The chronology of Geoffrey Keating's Foras Feasa ar Éirinn dates their reign to 272–273, the Annals of the Four Masters to 284–285.

Preceded by Cairbre Lifechair	High Kings of Ireland; AFM 284–285; FFE 272–273	Succeeded by Fiacha Sraibhtine
