= Colin Dunne =

English-Irish dancer and choreographer

- Born: 1968 (age 57–58); Birmingham, England
- Education: Warwick University
- Occupations: Dancer, choreographer, actor
- Known for: Riverdance (1995–1998); Dancing on Dangerous Ground (1999–2000)

Colin Dunne (born 1968) is an English and Irish dancer and choreographer, best known for being a principal lead dancer in Riverdance in the 1990s. A leading figure in the world of traditional Irish dance, Dunne performed with Riverdance between 1995 and 1998 before starting his own production, Dancing on Dangerous Ground. He transitioned to contemporary dance in the 2000s, with his first solo show, Out of Time, premiering in 2008.

== Early life ==
Dunne was born in Birmingham, England, to Irish parents from Monaghan and Wexford. He followed his two older sisters to Irish dance class at the local school when he was just three years old. At the age of nine, he won his first World Championship title and was the first dancer to win the World, All England and All Ireland titles in the same year. At the age of 19, he was the youngest person ever to receive an Irish Post Award in recognition of his achievements in Irish dance. When he retired from competition at the age of 22, he had won a total of nine World, eleven Great Britain, nine All Ireland and eight All England titles.

Dunne graduated from Warwick University in 1989 with a Bachelor of Science degree in Economics before going on to work as a trainee accountant at the Birmingham offices of Arthur Andersen. At the same time, he had gained his dance teachers exam (T.C.RG) and was teaching in England, the United States, Australia, and New Zealand. He resigned from Arthur Andersen on the day he became a qualified chartered accountant to go on a month long tour of Canada with The Chieftains.

== Irish dance career ==
Between 1992 and 1995, Dunne toured regularly with musical groups The Chieftains and De Dannan. During this time, he formed a dance partnership with Jean Butler.

"I did over 900 performances. I left Riverdance because when you perform something 900 times in front of 3,000 or 4,000 people every night, I think a little piece of you dies off with every performance."

— Colin Dunne, September 2013

Dunne joined the cast and creative team of Riverdance in October 1995. He was originally invited to choreograph and perform a new number called Trading Taps. However, the day before the show was set to reopen at The Apollo in London, lead dancer and choreographer Michael Flatley left the production. Dunne subsequently stepped into the principal role on short notice. He toured with the show for the next three years, performing in its U.S. debuts in New York at Radio City Music Hall and in Los Angeles at the Pantages Theatre, as well as in Australia. His performances were featured in the Riverdance: Live From New York City DVD released in 1996. He also performed with the cast at the 39th Annual Grammy Awards. Dunne left the show in June 1998, after more than 900 performances.

Dunne's next project, Dancing on Dangerous Ground, was created alongside Jean Butler and was based on the myth of Diarmuid Agus Grainne. The show premiered at The Theatre Royal Drury Lane in London in December 1999 and went on to perform to full capacity at Radio City Music Hall in March 2000. The show closed in June 2000.

== Contemporary dance career ==
After an eighteen-month period living in New York, Dunne returned to Ireland in 2001 to take a position as artist-in-residence at the University of Limerick. That year, he took the Masters in Contemporary Dance Performance and began focusing on the creation of short solo works. After finishing his master's degree in 2002, Dunne sought collaborations with contemporary choreographers in parallel with his own solo creative work. In 2005, he joined Michael Keegan-Dolan's Fabulous Beast Dance Theatre for their production, The Bull. His performances in The Bull at The Barbican in 2007 earned him a nomination for a UK Critics Circle National Dance Awards (best male: modern dance).

In January 2008, Dunne's first full-length solo show, Out of Time, premiered at Glór Irish Music Centre. The show displayed a love-hate relationship with the dance that made him famous. As of May 2016, his show was still touring the United States.

In September 2016, Dunne's new collaborative show, Edges of Light, began touring Ireland. The show premiered in New York in June 2017 and continued to tour as of July 2018.

In 2018, Dunne won a TG4 Gradam Ceoil award for Musical Collaboration as part of the production Concert.

== Personal life ==
As of November 2019, Dunne was living in Limerick, Ireland.
