= Acallam Bec =

Acallam Bec or Agallamh Bheag ("The Little Colloquy") is the title of a medieval Irish compilation of fianaigecht tales, preserved in the fifteenth-century Book of Lismore and the Reeves manuscript. It is closely related to the Acallam na Senórach ("The Colloquy of the Elders"), of which it is sometimes considered to be a later recension. It differs from it in making Oisín rather than Caílte the principal character. Douglas Hyde has suggested that the text may preserve the lost beginning of Acallam na Senórach.
