= Finn and Gráinne =

Middle Irish mythological story

Finn and Gráinne is a short, probably Middle Irish anecdote of the Finn Cycle about Finn mac Cumaill and his wooing of and eventual divorce from Gráinne, daughter of King Cormac mac Airt.

== Date and provenance ==
The text is preserved uniquely in the Great Book of Lecan (RIA), ff. 181a, 2. Although the spelling has been modernised, the text is thought to be very much earlier than the 14th/15th century, when the manuscript was compiled. Meyer suggests that the text was originally written in 10th or even the 9th century, while Gerard Murphy posits a somewhat later date, in the 11th or 10th century.

== Synopsis ==
The story begins to relate how Finn úa Báiscni courts Gráinne, daughter of King Cormac mac Airt. Intending to shake off the warrior, whom she seriously dislikes, she comes up with a seemingly impossible demand as her bridal gift: "a couple of every wild animal that was in Ireland to be brought in one drove, until they were on the rampart of Tara". However, Cáilte the "swift-footed" (coslúath), Finn's loyal companion, carries out the task for Finn and so Cormac has to give his daughter Gráinne in marriage to Finn. Gráinne detests her husband and the marriage proves to be an unhappy disaster. One time when the Feast of Tara is celebrated, with all the men of Ireland and the fianna present, Cormac observes the sad expression on his daughter's face. She whispers to him how the hatred for her husband has made her physically ill, thickening her blood and swelling her sinews. Overhearing Cormac's reaction to the sad news, Finn becomes aware of Gráinne's plight and announces their separation. The text ends with a number of difficult legal roscada exchanged between Cormac and Finn on the subject of divorce.

A sequel to the story of Gráinne's divorce is Tochmarc Ailbe ("The Wooing of Ailbe"), in which Finn comes to an arrangement with Cormac to marry one of his other daughters and chooses Ailbe.

== Sources ==
- Corthals, Johan. "Die Trennung von Finn und Gráinne." Zeitschrift für celtische Philologie 49-50 (1997): 71–91.
- Meyer, Kuno (intro, ed. and tr.). Fíanaigecht, being a Collection of Hitherto Unedited Irish Poems and Tales Relating to Finn and his Fiana, with an English Translation. Todd Lecture Series 16. Dublin: Dublin Institute for Advanced Studies, 1910.
- Meyer, Kuno (ed. and tr.). "Finn and Grainne." Zeitschrift für celtische Philologie 1 (1897): 458–61. Edition and translation available from CELT.
- Murphy, Gerard. Duanaire Finn. 3 vols: vol. 3. Dublin, 1953.
