= Dancing on Dangerous Ground =

Irish dance show

Dancing on Dangerous Ground is an Irish dance show created by and starring Jean Butler and Colin Dunne. It premiered in London at the Theatre Royal Drury Lane in 1999. The show made its American debut in New York at Radio City Music Hall in 2000.

== Synopsis ==
The ensemble and the three main characters are introduced during the surreal prologue: Finn McCool (a non-dancing role played by Tony Kemp), high king of Ireland; Diarmuid (Colin Dunne), captain of the Fianna—Finn's army; and Grania (Jean Butler), Finn's betrothed. The scene fades away and the prologue breaks open into the Court of Finn McCool, where Diarmuid is displayed as the best soldier at court and Finn's devoted and trusted servant. Soon afterwards Grania arrives and is introduced to her fiancé for the first time. Finn welcomes her and presents her with four bodyguards sworn to protect her.

Life at court continues as usual, Diarmuid and Grania unaware of each other. Diarmuid continues to drill the Fianna and Grania hosts pre-wedding celebrations for the ladies of the court. The two eventually meet in a late-night bar and their fate is sealed.

The second act opens with the wedding of Grania and Finn. Diarmuid attends the celebrations and leaves distraught. Grania realizes that her happiness lies with Diarmuid. She and her handmaidens slip a powerful sedative into the wine, drugging Finn and his soldiers. Diarmuid returns and discovers Grania over the unconscious Finn. The two escape the palace for the temporary safety of the wilderness.

The Fianna awaken from their stupor, bound and weak-kneed. They break free and an enraged Finn calls upon them and the women of the court to seek out the lovers. They comb the forest furiously and in the ensuing frenzy Diarmuid and Grania are separated. Finn's legion surrounds Diarmuid and kills him. Grania returns to the forest and finds the body of her beloved. Unable to cope with the loss of Diarmuid, she withers in despair. She awakens and finds herself in the company of the ghostly figures from the prologue. Diarmuid is among them and the two are reunited.

== Departure from the original story ==
The story is based on the Fenian tale The Pursuit of Diarmuid and Gráinne (the original spelling of "Grania"), but many important details have been changed. Most importantly, the Fianna doesn't kill Diarmuid in the original version. Gráinne's father, Cormac, intercedes on her behalf and offers Fionn his other daughter in exchange for Gráinne's freedom. Fionn accepts the offer and gives up his pursuit of Diarmuid and Gráinne.

== Critical reception ==
The show was not well received when it opened in London. It was dismissed as another Irish dance show in the Riverdance vein and critics felt it did not live up to its claim of dramatic storytelling through Irish dance. Changes were made to the order and execution of the dance numbers before the show opened in New York, where it received highly favorable reviews.

Despite the good press and advance sales for the Canadian premiere in Toronto, the show was unable to continue touring due to debts generated in London.
