= Cath Gabhra =

Mythical battle in Irish legend

Cath Gabhra (English: The Battle of Gabhair or Gowra) is a narrative of the Fenian Cycle of Irish mythology. It tells of the destruction of the fianna and the deaths of most of its warriors in a battle against the forces of High King Cairbre Lifechair. It is notable for depicting the fianna, the heroes of the cycle, in a negative light.

Cath Gabhra exists in many versions, and is referenced often in other works, including poems about Cairbre Lifechair in the Book of Leinster and in the long narrative Acallam na Senórach. Cairbre's daughter Sgiam Sholais is betrothed to Maolsheachlainn, prince of the Déisi, whose father Oengus has been killed by Cairbre's sons Fíacha Sroiptine and Eochaid Doimlen. However, the fianna and Fionn mac Cumhaill demand a large tribute for the marriage, and Cairbre decides their power has corrupted them. He raises a vast army from Ulster, Leinster, and Connacht, which is joined by the faction of the fianna loyal to Fionn's enemy Goll mac Morna. Fionn and the fianna are aided by the men of Munster and the Déisi. Cairbre starts the final battle by killing Fionn's servant Ferdia, and the armies meet at Gabhair for the final confrontation. The fianna's greatest warrior, Fionn's grandson Oscar (the son of Oisín), slays Cairbre, but dies of his wounds, thereby sealing the fianna's fate. In some versions, Fionn himself is slain by Aichlech while he weeps over the death of his grandson. Cairbre's forces ultimately triumph, and the only survivors of the fianna are Oisín and Caílte mac Rónáin, who live long enough to recount their tale to Saint Patrick two centuries later, according to Acallam na Senórach.

The location of the battle varies from text to text. Gabhra is generally considered identical to the modern Garristown, County Dublin, but other texts place it in Glenn Gabhra, situated between the hills of Tara and Skryne, County Meath. Some chronicles give the date of battle as 284.
