= Acallam na Senórach =

Middle Irish narrative cycle

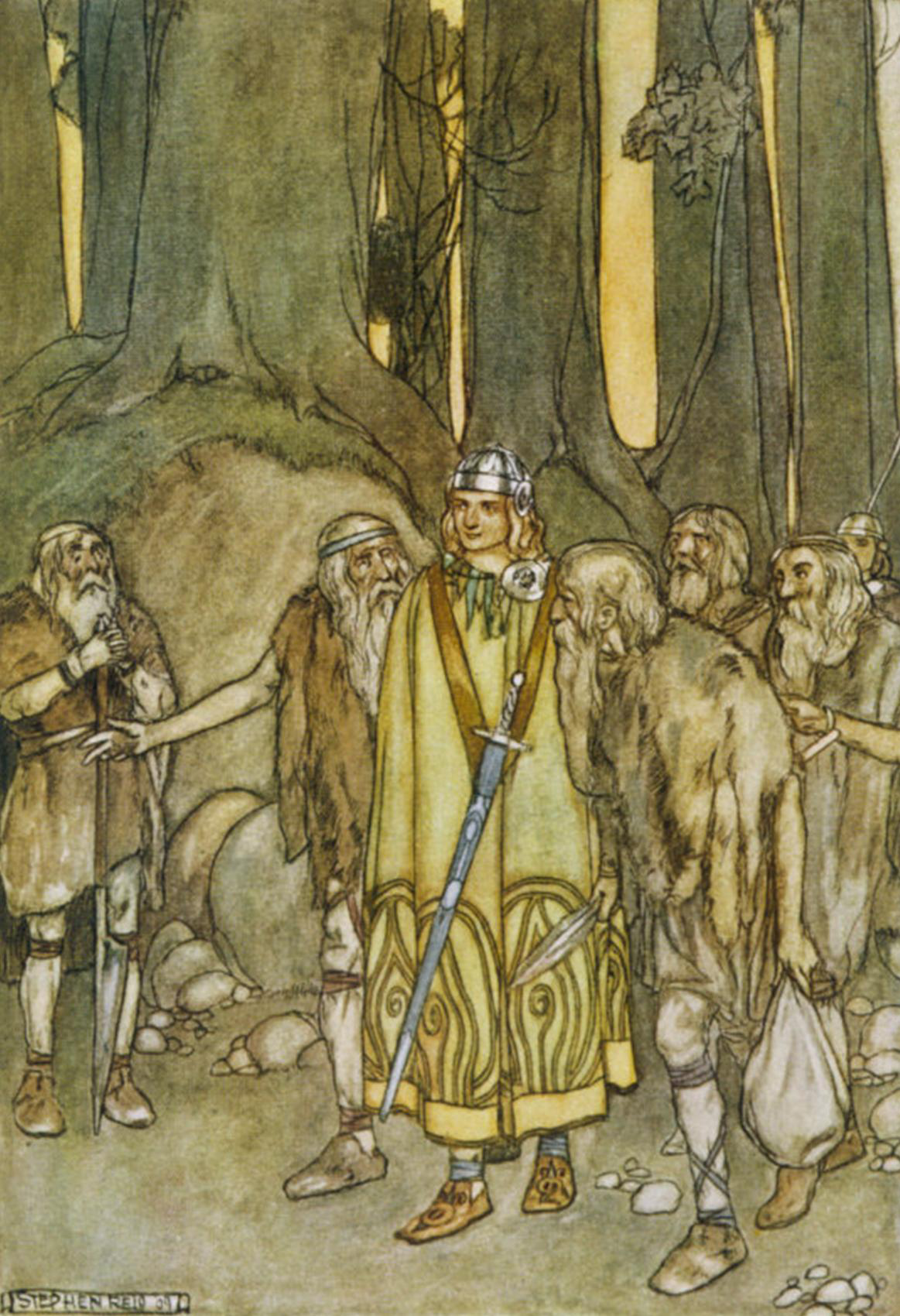
Fionn mac Cumhaill and the fianna

Acallam na Senórach (Modern Irish: Agallamh na Seanórach, whose title in English has been given variously as Colloquy of the Ancients, Tales of the Elders of Ireland, The Dialogue of the Ancients of Ireland, etc.), is an important prosimetric Middle Irish narrative dating to c. 1200. It is the most important text of the Finn Cycle (also known as the Fenian Cycle, fíanaigecht, fiannaigheacht, fiannaíocht etc) and at about 8,000 lines is the longest surviving work of medieval Irish literature. It contains many Finn Cycle narratives framed by a story in which the fianna warriors and Caílte mac Rónáin have survived long enough to relate the tales to Saint Patrick. The work has been seen as a defence of the Irish literary establishment when it came under the scrutiny of Church reformers during the 12th to 13th centuries.

== Contents ==
Set several hundred years after the death of Finn mac Cumhaill, the frame story follows two aged Irish heroes as they travel Ireland with a newly arrived Saint Patrick. The pagans are Caílte mac Rónáin, Finn's nephew, and Oisín, Finn's son, both members of the famous warrior band, the fianna. For most of the narrative Caílte is the more important informant of the two, regaling Patrick with tales of Finn and his men and explaining place names they encounter in the manner of dindsenchas narratives. Many of the allusions made within the text are in relation to Finn mac Cumaill.

The stories reiterate the greatness of Finn and his departed age of heroes, often focusing on the rivalry between Finn's family and that of his enemy Goll mac Morna, which threatened the stability of the island. Other stories record the Fianna's relationship with the Otherworld and the Tuatha Dé Danann, while those involving Patrick often stress the importance of integrating the values and culture of pre-Christian Ireland with the new ways of the Church. Some of the individual tales may predate their inclusion in Acallam na Senórach, though the authors adapted them with an eye towards narrative unity. Many of the tales within Acallam na Senórach are told through lore and the passing down of traditional stories.

== Editions and translations ==
Acallam na Senórach survives in five late manuscripts. Three are from the 15th century: manuscript Laud Misc. 610, manuscript Rawlinson B 487 (both held at the Bodleian Library, in Oxford), and the Book of Lismore. The fourth is OFM-A4, held at the University College in Dublin (what Stokes called the Franciscan manuscript, formerly kept at Killiney), which dates to the 16th century. (Note: Stokes refers to the fourth copy as one owned by Franciscans in the Merchant's Quay, Dublin.) The fifth witness is a copy of OFM-A4, namely OFM-A20(a) (University College, Dublin).

The work was edited, with an accompanying English translation entitled Colloquy with the Ancients by Standish O'Grady (1892), using the Book of Lismore version as the base text.

Whitley Stokes later printed an edition of Acallamh na Seanórach in Irische Texte IV, using the Laud Misc. 610 as base and drawing on Rawlinson B. 487, Book of Lismore, and OFM-A4. Stokes also provided a partial translation of the work to complement O'Grady's translation, filling the lacunae in the Book of Lismore.

The first complete English translation was that of Ann Dooley and Harry Roe, Tales of the Elders of Ireland, published by Oxford University Press in 1999. The translation provides information of how the tale offers many subtle references to the political scene of the era of the tale. This translation also informs the readers that St. Patrick is an allegory for the impact of Christian faith on Irish culture. Maurice Harmon (2009) published another translation, entitled The Dialogue of the Ancients of Ireland.

Other related Acallam texts are:

1) Agallamh na Senórach, or the 'Reeves Agallamh' (RIA MS 24 P 5 (93), the only extant copy formerly owned by Bishop Reeves. This is "[a] different Agallamh from any that were hitherto known" according to Douglas Hyde (1920). It was edited by Nessa Ní Shéaghdha, 1942-45 in 3 vols. There is currently no published English translation.

2) Acallam Bec, or the 'Small Acallam'. This is preserved in the fifteenth-century Book of Lismore only. A partial edition was done by Douglas Hyde.

== Adaptations ==
Composer Tarik O'Regan has adapted the narrative into a one-hour musical setting for solo guitar and chorus, performed under the title Acallam na Senórach. The work was premiered on 23 November 2010 in Dublin by the National Chamber Choir of Ireland and Stewart French (guitar) under the direction of Paul Hillier. The musical is made up of two parts which include a Prologue, Epilogue, and guitar interludes.
