= Tír na nÓg =

Otherworld realm in Irish mythology

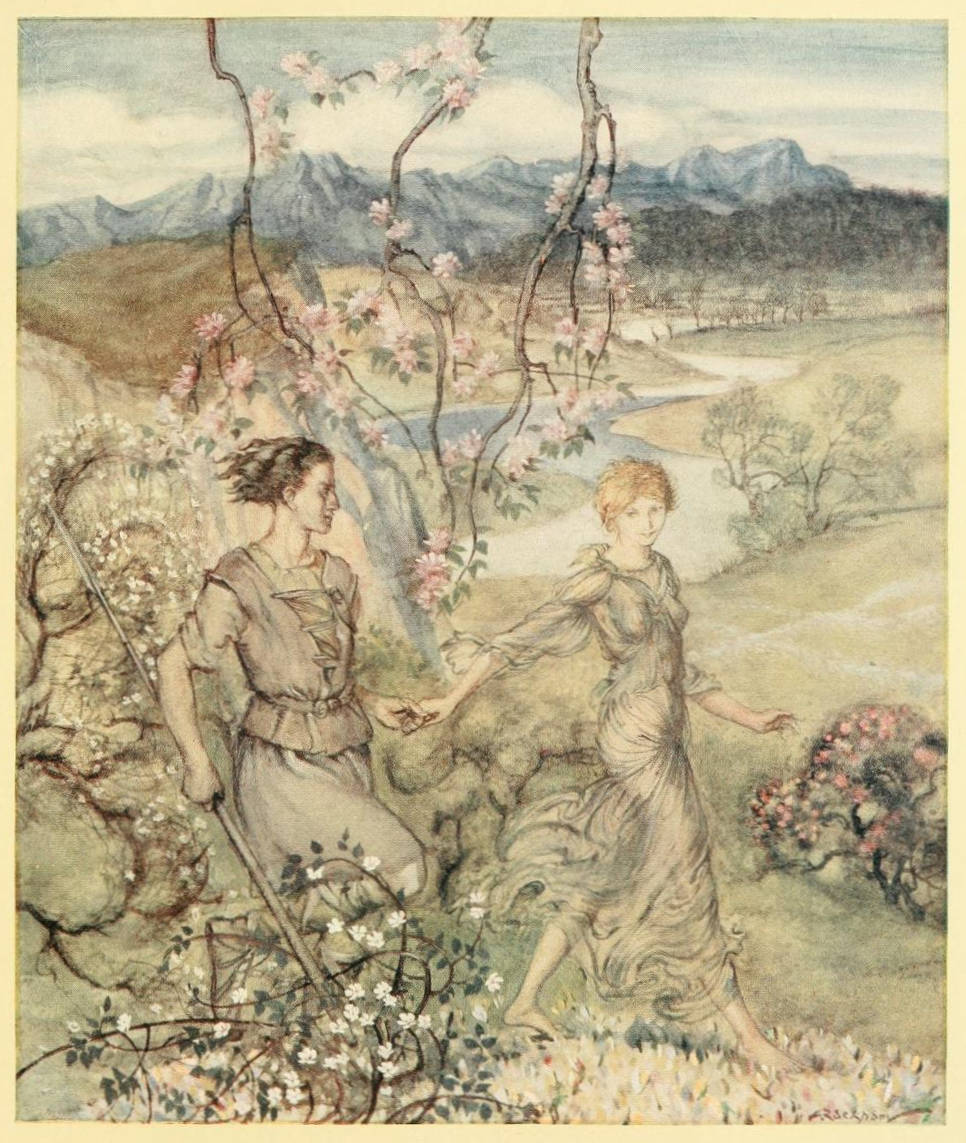
The 'Land of the Ever Young' depicted by Arthur Rackham in Irish Fairy Tales (1920).

In Irish mythology, Tír na nÓg (/ˌtɪərnæˈnoʊɡ/ TEER-nan-OHG, Irish: [ˌtʲiːɾʲ n̪ˠə ˈn̪ˠoːɡ]; lit. 'Land of the Young') or Tír na hÓige ('Land of Youth') is one of the names for the Celtic Otherworld. Tír na nÓg is best known from the tale of Oisín (Irish pronunciation: [ˈɔʃiːnʲ, ɔˈʃiːnʲ]) and Niamh (Irish pronunciation: [n̠ʲiəw]).

In Scottish Gaelic it is spelt Tìr nan Òg ([ˌtʲʰiːɾʲ nən̪ˠ ˈɔːk]) and in Manx, Cheer nyn Aeg.

== Description, themes, and symbolism ==
Tír na nÓg is depicted as an island paradise and supernatural realm of everlasting youth, beauty, health, abundance and joy. Its inhabitants are described as the Tuatha Dé Danann or the warriors of the Tuatha Dé, the gods of pre-Christian Ireland, who engage in poetry, music, entertainment, and the feast of Goibniu, which grants immortality to the participants. In the echtrae (adventure) and immram (voyage) tales, various Irish mythical heroes visit Tír na nÓg after a voyage or an invitation from one of its residents. They reach it by entering ancient burial mounds or caves, by journeying through a mist, by going under water, or by travelling across the sea for three days on an enchanted boat or Manannán's horse. The tales of mortals who visit the Otherworld are referred to as echtrai (adventures) and baili (visions, ecstasies). The path across the sea is called Mag Mell (Plain of Honey). It is the golden path made by the sun on the ocean and to travel, "far over the green meadows of the waters where the horses of Lir have their pastures."

The god that rules this region in the surviving tales is almost always named as Manannán mac Lir.

Other Old Irish names for the Otherworld include Tír Tairngire ('Land of Promise'/'Promised Land'), Tír fo Thuinn ('Land under the Wave'), Mag Mell ('Plain of Delight'/'Delightful Plain'), Ildathach ('Multicoloured Place'), and Emain Ablach ('Isle of Apple Trees').

== Literary appearances ==
=== Oisín and Niamh ===
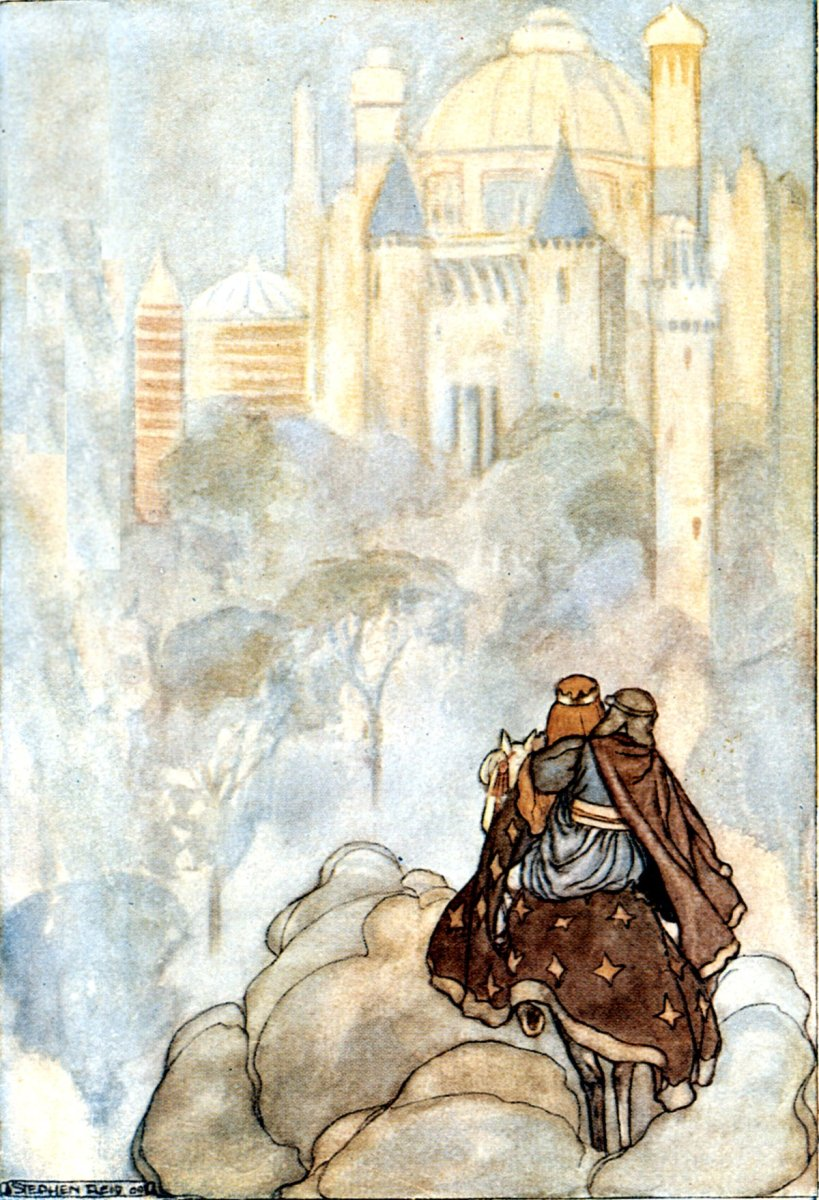
Oisín and Niamh travelling to Tír na nÓg, illustration by Stephen Reid in T. W. Rolleston's The High Deeds of Finn (1910)

In the tale, Oisín, a member of the mythical Irish warrior giants called Na Finna, and Niamh, a woman of the Otherworld, fall in love. She brings him to Tír na nÓg on a magical horse that can travel over water. After spending what seems to be three years there, Oisín becomes homesick and wants to return to Ireland. Niamh reluctantly lets him return on the magical horse, but warns him never to touch the ground. When he returns, he finds that 300 years have passed in Ireland. Oisín falls from the horse, while helping a group of old men trying to move a large rock or boulder. He instantly becomes elderly, as the years catch up with him, and he quickly dies of old age and turns into dust.

The story of Oisín and Niamh bears a striking similarity to many other tales, e.g. the Japanese tale of Urashima Tarō. Another version concerns King Herla, a legendary king of the ancient Britons, who visited the Otherworld, only to return some 200 years later after the lands had been settled by Anglo-Saxons. The "Seven Sleepers of Ephesus", a group of Christian youths who hid in a cave outside the city of Ephesus around 250, purportedly awoke about 180 years later during the reign of Theodosius II.

=== Oisín in Tír na nÓg ===
There is a king of Tír na nÓg who held the crown for many years. The tradition of the land is that every seven years champions come to run against the king in order to rule. They run up a hill to a throne and the first person to sit on the throne becomes king until a champion replaces him. The king begins to fear that someone else will replace him as king. He visits a Druid and asks about his fate as a monarch. The Druid tells him that he will always be king unless his son-in-law runs against him. Since the king's daughter is not yet married he decides to use the Druid's magic to turn his daughter's head into that of a pig. The Druid then tells the king's daughter that she will get her own head back if she marries a son of Fionn mac Cumhaill. The king's daughter finds one of the sons, Oisín, and tells him what the Druid told her. They marry and she transforms back into herself. They then go back to Tír na nÓg and Oisín enters the challenge for the throne. He wins the throne and no one ever runs against him again.

Kings are given a pig's head and pigs are a common symbol in Irish mythology. For the culture they were a vital meat source and they were smaller and fiercer than the modern domesticated pig. Early in Celtic culture, the pig was used as a funeral animal and pigs were an important aspect of trade between the Celts and Romans. They also represent a connection to the warrior class and are said to be good luck to the person who catches them.

=== Cormac's adventure in the Land of Promise ===
A grey-haired warrior visits King Cormac mac Airt carrying a silver branch with three golden apples that creates a soothing music. The warrior, later revealed to be Manannán mac Lir, is described as wearing a purple fringed mantle, a golden ribbed shirt, and white bronze shoes or sandals. When Cormac asks from what land Manannán has come, he responds that he comes from a land where there is no age or decay, falsehood, sadness, gloom, hatred, envy, or haughtiness. Cormac asks to make an alliance, and when Manannán agrees, he demands the branch, which Manannán gives him in exchange for three favours. Those favours later turn out to be Cormac's daughter, his son, and his wife.

After Cormac's wife is taken, he follows her abductor, and is magically transported to a land in a heavy mist. The land is described as a vast plain containing two fortresses. The first fortress consists of a bronze wall with a white silver house thatched in white bird's wings; there are horsemen stationed there and a man is constantly burning an oak fire. The other fortress consists of four silver houses thatched in white bird's wings with a bronze wall surrounding it. He enters the fortress and finds a palace made with bronze beams and silver wattle. Also in the fortress there is a shining fountain with five streams running from it; the fountain is surrounded by the nine purple hazels of Buan (an Ulster goddess). The hazels drop their nuts into the fountains where five salmon eat them and send their husks down the five streams. The residents of the palace drink water from the fountain, and the sound of the cascading water is more melodious than any music known to man.

When Cormac enters the palace, he meets a couple – the warrior who has stolen his wife and a beautiful yellow-haired woman wearing a golden helmet, whose feet are being warmed or washed without anyone else being present. This time the warrior is described as having a beautiful shape, a comely form, and a wondrous countenance. A cook enters the palace with a log, an axe, and a pig, and begins to prepare a meal in a cauldron. Manannán tells the cook to turn the pig, but the cook responds that the pig will not cook until four truths have been told.

The cook tells his tale first, recounting that he once stole cattle from a man, and when the man asked him to return them, he did so in exchange for the pig, the axe, and the wood he now carries; he has been cooking the same pig ever since. Then the warrior tells a tale of harvesting wheat, indicating that when the people of his land wished to plow, plant, and harvest the wheat, each step had been completed as soon as they desired it, and that they have been eating from that harvest ever since. The woman in the gold helmet then tells her story, saying that she has seven cows and seven sheep, and that the milk and wool they produce is enough for all the people in the Land of Promise. Then Cormac is asked to tell his truth, so he recounts his story with the silver branch up to the present. With the four truths told, the pig is ready and Cormac is served a portion.

Cormac says he cannot eat without fifty men in his presence, so the warrior sings a song that puts Cormac to sleep and when he re-awakens, he finds fifty warriors along with his daughter, son, and wife. Then the warrior places an enchanted cup of intricate and unusual workmanship and tells Cormac that when three falsehoods are spoken it will break into three pieces and then when three truths are told, it can mend itself whole. The warrior then tells Cormac that his true name is Manannán son of Ler, and that his whole purpose was to bring him to the Land of Promise, but that after Cormac's death, all that he has returned to Cormac (his son, daughter, wife, and cup) will be returned to the Land of Promise.

Manannán then explains what Cormac has witnessed. The horsemen at the first fortress are the “men of art” in Ireland who collect cattle and wealth that pass away into nothing. The man collecting and burning the oak wood is a young lord who pays for everything he consumes. The Fountain is the Fountain of Knowledge, and the five streams are the senses through which knowledge is obtained, and that no one has knowledge who does not drink from the fountain or its streams. Finally, as like the salmon, were the people Cormac saw at the Fountain of Knowledge.

=== The pursuit of the Gilla Decair and his horse ===
In the story of the Gilla Decair and His Horse, the Fianna follow the Gilla across the sea to retrieve fifteen of their number who were taken to the Gilla's island on the back of his gigantic horse. Finn leads the Fianna to Ben-Edair, where the Tuatha Dé Danann made a solemn oath to the Gaels that if they are ever in a time of need to leave Ireland, ships will be provided. There, they encounter two heroic brothers, who offer to serve Finn for a year and create a fleet of ships for transporting the Fianna across the sea. Finn and the remaining Fianna travel for three days until they spot an island with a sheer cliff and cylindrical rock perched atop it, where they pick up the Gilla's track. Dermot is then selected to scale the cliff (more slippery than an eel) because of his cowardly behavior and because he was raised on the Isle of Promise by Manannán and also taught by the Dagda's son Angus Og. Embarrassed by the scathing words of Fergus Truelips, Dermot grabs the two staves of Manannán and vaults onto the cliff.

Once on the island, Dermot encounters a vast tract of dense forest where he is surrounded by the melodious sound of streams, wind, birds, and bees. In the midst of the forest, he crosses a plain and spots an immense tree with interlacing branches. Beside the tree is a stone well topped by a pointed drinking horn. The water is pure, so Dermot stoops to drink it, and no sooner does he do so, that the thought enters his head that no one should drink from the fountain, and a loud rumbling noise approaches him. When Dermot looks up, he encounters a wizard, who castigates Dermot for roaming through his forest and drinking his pure water. The two men come to blows and fight until dusk, when the wizard dives into the well. Dermot kills and eats a deer that evening, and when he awakes the next morning, the Dermot finds the wizard waiting for him; he upbraids Dermot for eating his deer, then the same episode from the previous day occurs (fighting until dusk when the wizard disappears into the well). On the third day, Dermot grabs onto the wizard when he leaps into the well, and finds himself on the other side.

Dermot finds himself in a beautiful and flowery plane facing a regal city. He chases after the wizard through a multitude of people until he crosses through the city gate, and there, the gates close behind him, and he is attacked by the people of the city. He fights fiercely until his assailants flee further into the city and out into the forest, leaving Dermot broken in a pool of his own blood. A burly wizard then approaches Dermot and kicks him in the side. The burly wizard tells Dermot that he is in a dangerous place but will transport him to another location where he will sleep much better. The wizard takes Dermot on a long journey to another fortress, where Dermot is greeted by 150 men and their ladies as well as the lady of the fortress, who all greet him by name. At the wizard's fortress, Dermot is placed in an infirmary and completely healed with salves of herbs. Once healed, he engages with the company in feasting, drinking, and intelligent entertainment each night. After three nights, Dermot asks his host in what land he is, and who is in charge of it. The burly wizard tells Dermot he is in Tir fo thuinn and that the man with whom he battled is the Wizard of the Well who is the king of the land with whom he himself, the Wizard of Chivalry has a blood feud.

Growing tired of waiting for Dermot, Finn and the Fianna scale the cliff, and on the same plane encounter a horseman who kisses Finn three times and asks the men to follow him to his fortress. There, the Fianna encounter an army and a well-armed keep and are entertained with feasting for three nights. After three days Finn asks about the land and its ruler and is told that he is in the land of Sorcha, and that his host is the king of that land. A female messenger then comes to the King of Sorcha and tells him that his island is being invaded by the Greeks. The Fianna and the King of Sorcha then sally out to meet the Greeks and slaughter them in great carnage.

The King of Greece has a beautiful daughter who steals off to be with Finn. This upsets the Greek King more than the loss of his men, and declares that whoever can retrieve her will be given many precious things. A captain from his company explains that he has a magic branch that when waved releases beautiful music that will put people to sleep and promises to retrieve the King's daughter. He does so, and the Greeks return to Athens.

The company splits up and some go to Greece to retrieve the King's daughter, while others meet the King of the Island, the Wizard of the Well, whose name is revealed to be Abartach son of Allchad. When confronted by the Fianna, Abartach asks Finn what he is owed, to which Finn requests single combat. Abartach indicates it is not in his interest to fight Finn, and requests what his wronged Fianna would like. Conán declares he wants fourteen women and Abartach's own wife to ride his horse back to Ireland. Abartach assents to this. The Fianna return to Ireland and have a wedding feast.

Comparative mythologist Alexander Haggerty Krappe suggested that the "Gilla" character, a "horrible giant" who owned a demonic horse, was the ruler of the Otherworld realm of Tir fa Thuinn and was the "Celtic" Hades.

== See also ==
- Nanog, the gene involved in the self-renewal ability and pluripotency maintenance of embryonic stem cells, is named after Tír na nÓg.
- Baby Follies, children's animated series dubbed into Irish as Tír na hÓige
- English post-rock band Maruja released an improvised EP called Tir na nÓg in 2025, inspired by Irish mythology.
