= Fíacha Sroiptine =

Legendary king of Ireland

Fiacha Sraibhtine, son of Cairbre Lifechair, was, according to medieval Irish legend and historical tradition, a High King of Ireland. On his father's death, Fothad Cairpthech and Fothad Airgthech, sons of Lugaid mac Con, had taken the throne jointly, but within the year Fothad Airgthech killed his brother. Fíacha and the fianna then defeated and killed Fothad in the Battle of Ollarba.

Fíacha's son, Muiredach Tirech, commanded his armies, as the king himself was not allowed to go into battle. Once, Muiredach led a victorious expedition to Munster. The Three Collas—Colla Uais, Colla Fo Chri and Colla Menn, sons of Fíacha's brother Eochaid Doimlén—gave battle to Fíacha while Muiredach and his army were still in Munster. Fíacha's druid, Dubchomar, prophesied that if Fíacha was to defeat the Collas, none of his descendants would ever rule Ireland, and likewise, if the Collas won, none of their descendants would be king after them. Fíacha was defeated and killed in what became known as the Battle of Dubchomar.

Fíacha had ruled for 31, 33, 36 or 37 years. The chronology of Geoffrey Keating's Foras Feasa ar Éirinn dates his reign to 273–306, the Annals of the Four Masters to 285–322.

== Family tree ==
Cormac mac Airt	Eithne Ollamda	Fionn mac Cumhaill
Cairbre Lifechair	Aine
Fíacha Sroiptine	Eochaid Doimlén
Muiredach Tirech	Colla Uais	Colla Fo Chrí	Colla Menn
Eochaid Mugmedón
Uí Néill	Connachta

Preceded by Fothad Cairpthech and Fothad Airgthech	High King of Ireland; FFE 273–306; AFM 285–322	Succeeded by Colla Uais
