= Eochaid Gonnat =

High King of Ireland

Eochaid Gonnat or Gunnat ("wounding"?), son of Fiach, son of Imchad, son of Bresal, son of Sírchad, son of Fíatach Finn, was, according to medieval Irish legend and historical tradition, a High King of Ireland. He came to the throne on the death of Cormac mac Airt. He ruled for a year, before falling in battle. Sources differ as to his killer: he was either Lugaid mac Lugna, Lugaid Menn son of Óengus, or Lugna Feirtre. He was succeeded by Cormac's son Cairbre Lifechair. The chronology of Geoffrey Keating's Foras Feasa ar Éirinn dates his reign to 244–245, the Annals of the Four Masters to 266–267.

Preceded by Cormac mac Airt	High King of Ireland; FFE 244–245; AFM 266–267	Succeeded by Cairbre Lifechair
