= Ann Dooley =

Canadian academic

Ann Dooley is a professor emerita with the Centre for Medieval Studies and the Celtic Studies Program at St. Michael's College at the University of Toronto where she specializes in Irish literature. She has published a translation of Acallam na Senórach entitled Tales of the Elders of Ireland as well as a study of Táin Bó Cuailnge entitled Playing the Hero: Reading the Irish Saga Táin Bó Cuailnge.

== Published works ==
- Dooley, Ann; and Roe, Harry (translators) (1999). Tales of the Elders of Ireland. Oxford. ISBN 0-19-283918-7
- Dooley, Ann. (2006). Playing the Hero: Reading the Irish Saga Táin Bó Cuailnge. Toronto. ISBN 978-0-8020-3832-6
