= Cara Butler =

American stepdancer and choreographer

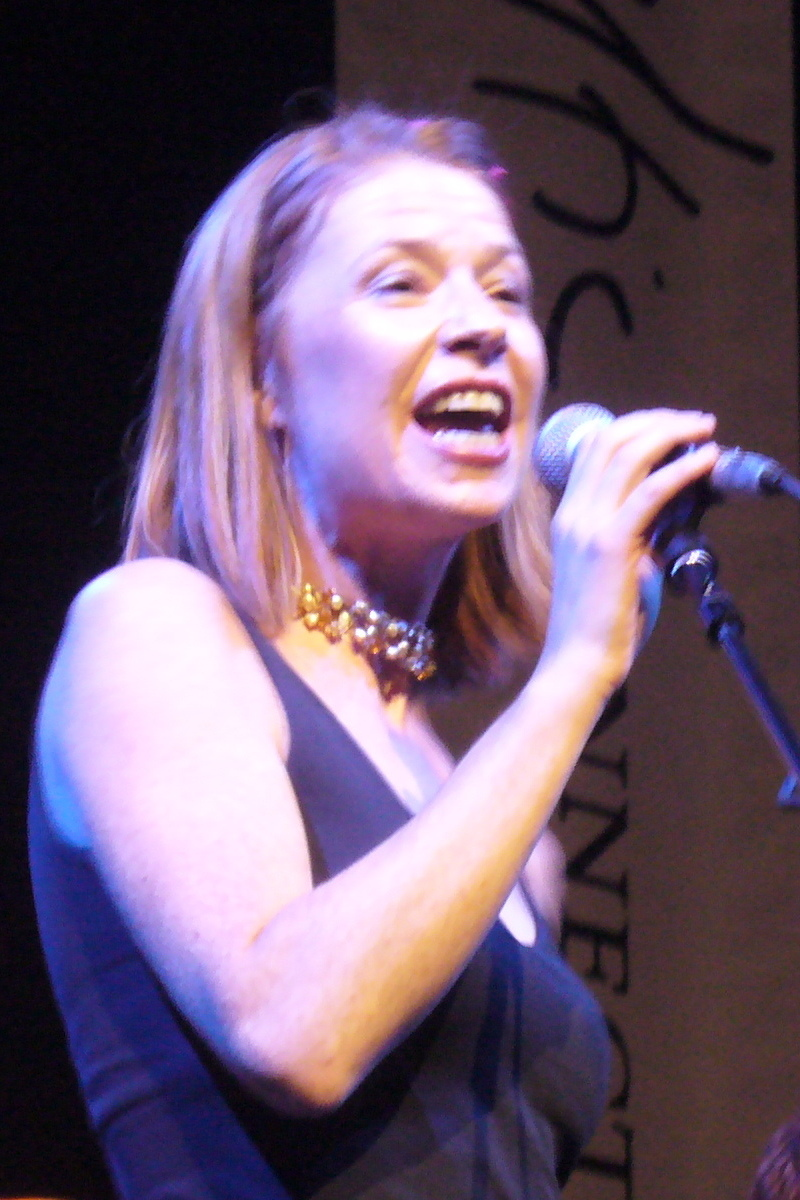
- Butler in 2010
- Born: United States
- Occupations: Dancer, choreographer
- Dancing career
- Dances: Irish stepdance

Cara Butler is an American stepdancer and choreographer. She is the younger sister of dancer Jean Butler.

== Dance career ==
Cara Butler toured with the Irish folk group The Chieftains since 1992, performing traditional and contemporary Irish dances.

She is the sister of Jean Butler, the original female lead in the theatre production Riverdance; in 2005, she was one of the dancers in her sister's instructional DVD, Irish Dance Masterclass with Jean Butler.

Butler was the lead dancer in a Folgers coffee commercial, "A Dancer's Morning".
