= The Three Collas =

Irish nobles in the 4th century

The Three Collas (Modern Irish: Trí Cholla) were, according to medieval Irish legend and historical tradition, the fourth-century sons of Eochaid Doimlén, son of Cairbre Lifechair. Their names were: Cairell Colla Uais; Muiredach Colla Fo Chrí (also spelt Colla da Chrioch, or Fochrich); and Áed Colla Menn. Colla Uais ruled as High King of Ireland for four years. Recent DNA analysis confirms the history of the Three Collas in fourth-century Ireland, but questions their descent from Eochaid Doimlén and Cairbre Lifechair.

== Legend ==
According to tradition, the Three Collas killed their uncle, Fíacha Sroiptine, at the Battle of Dubhchomar, in Crioch Rois, Breagh, with Colla Uais taking the kingship. It was prophesied that whoever killed them, his descendants would never rule Ireland. Colla Uais ruled in Fíacha's place for three years (323–326 AD), and as High-King of Ireland for four years, until Fiacha's son Muiredach Tirech banished the Three Collas, exiling them and three hundred followers to Alba (Scotland).

The mother of Three Collas was said to be Ailech, the daughter of Udhaire, king of Alba. According to Keating's version Udhaire put them in command of three hundred warriors. After that they returned to Ireland, hoping that Muiredach might kill them, and deprive his descendants of the throne. But Muiredach knew of the prophecy, and despite knowing they had killed his father, took them into his service.

After several years, Muiredach decided the Collas should have territory of their own, and sent them to conquer Ulster. With an army drawn from Connacht, they fought seven battles in a week against the Ulaid at Achaidh Leithdeircc, killing Fergus Foga, king of Ulster, in the seventh. Colla Menn also died in this battle. They burned Emain Macha, the Ulster capital, after which it was abandoned, and seized substantial territories in mid-Ulster, thought to be the origin of the kingdom of Airgíalla.

The chronology of Keating's Foras Feasa ar Éirinn dates Colla Uais' High Kingship to 306–310. The Annals of the Four Masters dates his High Kingship to 322–326, and his destruction of Emain Macha and conquest of Ulster to 331. However, the chronology of early Irish historical tradition is regarded by historians as artificial. One story makes Fiachra Cassán of the Airgíalla, son of Colla Fo Chrí, the foster-father of Cormac mac Airt, who according to the usual chronology was his own great great grandfather, and an alternative tradition dated the fall of Emain Macha to 450.

The sixth century female saint, Derchairthinn, associated with Oughter Ard near Straffan, County Kildare, was said to be "of the race of Colla Uais, Monarch of Érinn".

== Historical interpretation ==
According to a theory advanced by T. F. O'Rahilly, the traditional story of the Three Collas is not historical, although it has a basis in history. O'Rahilly argues that the breaking of the power of the Ulaid, the destruction of Emain Macha and the establishment of the kingdoms of the Airgialla were actually accomplished by the three sons of Niall Noígiallach, Conall, Endae and Eógan, who established the kingdoms of Tir Eógan and Tir Conaill in north-western Ulster in the mid-5th century. He believes the Three Collas are literary doublets of the three sons of Niall, their story a genealogical fiction intended to give the tributary kingdoms of the Airgialla a noble pedigree.

This theory is followed by more recent historians, including Francis J. Byrne, and Dáibhí Ó Cróinín.

Donald Schlegel claims the brothers' tripartite names to be the only examples in ancient Ireland of brothers using the Roman style naming convention of personal name followed by family name followed by an epithet. This may reflect their alleged "return" from exile in Alba, which at the traditional time of their story—the 4th-century—was part of the Roman Empire. Schlegel suggests that being put in command of 300 soldiers may have meant that were centurions in the Roman army.

Schlegel also argues that the Three Collas, along with their name "Colla", may have descended from the Trinovantes of Britain. He claims that Trinovantes mistranslated by Ollams into Irish could have produced the name Airgíalla, the name given to the territory the Three Collas conquered in Ulster. In regards to Colla, it may derive from the names Coill or Coel, both of which Geoffrey Keating mentioned in the area the Trinovantes lived, Camulodunum (modern-day Colchester).

== Family tree ==
Cairbre Lifechair	Aine	Udaire
Fíacha Sroiptine	Eochaid Doimlén	Ailech
Muiredach Tirech	Colla Uais	Colla Fó Chrí	Colla Menn
Eochaid Mugmedón	Fiachra Cassán
Airgíalla
Uí Néill	Connachta	*	Uí Maine

Note: This family tree does not reflect the fact the DNA data of Colla descendants does not match that of Eochaid Mugmedón descendants, namely those of Niall of the Nine Hostages who bear the widely-distributed M222 mutation.

== DNA analysis ==
In 2007, Josiah McGuire discovered that male DNA testers with surnames historically associated with the Three Collas in ancient pedigrees had the same Y-chromosome DNA. This Y-DNA is passed down from father to son like surnames. Included among the surnames were McDonald and McMahon. Six McDonald testers have traced their ancestry back to an ancient McDonald pedigree that goes back to Colla Uais. Two McMahon testers have traced their ancestry McMahon pedigree that goes back to Colla Crioch. In 2009, a public project was started at Family Tree DNA for testers who have Colla DNA. The testers with Colla DNA belong to a haplogroup named R-Z3008, a mutation that occurred very roughly around 450 AD. This differs from the R-M222 haplogroup of testers with surnames descended from the Uí Néill and the Connachta. The historical interpretation by Donald Schlegel is consistent with recent Y-DNA analysis.

In 2020, a study of 466 testers with Z3008 Y-DNA found that 232 have 20 surnames found in ancient Irish genealogies descended from the Three Collas. The 232 testers are composed of 53 McDonald, 43 McMahon, 23 McKenna, 17 MacCan, 17 Duffy, 12 McGuire, 8 Hughes, 8 McQuillan, 8 Monaghan, 7 Boylan, 5 Hart, 5 Kelly, 4 Higgins, 4 McArdle, 4 MacDougall, 3 Carroll, 3 Cooley, 3 Larkin, 3 Neal, 2 Devine.

Preceded by Fíacha Sroiptine	High King of Ireland; FFE 306–310; AFM 322–326	Succeeded by Muiredach Tirech
