= Gráinne =

Figure in Irish mythology

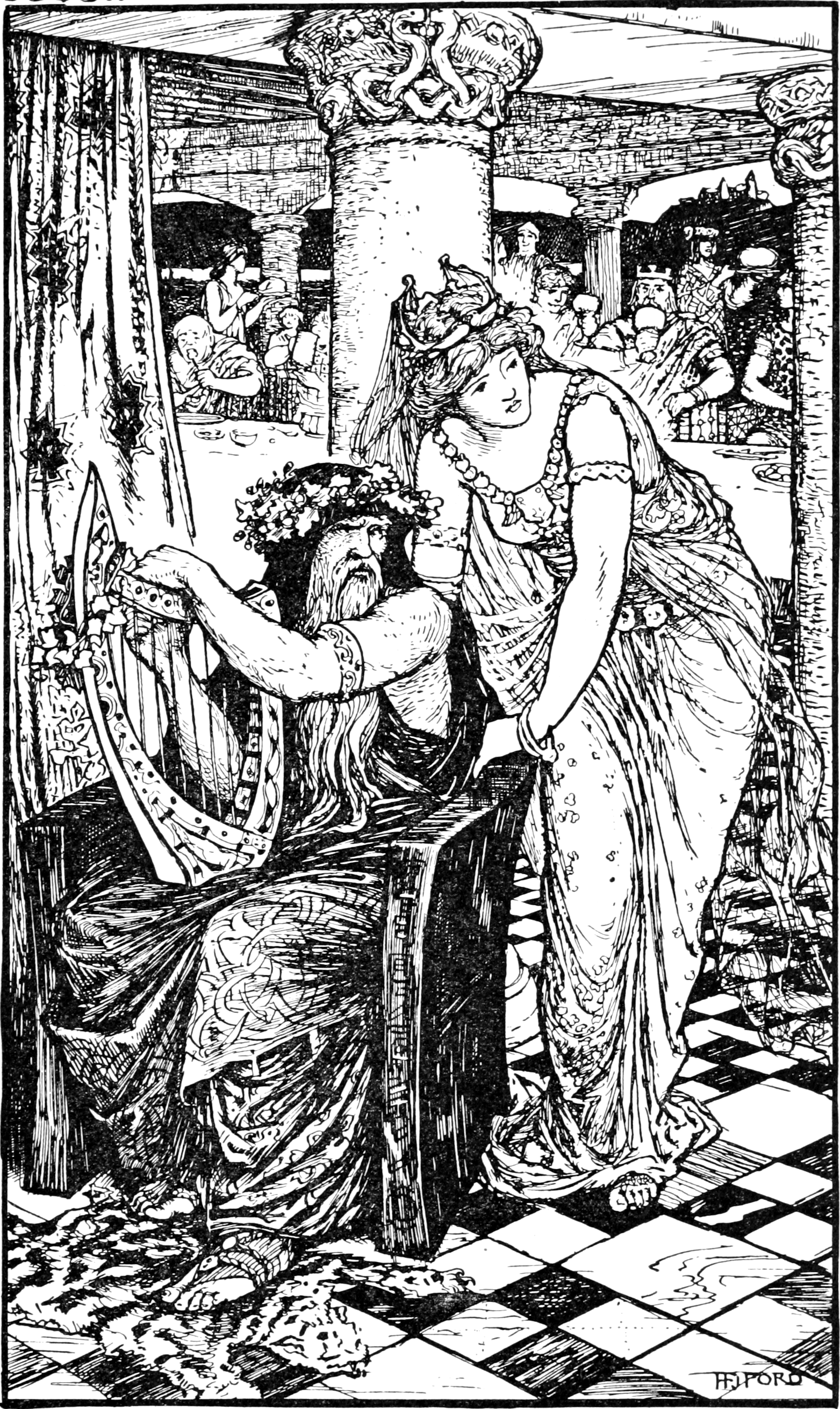
"Grania questions the druid", illustration by Henry Justice Ford in The Book of Romance (1903)

Gráinne (Irish pronunciation: [ˈɡɾˠaːn̠ʲə]), sometimes anglicised Grania, is the daughter of king Cormac mac Airt in the Fianna Cycle of Irish mythology. She is one of the central figures in the Middle Irish text Finn and Gráinne, as well as the 17th-century tale The Pursuit of Diarmuid and Gráinne, which tells of her betrothal to Fionn mac Cumhaill, leader of the Fianna, and her subsequent elopement with Fionn's warrior Diarmuid Ua Duibhne.

== History ==
In The Pursuit of Diarmuid and Gráinne, Gráinne was promised in marriage to Fionn but, repulsed by his age, she forms a relationship with Diarmuid at their betrothal party. At first he refuses out of loyalty to Fionn but she places a geis upon him to run away with her. Their long flight from Fionn is aided by Diarmuid's foster-father Aengus Óg. Eventually, Fionn pardons Diarmuid after Aengus intercedes on their behalf; the pair settle in Kerry and produce five children. Years later Diarmuid is wounded by a boar while hunting with Fionn, who stalls in healing him until it is too late; texts vary on Gráinne's subsequent actions. In some versions, she mourns her husband until she dies herself; in others, she swears her sons to avenge their father's death on Fionn. In still others, she forgives Fionn or even marries him.

According to the historian Peter Berresford Ellis, "[Fionn Mac Cumhail] had many loves during his career but none is better known than his unrequited love for Gráinne. He was elderly when [the High King] Cormac Mac Art gave his daughter Gráinne to him in marriage. But before the ceremony, Gráinne eloped with one of Fionn’s warriors, Diarmuid Ua Duibhne. ‘The Pursuit of Diarmuid and Gráinne’ is one of the classic love tales and a major epic of the Fenian Cycle." Ellis goes on to say: "Gráinne’s character is always drawn with consistency in the myths. She is a shallow person, wilful, ruthless and passionate, and what in modern terms would be described as a neurotic."

The story of Gráinne and Diarmuid is one of a number of instances in Irish mythology of a love triangle between a young man, a young woman and an aging suitor, the other most famous instance being between Naoise, Deirdre and Conchobar mac Nessa in the Ulster Cycle. The same theme also shows up in other cultures, notably in the Arthurian legend. The Pursuit of Diarmuid and Gráinne shares a number of similarities with the story of Tristan and Iseult, and to a certain extent the love affair of Lancelot and Guinevere.

The LÉ Gráinne (CM10), a former vessel in the Irish Naval Service, was named after Gráinne.

In the 1999 Irish dance show Dancing on Dangerous Ground Gráinne is played by former Riverdance star Jean Butler.

Rath Gráinne at the Hill of Tara in Ireland is named after her.
