= Jean Butler =

American dancer, choreographer (born 1971)

- Born: March 14, 1971 (age 55); Mineola, New York, US
- Occupations: Irish dancer, choreographer, and actress
- Years active: 1994–2010
- Spouse: Cuan Hanly (m. 2001)
- Dancing career
- Former groups: Donny Golden School of Irish Dance, Riverdance
- Dances: Irish dancing

Jean Butler (born March 14, 1971) is an American stepdancer, Irish dancer, choreographer, and actress. She is best known for originating the principal female role in the Irish dance theatrical production Riverdance.

== Early life ==
Butler was born in Mineola, New York. Her brother and sister were also born on Long Island. She started ballet and tap classes at the age of four. She eventually quit both. She began Irish dance lessons at the age of six, which she quit promptly. "I hated it," she says. "They made me stand with my arms at my sides for two hours. So, I left. I was too young." She tried Irish dance again at age nine, this time with a different dance teacher, Donny Golden, whom she considers to be one of the most influential people in her life. About a year into Irish dance, she became very serious with it and quit the soccer and baseball teams. From a young age, she competed in regional, national and international championships. Butler won numerous national titles and regional titles, and placed well in international competitions. Butler attended Hofstra University and earned an Honours Degree in Theatre and Drama from the University of Birmingham.

== Career ==
Butler has performed with Green Fields of America and Cherish the Ladies. She debuted with The Chieftains at Carnegie Hall at the age of seventeen, and toured with them on three continents. In England, Butler met Irish dancer Colin Dunne and they performed together in Mayo 5000 in 1993.

=== Riverdance and Dancing on Dangerous Ground ===
In 1994, under the invitation of producer Moya Doherty, she performed in a seven-minute intermission piece at the Eurovision Song Contest 1994 entitled Riverdance. The piece was co-choreographed by Butler with Michael Flatley. The response was so explosive that it was extended into a full show, starring Butler and Flatley. The show toured throughout 1995. After Flatley abruptly left the show over creative control disputes in October 1995, Butler was joined by long-time friend Colin Dunne. The pair were the lead dancers in the performance at the famous Radio City Music Hall in New York City that was filmed and put on DVD. After a long and extremely successful run with the show, Butler eventually left Riverdance in January 1997.

In 1998, following Dunne's departure from Riverdance, Butler once again collaborated with Dunne to create the show Dancing on Dangerous Ground, which was based on the ancient Irish legend of Diarmuid and Gráinne. It opened in London in 1999 to critical acclaim, and then in New York.

From 2003 to 2005, Butler was Artist In Residence at the University of Limerick's Irish World Music Centre.

=== Later career ===
She received a commission from the Irish Arts Council to create a solo work in 2004. In 2005 she released an instructional DVD, Irish Dance Masterclass With Jean Butler, which her sister also participated in, and completed a master's degree in Contemporary Dance Performance from the University of Limerick.

She was a judge on the 2006 Raidió Teilifís Éireann reality series Celebrity Jigs 'n' Reels. She premiered "Does She Take Sugar?" on April 12, 2007, at the Project Arts Centre in Dublin.

She retired from active dancing in 2010.

In January 2011, it was announced that she had designed and released her own jewellery line. The collection was launched at Showcase Ireland at the RDS later that month.

=== Films ===
Butler has appeared in several films: The Brylcreem Boys, Goldfish Memory, The Revengers Tragedy and Old Friends. She has also auditioned for large-budget Hollywood films such as, Meet Joe Black with Brad Pitt, and The Postman with Kevin Costner.

== Accolades ==
In 1999, Butler received an Irish Post Award, recognizing her for "Outstanding Contribution to Irish Dance". In 2009, she received the "Outstanding Contribution to Arts & Culture Alumni Award" from the University of Limerick. In January 2020, Irish America magazine inducted her into its own Irish America Hall of Fame.

== Personal life ==
Butler's father was a firefighter; in the 1990s, he was a deputy chief in the New York City Fire Department. Her mother is from County Mayo in Ireland. Her sister, Cara, is also a dancer and choreographer.

Butler married Irish designer Cuan Hanly in 2001.

== See also ==
- List of dancers
