= Cael Ua Neamhnainn =

Cael Ua Neamhnainn, was son of Crimthann, son of Neamhnainn king of Leinster. He was a noted Fianna leader and drowned at Cionn Trá (Ventry) in County Kerry.

== Lament of Cael ==
A lament was composed by the fairy-queen Creidhe after the drowning of her lover at Cionn Trá, County Kerry.

"The haven roars, and O the haven roars, over the rushing race of rinn dá bharc! The drowning of the warrior of loch dá chonn, that is what the wave impinging on the strand laments. Melodious in the crane, and O melodious is the crane, in the marshlands of druim dá thrén! ‘tis she that may not save her brood alive [lit. ‘that saves not her live ones’]: the wild dog of two colours [i.e. the fox] is intent upon her nestlings. A woeful note, and O a woeful note, is that which the thrush in Drumqueen emits! But not more cheerful is the wail that the blackbird makes in Letterlee. A woeful sound, and O a woeful sound, is the deer utters in Drumdaleish! Dead lies the doe of druim silenn, the mighty stag bells after her. Sore suffering to me, and O suffering sore, is the hero’s death – his death that used to lie with me! That the son of her out of doire dá dhos should be now with a truss beneath his head! Sore suffering to me is Cael, and O Cael is suffering sore, that by my side he is in dead man’s form! That the wave should have swept over his white body – that is what hath distracted me, so great was his delightfulness. A dismal roar, and O a dismal roar, is that the shore’s surf make upon the strand! Seeing that the same hath drowned a comely noble man, to me it is an affliction that ever Cael sought to encounter it. A woeful booming, and O a boom of woe, is that which the wave makes upon the northward beach! Butting as it does against the polished rock, lamenting for Cael now that he is gone. A woeful fight, and O a fight of woe, is that the wave wages with he southern shore! As for me, my span is determined; that my appearance [i.e. beauty] is impaired by this is noted. A woeful melody, and O a melody of woe, is that which the heavy surge of Tullachleish emits! As for me: the clamity that is fallen upon me having shattered me, for me prosperity exists no more. Since now Crimthann’s son is drowned, one that I may love after him there is not in being; many a chief is fallen by his hand, and in the battle his shield ne’er uttered outcry!"
