= Máirín Ní Mhuiríosa =

Irish scholar, poet and journalist

- Born: 5 September 1906; Dublin, Ireland
- Died: 27 August 1982 (aged 75); St Vincent's Hospital, Dublin
- Spouse: Pádraig Ó Cinnéide

Máirín Ní Mhuiríosa (5 September 1906 – 27 August 1982) was an Irish scholar, poet and journalist.

== Early life and family ==
Máirín Ní Mhuiríosa was born in Dublin on 5 September 1906. Her parents were Tomás Ó Muiríosa, a mathematics teacher, and Mary (née) Golden. Her parents were Irish speakers, and the family holidayed in the Gaeltacht at Ring, County Waterford. Ní Mhuiríosa attended school in Monaghan and Luxemburg. She was a member of Craobh Móibhí, the youth branch of Conradh na Gaeilge, participating in the group's 1920 production of An naomh ar iarraidh by Douglas Hyde and An tobar naofa by Séarlot Ní Dhunnlainge for the oireachtas drama competition. She entered University College Dublin in 1924, graduating in 1927 with a BA in Celtic studies, and an MA in Welsh in 1943. She was a member of staff of Coláiste Laighean between 1929 and 1952.

She married Pádraig Ó Cinnéide in 1928. He was secretary of the Department of Health from 1948 to 1959. They had one son and one daughter. Ní Mhuiríosa died in St Vincent's Hospital, Dublin on 27 August 1982, and is buried in Glasnevin Cemetery.

== Career ==
Ní Mhuiríosa's first scholarly work was an edition of Stair an Bhíobla ó lámhsgríbhinn do sgríobh Uáitéir Ó Ceallaigh tuairim na bliadhna MDCCXXVI, which was published in four volumes between 1941 and 1945. During the same period she worked on the Leabhair ó Láimhsgríbhnibh series, which was edited by Gerard Murphy. With Nessa Ní Shéaghdha she edited the Trí Bruidhne series: Bruidhean chéise coruinn, Bruidhean bheag na hAlmhan, Bruidhean eochaidh bhig dheirg, 1941. She edited Imtheacht an dá nónbhar agus tóraigheacht Taise Taoibhghile (1954) and Comhairle Mhic Lámha (1955).

She had an interest in the leaders of the early Irish-language revival movement. She published a number of articles on those early activists, Brian Ó Luanaigh in Feasta (1969), Rev. Euseby Digby in the Irish Press (1965), and Rev. Maxwell Close in Comhar (1966). This work culminated in a history of the prominent language activists of the Gaelic revival from 1876 and 1893, Réamhchonrathóirí (1968). Her essay, Gaeil agus Breatnaigh anallód, on the history of Wales won a prize at the 1972 oireachtas competition and was later published as a pamphlet in 1974. She published a handbook of Irish literary history in Welsh, Traddodiad Llenyddol Iwerddon, with J. E. Caerwyn Williams. The handbook was translated into Irish and expanded, published as Traidisiún liteartha na nGael in 1979.

From the foundation of the Sunday Press in 1949, Ní Mhuiríosa was a regular contributor with her column, Eadrainn féin. She was a member of numerous literary organisation, and was an acquaintance of other contemporary leading Irish language authors including Máirtín Ó Direáin. In 1946 she joined Cumann na Scríbhneoirí, being elected secretary two years later. As a member of a delegation, Ní Mhuiríosa met taoiseach Éamon de Valera in 1952. This meeting led to the foundation of Bord na Leabhar Gaeilge, a body to facilitate private publishers to publish in Irish. She served on the board's committee for 15 years, and was a director of An Club Leabhar for 20 years. Ní Mhuiríosa won a number of prizes for poetry at Oireachtas na Gaeilge, in 1968 she became president of the oireachtas. She was a member of the Board for Higher Education in the 1960s, and later was a member of the Higher Education Authority.
