= Muiredach Tirech =

4th century Irish king

Muiredach Tirech son of Fiacha Sraibhtine, was a semi-legendary High King of Ireland of the fourth century. He gained power by exiling the three Collas, who had killed his father. The Collas later returned and tried to provoke him into trying to kill them. When he did not, they entered his service and led his armies. He was overthrown by Cáelbad. “In the beginning of the fourth century, Muiredeach Tireach, High King of Ireland, directed his nephews, the three Collas, to face north and win sword land for themselves. On the ruins of the old kingdom of Uladh they founded a new kingdom—of Airgíalla—which was henceforth for nearly a thousand years to play an important part in the history of Ireland, and which was possessed afterwards by their descendants, the MacMahons, O'Hanlons, O'Carrolls, and Maguires.”

According to the Lebor Gabála Érenn and its derivative works Muiredach Tírech was the father of Eochaid Mugmedón, High King of Ireland, and therefore grandfather of Niall of the Nine Hostages and ancestor of the Uí Néill and Connachta dynasties.

Preceded by Colla Uais	High King of Ireland; AFM 326–356; FFE 310–343	Succeeded by Cáelbad
