= Saint Fothad =

Irish saint and poet

Saint Fothad, also known as Fothad Na Canoine ("of the canon") was an Irish monk and saint who lived in Fahan-Mura. monastery in modern-day County Donegal, Ireland during the late 8th century.

He moved quickly up to the rank of bard. Under the influence of Condmach mac Duib dá Leithe, abbot of Ard Macha, Fothad the Canonist drew up the remonstrance which procured for the clergy of Ireland the right of exemption from military service. One such crusade, against the Leinstermen, led to a great veneration of Fothad amongst the Irish.

He became a counsellor to High King of Ireland Áed Oirdnide; and both challenged and supported the king.

He also edited the Felire, an encyclopedia of saints compiled by Saint Aengus.
