= Conán mac Morna =

Fian warrior

Conán mac Morna, also known as Conán Maol ("the bald"), is a member of the fianna and an ally of Fionn mac Cumhail in the Fenian Cycle of Irish mythology. He is usually portrayed as a troublemaker and a comic figure, fat, greedy and blustering, although he is loyal to Fionn and never runs from a fight.
