= The Pursuit of Diarmuid and Gráinne =

Literary work

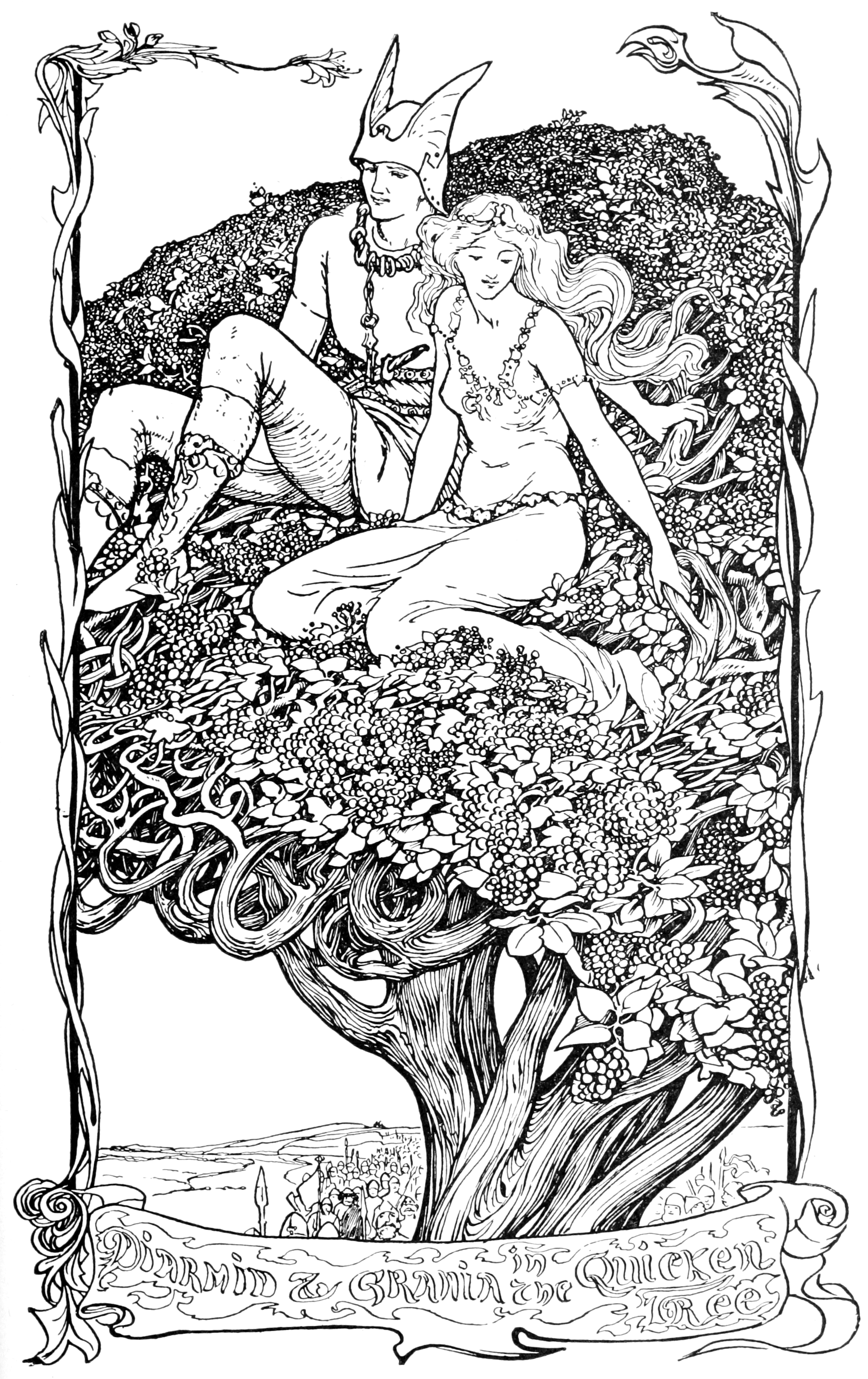
"Diarmid and Grania" by Henry Justice Ford in The Book of Romance (1902).

The Pursuit of Diarmuid and Gráinne (Irish: Tóraigheacht Dhiarmada agus Ghráinne or Tóraíocht Dhiarmada agus Ghráinne in modern spelling) is an Irish prose narrative surviving in many variants. A tale from the Fianna Cycle of Irish mythology, it concerns a love triangle between the great warrior Fionn mac Cumhaill, the beautiful princess Gráinne, and her paramour Diarmuid Ua Duibhne. Surviving texts are all in Modern Irish and the earliest dates to the 16th century, but some elements of the material date as far back as the 10th century.

== The pursuit ==
The story begins with the ageing Fionn, leader of the warrior band the Fianna, grieving over the death of his wife Maigneis. His men find that Gráinne, the daughter of High King Cormac mac Airt, is the worthiest of all women and arrangements are made for their wedding. At their betrothal feast, however, Gráinne is distressed that Fionn is older than her father, and becomes enamored with Fionn's handsome warrior Diarmuid (according to oral versions, this is because of the magical "love spot" on his forehead that makes him irresistible.) She slips a sleeping potion to the rest of the guests and encourages Diarmuid to run away with her. He refuses at first out of loyalty to Fionn, but relents when she threatens him with a geis forcing him to comply. They hide in a forest across the River Shannon, and Fionn immediately pursues them. They evade him several times with the help of other Fianna members and Aengus Óg, Diarmuid's foster father, who conceals Gráinne in his cloak of invisibility while Diarmuid leaps over the pursuers' heads.

Different variants from Ireland and Scotland contain different episodes, sending Diarmuid and Gráinne to all manner of places. Commonly Diarmuid refuses to sleep with Gráinne at first out of respect for Fionn; in one version she teases that water that has splashed up her leg is more adventurous than he is. A similar quip appears in some versions of the Tristan and Iseult legend. Another episode describes how the newly pregnant Gráinne develops a craving for rowan berries guarded by the one eyed giant Searbhán; though at first friendly to the lovers, Searbhán angrily refuses to give up the berries and Diarmuid must fight him. Searbhán's skill at magic protects him from Diarmuid's mortal weapons, but Diarmuid eventually triumphs by turning the giant's iron club against him.

== Diarmuid's reconciliation and death ==
After many other adventures, Diarmuid's foster father Aengus negotiates peace with Fionn. The lovers settle in Keshcorran, County Sligo where they have five children; in some versions, Fionn marries Gráinne's sister. Eventually Fionn organises a boar hunt near Benbulbin and Diarmuid joins, in spite of a prediction that he will be killed by a boar. Indeed, the creature wounds him mortally as he deals it a fatal blow. Fionn has the power to heal his dying comrade by simply letting him drink water from his hands, but he lets the water slip through his fingers twice. Finally Fionn's grandson Oscar threatens him with violence if he does not help Diarmuid, but when he returns from the well on the third attempt it is too late. Diarmuid has died.

Versions differ as to Gráinne's subsequent actions. In some Aengus takes Diarmuid's body to his home at Brú na Bóinne. In some Gráinne swears her children to avenge their father's death upon Fionn, while in others she grieves until she dies herself. In some she is reconciled with Fionn, and negotiates peace between him and her sons; or goes so far as to marry Fionn at last.

== Influence ==
The Pursuit of Diarmuid and Gráinne is notable for its similarities to other tales of love triangles in Irish and European literature. It has a number of parallels with the tale of Deirdre in the Ulster Cycle; like Gráinne, Deirdre is intended to marry a much older man, in this case the King of Ulster Conchobar mac Nessa, but she runs away with her young lover Naoise, who is finally killed after a long pursuit. However, earlier versions of Diarmuid and Gráinne may not have been so similar to the Ulster tale; for instance medieval references imply that Gráinne actually married Fionn and divorced him, rather than fleeing before their wedding. Another tale, Scéla Cano meic Gartnáin, includes an episode in which a young wife drugs everyone in her household besides her desired. As in Diarmuid and Gráinne she eventually convinces the reluctant hero to be her lover, with tragic results.

Various scholars have suggested Diarmuid and Gráinne had some influence on the Tristan and Iseult legend, notably Gertrude Schoepperle in 1913. That story developed in France during the 12th century, but its setting is in Britain. The hero, Tristan, falls in love with the Irish princess Iseult while escorting her to marry his uncle Mark of Cornwall. They begin their affair behind Mark's back, but after they are discovered their adventures take on more similarities to the Irish story, including an episode in which lovers stay in a secret forest hideout.

In Ireland, many Neolithic stone monuments with flat roofs (such as court cairns, dolmens and wedge-shaped gallery graves) bear the local name "Diarmuid and Gráinne's Bed" (Leaba Dhiarmada agus Ghráinne), being viewed as one of the fugitive couple's campsites for the night.

== In popular culture ==
- Diarmuid and Grania is a 1901 play in poetic prose by George Moore and W. B. Yeats, based on the translation of the tale by Lady Gregory, with incidental music by Edward Elgar.
- Tóruigheacht Dhiarmada agus Ghráinne was translated by Nessa Ní Shéaghda in 1967 and used in schools for study in Irish literature.
- Dancing on Dangerous Ground is a 1999 dance show based on the tale.
- The character Declan tells a version of the tale to Anna in the 2010 film Leap Year.
- The Irish writer and director Paul Mercier updated the story to Dublin's criminal underworld in his 2001 play Diarmuid and Gráinne. The film Pursuit, directed by him with a script adapted from the play, was released in 2015.
