= Diarmuid Ua Duibhne =

Demigod in Irish mythology

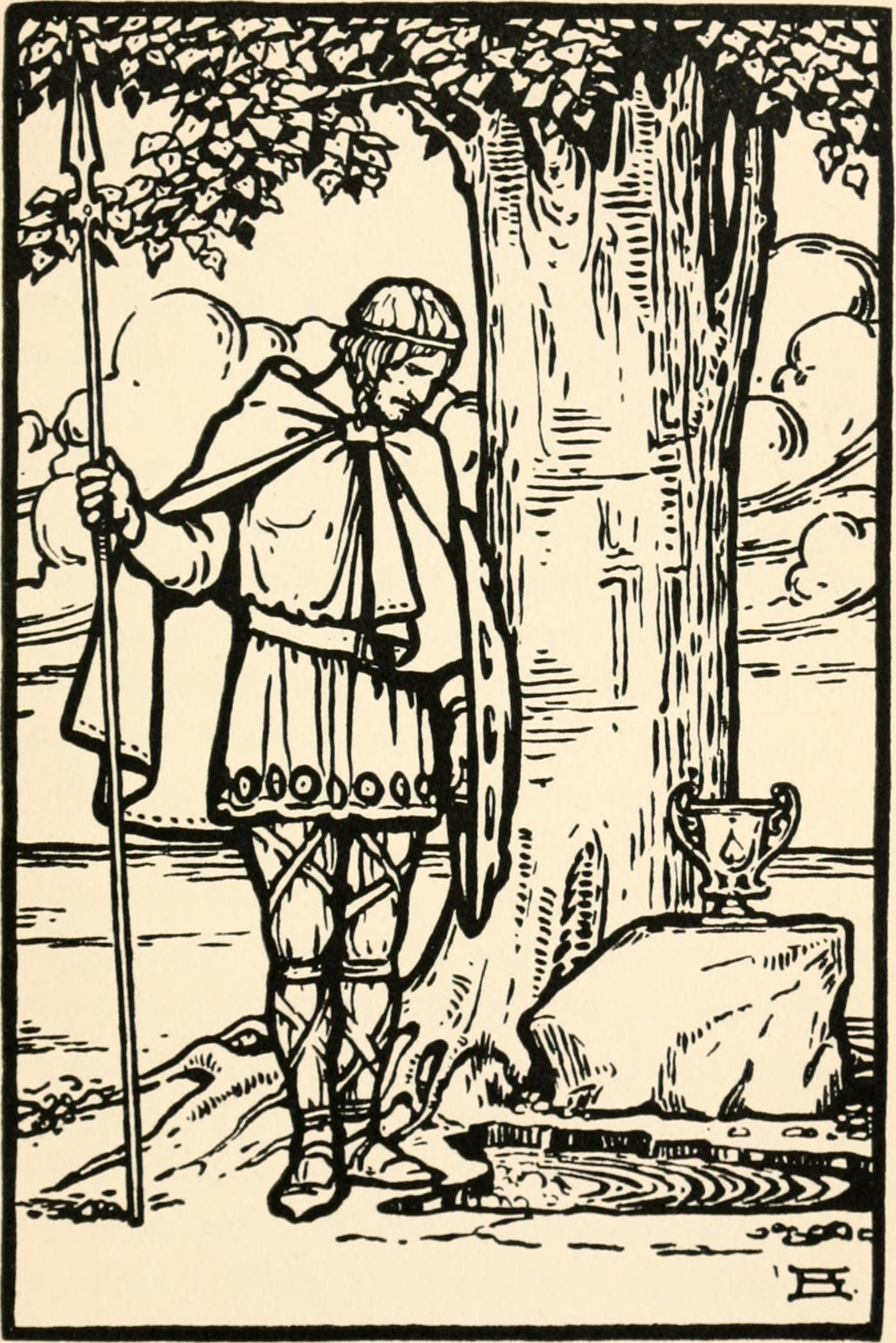
Diarmuid, illustration by Beatrice Elvery in Violet Russell's Heroes of the Dawn (1914)

Diarmuid Ua Duibhne (Irish pronunciation: [ˈdʲiəɾˠmˠədʲ uə ˈdˠɪvʲnʲə], lit. 'Diarmuid, grandson of Duibne'), also known as Diarmuid of the Love Spot, is a hero and demigod in the Fenian Cycle of Irish mythology, traditionally thought to be set in the 2nd to 4th century. He is the son of Donn, son of Duibhne of the Fianna, and Cochrann, daughter of Cathaír Mór. Diarmuid becomes the foster son and protégé of Aengus Óg, one of the Tuatha Dé Danann and the god of love, to the extent that a god of love can be said to exist in the corpus. He grows up to be a skilled warrior and a well-liked, valued member of the Fianna who on one occasion saves Fionn and his band by single-handedly slaying over three thousand enemies in battle.

Diarmuid is best known as the lover of Gráinne, the intended wife of Fianna leader Fionn mac Cumhaill in the legend The Pursuit of Diarmuid and Gráinne. Among his sons were Donnchadh, Iollann, Ruchladh and Ioruad.

Diarmuid Ua Duibhne is said to be the founder of the Scottish Clan Campbell. On the Campbell crest is a boar's head, a reference to Diarmuid's geis and death.

== Legend ==
=== Family ===
Diarmuid is a scion of the Fianna in both the paternal and the maternal line. His father's name is usually given as Donn, sometimes Corc; Duibhne of the Fianna is his paternal grandfather. His mother is Cochrann, Cróchnat or Crochnuit, daughter of Cathaír Mór and close relative of Fionn's herself. Around the time of Diarmuid's birth, his father is banished from the Fianna on account of an unspecified dispute. Diarmuid is taken in by Aengus Óg, to be raised in Aengus' house at Brú na Bóinne.

=== Curse ===
When Crochnuit later bears a son to Roc Diocain following an adulterous affair, Fionn's steward, Aengus, accepts Diarmuid's new half brother as his foster son as well. Donn has refused to accept the child into his household for the stated reason of the father being a commoner.

Attending a dinner party hosted by Aengus at Brú na Bóinne, Donn becomes jealous when the household lavishes the son of Roc with as much attention as his own son. He kills the steward's son, Congus, when no one is looking, but is eventually identified as the murderer through magical means. Roc suggests killing Diarmuid in retaliation but is prevented from immediately doing so by Aengus. With the help of a druid, Roc later resurrects his dead son in the form of a boar, then puts the boar under bonds to bring Diarmuid to death.

=== Ball Seirce ===
Diarmuid grows up to become a strong warrior. He is given a place among the Fianna and accomplishes many great deeds in their service, on one occasion fighting a wild ox for seven consecutive days and nights. He is popular with women.

After one of their hunting trips, Diarmuid and his companions discover they have ventured so far they are unable to get back home for the night. Aimlessly walking through the woods, they encounter a dwelling inhabited by an old man, a young girl, and a cat. The old man invites the group to dinner. Diarmuid and his friends prove their prowess by wrestling a wether – they lose, but only barely, and only because the wether fights with "the strength of the world", whose embodiment it turns out to be. The wether is ultimately subdued by the cat, a personification of death.

The group retires to bed. The men, one after the other, attempt to sleep with the young girl. The girl, who turns out to be a personification of youth, rejects the men – all of them in some versions, all of them except Diarmuid in others – on the grounds that she belonged to them once and cannot belong to them again. She does mark Diarmuid with the ball seirce, a magical love spot that makes him irresistible to any woman who lays eyes on him.

=== King Under-Wave ===
One snowy winter night an unkempt and repugnant woman, "very wild and ugly", appears at the lodge of the Fianna and requests to share one of the men's bedsteads. She is rejected by all but Diarmuid. She makes additional demands on the group's hospitality, which Diarmuid points out are impertinent given her appearance but grants regardless. In the morning, the visitor has magically become young and beautiful, and a grand new house has magically appeared on a nearby hill, "ready for them, with food and servants; and everything they could wish for." Overjoyed, Diarmuid asks the woman to move into the new house with him. She agrees on one condition: he cannot say out loud how ugly she looked on the night they met, at least not three times.

After three days in his new house, Diarmuid grows restless. The woman encourages him to join his comrades for the day. She promises to take good care of Diarmuid's beloved greyhound and her three new pups. While Diarmuid spends the day hunting, however, one of the Fianna manipulates the woman into giving him one of the pups. Returning home, Diarmuid gets upset and mentions the repellent state the woman arrived in. The following two days, the Fianna convince the woman to give away the remaining two pups, and Diarmuid again brings up her former ugliness. The third time he does so, the woman and the house disappear, and the greyhound dies. Carrying his dead dog, Diarmuid sets out to search for his lady.

An enchanted ship carries Diarmuid "out over the sea, and then down below it", to the otherworldly "Land-under-Waves". Walking its plains, he finds and collects three drops of blood. He also learns that the daughter of King Under-Wave has just returned home from abroad. She has been under some form of enchantment for seven years and is now gravely ill, beyond the help of physicians. The daughter turns out to be Diarmuid's lady. She is overjoyed to see Diarmuid again but states that she will never be well again – partly because of the drop of blood from her heart she lost every time she thought of him on her way home, partly because the cure for her illness consists in three draughts from the cup of the King of Magh an Ionganaidh, the faraway Plain of Wonder. Diarmuid leaves to retrieve the cup.

With the assistance of a mysterious "low-sized, reddish man", Diarmuid reaches the dun of the King of the Plain of Wonder and demands the cup. The kings sends multiple waves of fighting men, whom Diarmuid slays in many hours of battle. Having lost his army, the king himself emerges. Having learned that Diarmuid is a man of the Fianna of Ireland, the king realizes that Diarmuid is fulfilling a prophecy and willingly parts with his cup.

The "red man" instructs Diarmuid in the use of the cup but warns him that, along with her sickness, Diarmuid's love for the King's daughter will be gone. He identifies himself as a messenger from beyond the world who has come to Diarmuid's help because Diarmuid's "own heart is hot to come to the help of another". He further warns Diarmuid not to accept the "great riches" the King will offer him for healing his daughter but to ask only for a ship to bring him home to Ireland. The red man's prediction turns out to be correct. Diarmuid departs. In some versions of the story, the King's daughter restored the greyhound to life as a farewell gift.

=== Diarmuid and Gráinne ===
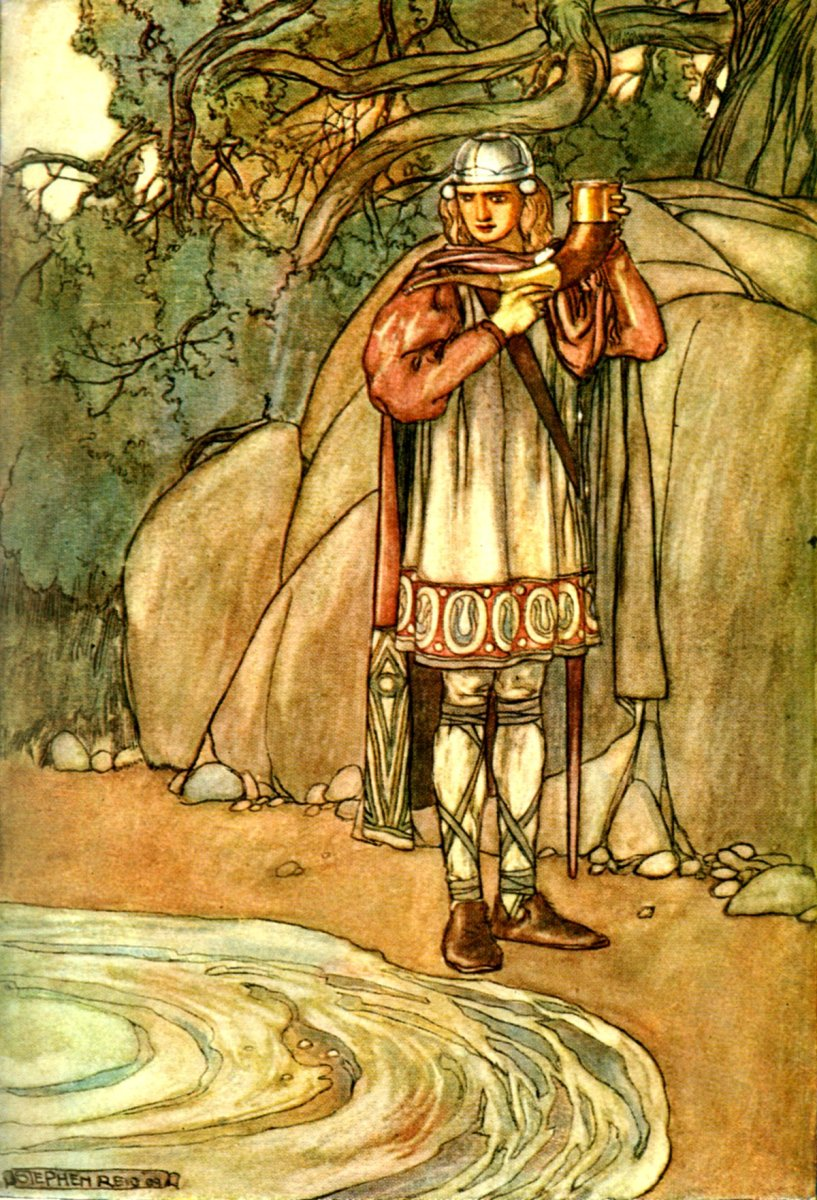
Illustration of Diarmuid by Stephen Reid

Fionn has been without female companionship since the death of his wife Maighneis, daughter of Black Garraidh. His son Oisin offers to bring him any woman, "willing or unwilling", Fionn will care to indicate. Diorraing the Druid suggests that the best woman for Fionn would be Gráinne, daughter of Cormac mac Airt, the High King of Ireland, "the woman of the best make and shape ... in the whole world". Fionn sends Osin and Diorraing to ask for Gráinne's hand in marriage. Citing tension between Cormac and himself, he stays behind. Cormac leave the decision to Gráinne, who at first accepts but develops second thoughts when she meets Fionn and notices his advanced age. At the wedding feast, Diarmuid catches her eye. She makes most of those present fall asleep using enchanted wine and asks Diarmuid to abscond with her. When Diarmuid refuses, she puts a spell on him. Diarmuid is magically compelled to leave the party, Gráinne in tow, knowing full well that Fionn will hunt the two of them down. Diarmuid and Gráinne cross the Sionnan and hide in the Doire-da-Bhoth, the Wood of the Two Huts.

When Fionn wakes up in the morning, he is gripped by "a scorching jealously" and immediately sends his trackers after the couple. The trackers, many of them loyal friends of Diarmuid's, declare themselves unable to carry the track across the Sionnan until Fionn threatens them with execution. Once across the Sionnan, Fionn guesses that the couple are hiding in the Wood of the Two Huts. Diarmuid's friends arrange for multiple warnings to be sent to Diarmuid, but Diarmuid chooses to stand and confront Fionn, much to Gráinne's dismay.

Diarmuid's protector Aengus Óg is given a vision of the danger Diarmuid is in, magically rushed to the Wood, and offers to sneak him out of his hideout under his cloak. Diarmuid declines but convinces Aengus to save Gráinne. Aengus brings Gráinne to Ros-da-Shoileach, the Headland of the Two Sallows. Diarmuid's friends offer to let him escape, but Diarmuid declines again; he does not wish to bring Fionn's wrath down upon them. He identifies the exact spot where Fionn himself would be facing him, then vaults across Fionn and his immediate retinue with the assistance of his spear. He joins Aengus and Gráinne in Ros-da-Shoileach. Aengus makes it clear to him that he will be on the run for the rest of his life.

Diarmuid and Gráinne travel on, fording rivers, crossing marshes, sleeping in caves. A young man named Muadhan volunteers to become their servant; he turns out to be of miraculous strength. Diarmuid encounters a great fleet of ships carrying three kings of the Green Champions. The kings, who have been summoned by Fionn to catch Diarmuid, are travelling with twenty hundred good fighting men and three invulnerable magical hounds. Diarmuid denies being Diarmuid but hints he may be in the general vicinity. On two consecutive nights, he shows off great and dangerous feats of strength. He manipulates large numbers of men into killing themselves trying to emulate him. On the third night, he kills most of the fighting men remaining, eventually subduing the kings themselves and tying them up. The kings are found by a woman messenger of Fionn's, who is however unable to loosen the ropes they are bound with. The kings manage, using their hounds, to track him down. Muadhan kills the dogs using magic, and Diarmuid kills the last few fighting men. The kings are slowly crushed to death by their ropes. Only the messenger survives.

In the centre of the Forest of Dubros were magical berries from the rowan tree that could restore the youth of an old person, guarded by the giant Searbhan on the instructions of the Tuatha Dé Danann. Diarmuid and Gráinne asked Searbhan if they could live and hunt game in the forest. Searbhan agreed on the condition that they would not eat the berries. Gráinne asked to eat the berries. Searbhan refused and attacked Diarmuid with his massive club. Diarmuid used Searbhan's own weapon to kill him.

Fionn gathered the Fianna and travelled to the wood where he had a fidchell board set up, and played his son Oisín. Oscar and Cailte assisted Oisín in the game, since no one except Diarmuid was a match against Fionn in this game. Diarmuid watched the game from above, and couldn't resist aiding Oisín in the game by tossing berries at the pieces. Fionn lost three straight matches to his son. Fionn realised that the couple were hiding in the tree and ordered men to kill his rival. Diarmuid killed seven warriors named Garbh. Oscar, Fionn's grandson, warned that anyone who harmed Diarmuid would face his anger, and escorted the couple safely away through the forest.

Fionn went to the Land of Promise to ask his old nurse Bodhmall to kill Diarmuid. Diarmuid was hunting in the forest beside the river Boyne and Bodhmall flew through the air on a flying water-lily and hurled poisoned darts that could penetrate his shield and armour. Diarmuid suffered agony where the darts struck him; he killed her with the Gáe Dearg.

Fionn pardoned Diarmuid after Aonghus Óg interceded on the couple's behalf; Diarmuid and Gráinne lived in peace at Ceis Chorainn in present-day County Sligo for several years. They had five children, four sons and a daughter. Diarmuid built a fort, Rath Gráinia. However, they went for years without visiting Grainne's father Cormac Mac Art and Diarmuid's former comrades. Gráinne persuaded Diarmuid to invite their friends and relations to a feast, including Fionn and the Fianna. Fionn invited Diarmuid on a boar hunt on the heath of Benn Gulbain; Diarmuid only took his short sword Beagalltach and his yellow spear, Gáe Buide, not his best weapons. He was gored by a giant boar which had already killed a number of men and hounds.

Water drunk from Fionn's hands had the power of healing, but when Fionn gathered water, he twice let it run through his fingers before he could bring it to Diarmuid. Threatened by his son Oisín and grandson Oscar, he fetched water a third time, but this time he was too late: Diarmuid had died.

After Diarmuid's death, Aengus took his body back to the Brugh, where he breathed life into it whenever he wished to speak with the hero.

Tóraigheacht Dhiarmada agus Ghráinne has often been compared with the earlier love triangle between Deirdre, Noísi and King Conchobar of Ulster, Longes mac nUislenn (The Exile of the Sons of Uisliu), which is part of the Ulster Cycle.

=== Famous weapons ===
Manannán mac Lir, a sea god, presents Aengus Óg with an invincible magical sword named either Móralltach or Nóralltach, the Great Fury. In The Pursuit of Diarmuid and Gráinne it is said of Móralltach that it left no stroke nor blow unfinished at the first trial. Aengus passes Móralltach on to Diarmuid, along with a second sword, Beagalltach, the Little Fury.

Diarmuid also owns several other weapons known by specific names, including Gáe Buidhe, the Yellow Spear, Crann Buidhe, the Yellow Shaft, and Gáe Dearg, the Red Spear. The spears inflict wounds that cannot be healed. Diarmuid uses Móralltach and Gáe Dearg for adventures that are matters of life and death, Beagalltach and Gáe Buidhe and lesser battles.

== In popular culture ==
One of the many craters on Europa named after Celtic figures is named specifically after Diarmuid.
