= Nessa Ní Shéaghdha =

Irish Celtic Studies scholar

- Born: 14 March 1916; Drumcondra, Dublin
- Died: 11 April 1993 (aged 77); Dublin

Nessa Ní Shéaghdha or Nessa O (14 March 1916 – 11 April 1993) was an Irish scholar of Celtic studies.

== Biography ==
Nessa Ní Shéaghdha was born to Seán Pádraig Ó Séaghdha and Kitty Nic Caochlaoich on 14 March 1916 at 20 Aran Road, Drumcondra, Dublin. Her father was an important industrial and nationalist figure in Ireland. They had six children in total: Ní Shéaghdha had a brother and four sisters.

She attended Scoil Bhríde and Scoil Chaitríona before going on to study in University College Dublin in 1936. She trained under Osborn Bergin and Gerard Murphy, completing a degree in Old Irish. Ní Shéaghdha then completed her master's degree under Bergin. She started working in the Leabhair ó láimhsgríbhinigh project, which was established in 1937 and aimed to provide "readers of modern Irish" with texts which had not been printed previously. Working for Gerard Murphy and with Máire Ní Mhuirgheasa, Ní Shéaghdha created the second and third volume in the series: Trí bruidhne, 1941. Ní Shéaghdha edited Bruidhean Chéise Coruinn, Bruidhean Bheag na hAlmhan and Bruidhean chaorthainn with Máirín Ní Mhuiríosa, drawing from manuscripts in the National Library of Scotland. Ní Shéaghdha spent time in Edinburgh. It was there she made friends with Sorley MacLean. He fell in love with her and she was the inspiration for several of his poems.

Ní Shéaghdha also edited and translated a number of texts of histories of Ireland and mythologies including Tóruigheacht Dhiarmada agus Ghráinne.

Although she had to stop working for a time, Ní Shéaghdha was a graduate of the School of Celtic Studies at the Dublin Institute for Advanced Studies from 1950 to 1954. She retired in 1981 after working as a scholar and Research Assistant. She continued working on her project of cataloging Irish manuscripts after she retired. Ní Shéaghdha also gave lectures in the Universities and acted as an external examiner.

== Personal life ==
Ní Shéaghdha married David J. Doran in 1939. They had a son and three daughters. The family lived in Corca Dhuibhne, Dundrum, Dublin.

Once her family was older she worked part-time, from 1954 to 1981. Not being able to work had an effect on the progression of her career, which can be seen when reflected against the lives of some of her classmates. She died 11 April 1993. She is buried in Enniskerry, County Wicklow.

== Bibliography ==
- Stair fhír-cheart ar Éirinn (1941)
- Agallamh na seanórach (1942–5)
- Tóruigheacht Dhiarmada agus Ghráinne (1967)
- Translations and Adaptions Into Irish (1984), Dublin Institute for Advanced Studies.
- "Collectors of Irish manuscripts: motives and methods" (1985), Celtica, xvii
- "Irish scholars and scribes in eighteenth-century Dublin" (1989), Eighteenth-Century Ireland, iv, 41–54.
