= Plor na mBan =

Figure in Irish mythology

In Irish mythology, Plúr na mBan (pronounced ploor-nu-mon)—meaning "the flower of women"—was the daughter of Oisín and Niamh.
