= Caílte mac Rónáin =

Nephew of Fionn mac Cumhaill

Caílte (Modern Irish: Caoilte) mac Rónáin was a nephew of Fionn mac Cumhaill, a warrior and a member of the fianna in the Fenian Cycle of Irish mythology. He is described as being able to run at remarkable speed and communicate with animals, and was a great storyteller. Some poems of the Fenian Cycle are attributed to Caílte.

In the short Middle Irish tale Finn and Gráinne, his ancestry is given as "son of Oisgen or Conscen, the son of the Smith of Múscraige Dobrut; a son he of Cumall's daughter."

Caílte's most celebrated fellow survivor was Oisín: according to Cath Gabhra (The Battle of Gabhra), Caílte and Oisín are the only members of the Fianna to survive that final battle. They are both central figures in the tale Acallam na Senórach (Colloquy of the Ancients), in which they survive into Christian times and recount tales of the Fianna to a recently arrived Saint Patrick.

In Irish mythology, Cas Corach was a hero who helped Caílte mac Rónáin kill three werewolf-like creatures, the daughters of Airitech who would come out of the Cave of Cruachan every year around Samhain and destroy sheep. The she-wolves liked music, so he aided in their slaying by playing a harp to attract and distract them and by persuading them to change to human form, while Caoilte cast a spear that penetrated all three, thereby killing them.

He had the sword Cruadh-Chosgarach, the Hard Destroying One.

The 'Bodb Dearg', a god in Fianna time who is the son of the Dagda had a daughter called Scathniamh. She and Cailte loved each other. But they were forced to part from one another, and they never met again till the time Caoilte was old and withered, and one of the last that was left of the Fianna.

== Primary sources ==
- Finn and Gráinne, ed. and tr. Kuno Meyer, "Finn and Grainne." Zeitschrift für celtische Philologie 1 (1897): 458–61. Edition and translation available from CELT.
- Cath Gabhra ("The Battle of Gabhra")

Caolte is characterized in the poem by W.B. Yeats, "The Hosting of the Sidhe."
