= Fianna =

Celtic warrior bands of legend

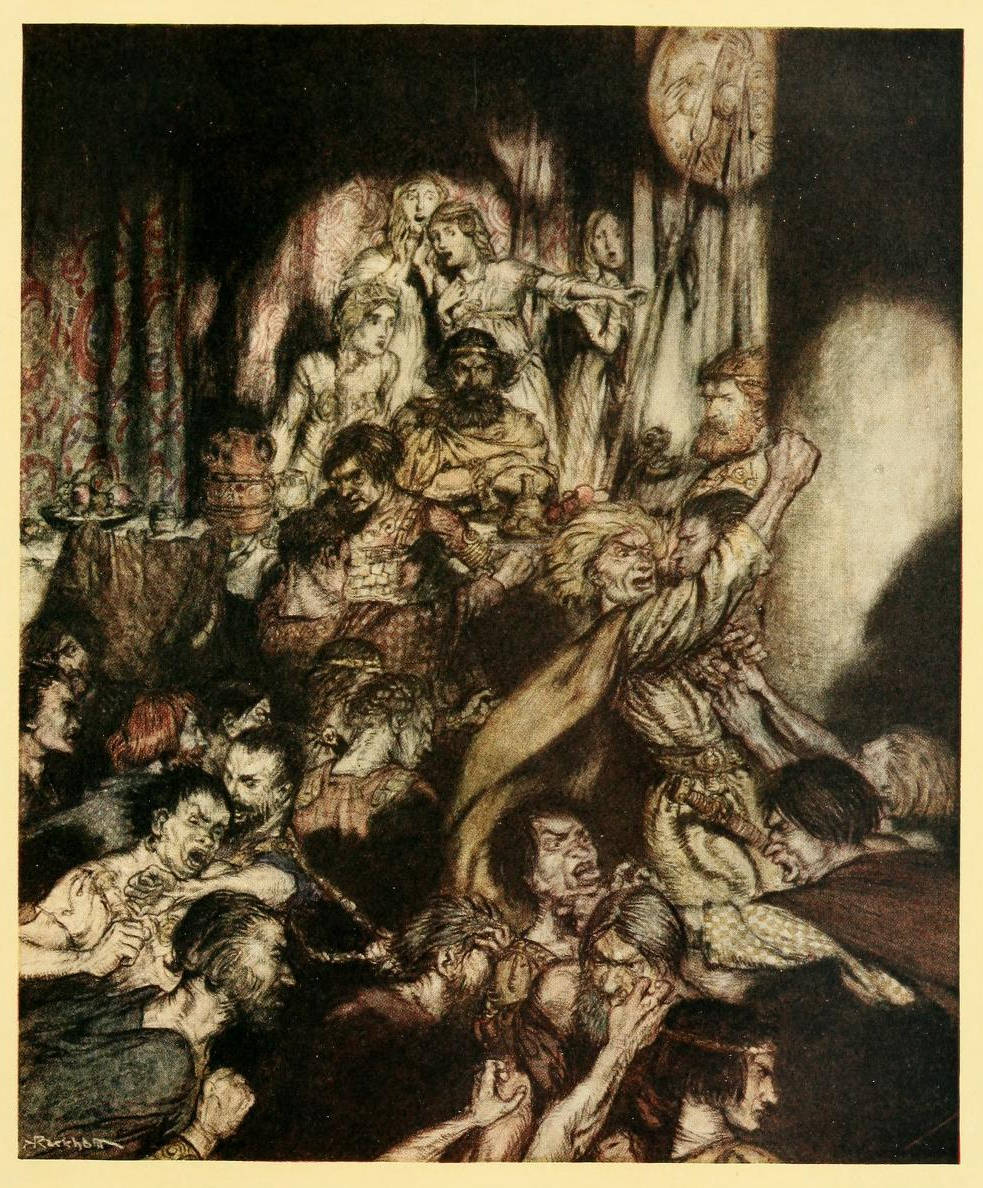
Fionn and Goll seated in a banquet hall as their rival bands of Fianna fight. Illustration by Arthur Rackham in Irish Fairy Tales (1920).

Fianna (/ˈfiːənə/ FEE-ə-nə, Irish: [ˈfʲiən̪ˠə]; sing. fían; Scottish Gaelic: Fèinne [ˈfeːɲə]; sing. fiann) were small warrior-hunter bands in Gaelic Ireland during the Iron Age and early Middle Ages. A fian was made up of freeborn young men, often from the Gaelic nobility of Ireland, "who had left fosterage but had not yet inherited the property needed to settle down as full landowning members of the túath". For most of the year they lived in the wild, hunting, cattle raiding other Irish clans, training, and fighting as mercenaries. Scholars believe the fian was a rite of passage into manhood, and have linked fianna with similar young warrior bands in other early European cultures.

They are featured in a body of Irish legends known as the 'Fianna Cycle' or 'Fenian Cycle', which focuses on the adventures and heroic deeds of the fian leader Fionn mac Cumhaill and his band. In later tales, the fianna are more often depicted as household troops of the High Kings.

The Fenian Brotherhood of the 19th century and the Fianna Éireann, an Irish nationalist youth organisation of the 20th century, are named after them.

== Origins ==
Scholars have linked the fianna with similar young warrior bands in other early European cultures, and suggest they all derive from the *kóryos which is thought to have existed in Proto-Indo-European society.

Linguist Ranko Matasović, author of the Etymological Dictionary of Proto-Celtic, derives the name fíana from reconstructed Proto-Celtic *wēnā (a troop), from Proto-Indo-European *weyh (to chase, pursue), and says the Irish ethnic name Féni is probably related. Kim McCone derives it from Proto-Celtic *wēnnā < *wēd-nā (wild ones).

== In historical sources ==
The historical institution of the fían is known from references in early medieval Irish law tracts. A fían (plural fíana or fianna) was a small band of roving hunter-warriors. It was made up of landless young men of free birth, often young aristocrats, "who had left fosterage but had not yet inherited the property needed to settle down as full landowning members of the túath". A member of a fían was called a fénnid; the leader or "king" (rí) of a fían was a rígfénnid. The fían way of life was called fíanaigecht and involved living in the wild, hunting, raiding, martial and athletic training, and even training in poetry. They also served as mercenaries. Wild animals, particularly the wolf and the deer, seem to have been fían mascots. Some sources associate fianna with the outdoor cooking pits known as fulacht fiadh.

Many of the first mentions of fianna are connected with Scoti raids in Britain during the end of the Roman rule.

Geoffrey Keating, in his 17th-century History of Ireland, says that during the winter the fianna were quartered and fed by the nobility, during which time they would keep order on their behalf, but during the summer/autumn, from Beltaine to Samhain, they were obliged to live by hunting for food and for pelts to sell. Keating's History is more a compilation of traditions than a reliable history, but in this case scholars point to references in early Irish literature and the existence of a closed hunting season for deer and wild boar between Samhain and Beltaine in medieval Scotland as corroboration. Hubert Thomas Knox (1908) likened the fianna to "bodies of Gallowglasses such as appeared in the fifteenth and sixteenth centuries, but then under command of adventurers who were not inhabitants of the province, Free Companies who sold their services to any one who could raise their wages".

Joseph Nagy writes that the fían seemingly "served a vital function in siphoning off undesirable elements [...] providing an outlet for rambunctious behaviour", and was a rite of passage that prepared young men for adult life. Katharine Simms writes that "While most members eventually inherited land, married and settled down, some passed their lives as professional champions, employed by the rest of the population to avenge their wrongs, collect debts, enforce order at feasts and so forth".

The fían was a tolerated institution in early Irish secular society, and secular literature continued to endorse it down to the 12th century. However, the institution was not favoured by the church, and it is likely the church was key in the demise of the fían. Churchmen sometimes referred to them as díberga (which came to mean 'marauders') and maicc báis ('sons of death'), and several hagiographies tell of saints converting them from their "non-Christian and destructive ways".

They are described as having a cúlán hairstyle: long at the back, with the scalp partly shaved. Some are also described as having strange or 'devilish' marks on their head; this has been taken to mean tattoos.

== Legendary depiction ==
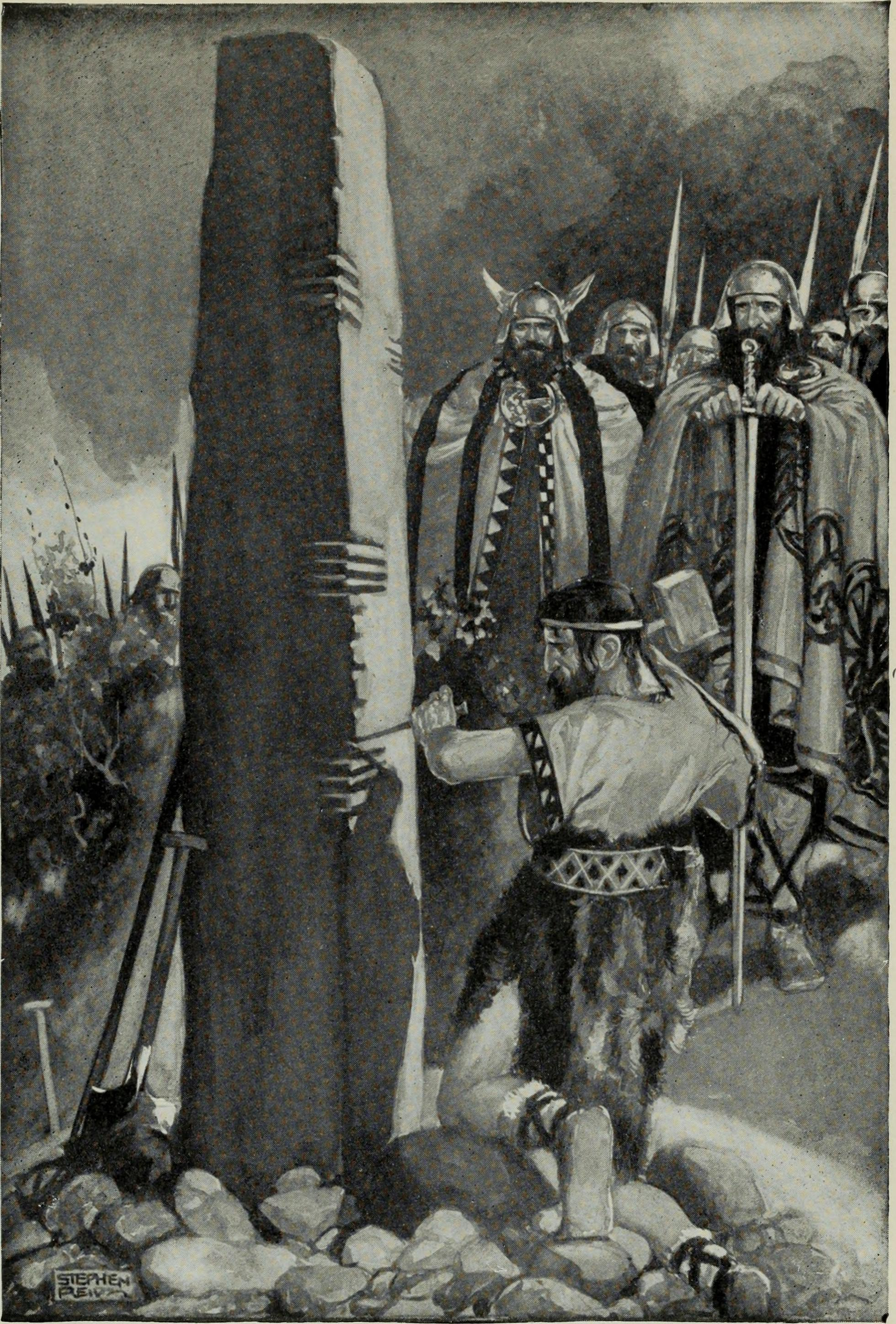
"The Fianna raised a pillar stone with her name in Ogham letters" - illustration by Stephen Reid in Myths & Legends of the Celtic Race (1911)

The fianna are the focus of a body of Irish legends known as the Fíanaigecht, 'Fianna Cycle' or 'Fenian Cycle'. Most are about the adventures and heroic deeds of Finn (or Fionn) mac Cumhaill and his fían members.

In earlier tales, the various fianna groups are depicted as roving hunter-warriors, and there are many pagan and magical elements. Later tales focus on Fionn and his companions, and the fianna are more often depicted as household troops of the High Kings. These later tales usually depict the fianna as one group with two factions: the Clann Baíscne of Leinster, led by Fionn, and the Clann Morna of Connacht, led by Goll mac Morna.

Some legendary depictions of fianna seem to conform to historical reality: for example, in the Ulster Cycle the druid Cathbad leads a fian of 27 men which fights against other fianna and kills the 12 foster-fathers of the Ulster princess Ness. In response, Ness leads her own fian of 27 in pursuit of Cathbad.

=== War cry and mottos ===
The Dord Fian or Dord Fiansa was the war-cry of the Fianna, and they often sounded it before and amid battle, either as a mode of communication or to put fear into their enemies. In the legend "The Death of Fionn", Fionn raises the Dord Fian when he sees his grandson Oscar fall in the Battle of Gabhra against the armies of Cairbre Lifechair, and proceeds to strike back at the enemy with great fury, killing many dozens of warriors. The Battle of Gabhra also marked the demise of the Fianna.

They had three mottoes:

- Glaine ár gcroí (Purity of our hearts)
- Neart ár ngéag (Strength of our limbs)
- Beart de réir ár mbriathar (Action to match our speech)

=== Notable fénnid ===
- Fionn mac Cumhaill: last leader of the Fianna
- Cumhall: Fionn's father, the former leader
- Goll mac Morna
- Caílte mac Rónáin
- Conán mac Morna
- Diarmuid Ua Duibhne: a warrior of the Fianna who ran off with Fionn's intended bride Gráinne and was finally killed by a giant boar on the heath of Benn Gulbain. Foster son of Aengus.
- Lughaid Lámhfhada: sorcerous warrior, nephew of Fionn, one of the four who could have untied the knots Diarmuid bound the sea-kings with, but refused to do so. Lover of Aífe, daughter of Manannán
- Oisín, son of Fionn (Macpherson's Ossian)
- Oscar, son of Oisín
- Cael Ua Neamhnainn

== Modern use of the term ==
In more recent history, the name Fianna Éireann has been used, as Fianna Fáil ("the Fianna of Ireland", or Inis Fáil i.e. "the isle of destiny", and hence sometimes rendered "the soldiers of destiny") has been used: as a sobriquet for the Irish Volunteers, on the cap badge of the Irish Army, the name in Irish of the Army Ranger Wing (Sciathán Fiannóglaigh an Airm), in the opening line of the Irish-language version of the Irish national anthem, and as the name of the Fianna Fáil political party.

== See also ==
- Kóryos
- Irish Fairy Tales, a 1920 book by James Stephens containing many tales of the Fianna
