= Saverio Bettinelli =

Italian Jesuit writer (1718–1808)

The Reverend Saverio Bettinelli S.J.
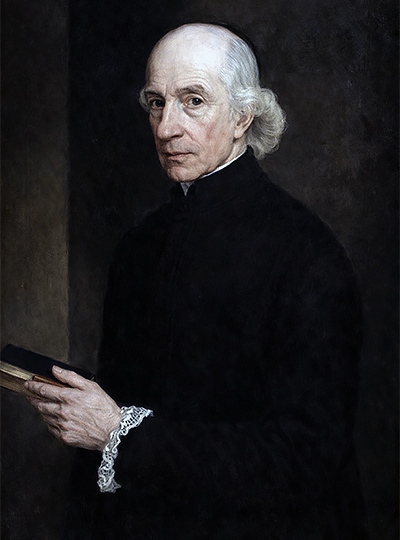
- Portrait of Saverio Bettinelli by Domenico Conti Bazzani, 1800
- Born: July 18, 1718; Mantua, Duchy of Mantua
- Died: 13 September 1808 (aged 90); Mantua, Kingdom of Italy
- Other names: M. Versajo Melasio; Diodoro Delfico
- Occupations: Jesuit priest; Dramatist; Polemicist; Poet; Literary critic
- Parent(s): Girolamo Bettinelli and Paola Bettinelli (née Frugoni)

Academic background
- Influences: Racine; Corneille; Voltaire

Academic work
- Era: Age of Enlightenment; Preromanticism
- Discipline: Literary criticism, italian studies, Medieval studies
- Institutions: University of Modena
- Influenced: Alfieri; Monti; Verri; Gioberti; Schlegel; Tommaseo; Cantù

Signature
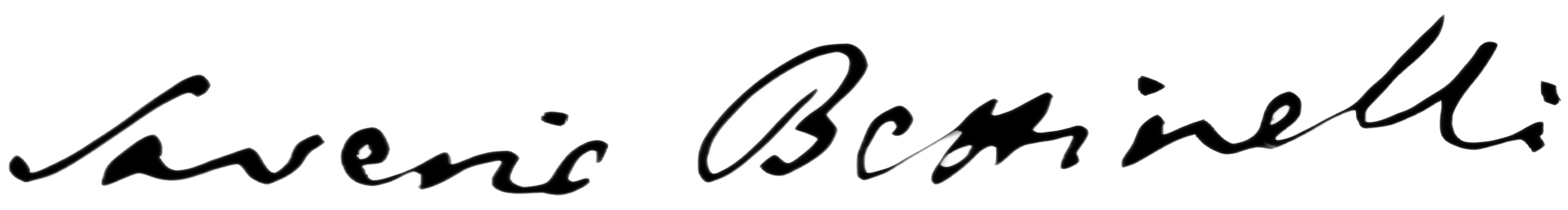

Saverio Bettinelli S.J. (18 July 1718 – 13 September 1808) was an Italian Jesuit priest and writer. He became known as a polymath, dramatist, polemicist, poet, and literary critic. He was a friend of some of the leading authors of his times: Voltaire, Francesco Algarotti, Vincenzo Monti and Ippolito Pindemonte. Théodore Tronchin, Guillaume du Tillot, Melchiorre Cesarotti, Giacomo Filippo Durazzo, Pietro Verri, Giammaria Mazzucchelli and Francesco Maria Zanotti were among his correspondents.

== Life ==
He was born at Mantua; there and later in Bologna, he studied under the Jesuits, till entering in novitiate in 1736, then formally consecrated as a priest in 1738.

He first taught literature from 1739 to 1744 at Brescia, where Cardinal Quirini, Count Federico Mazzuchelli, Count Duranti and other scholars, formed an illustrious academy. He next went to Bologna, to study divinity. There, he was in contact with the circle including the poet Marini, Algarotti, and Zanotti. At the age of thirty he went to Venice, where he became professor of rhetoric. There he wrote the satirical poem Le raccolte (1751), in which he called for a reform of the Italian poetic tradition, aimed at both the literary elite and the public. The superintendence of the college of nobles at Parma was entrusted to him in 1751; and he had principal charge of the studies of poetry and history, and the entertainments of the theatre. He remained there eight years, visiting, at intervals, other cities of Italy, often on the affairs of his order.

In 1755-1758, he undertook a series of journeys. First travelling to Germany in 1755, proceeded as far as Strasbourg and Nancy. He returned to Italy as a tutor to the sons of the Prince of Hohenlohe. The year following, he journeyed again to France, along with the eldest of his pupils; and during this excursion he wrote his famous Lettere dieci di Virgilio agli Arcadi, which were published at Venice. Bettinelli was also a poet of arcadic verse, collected in his Versi sciolti of 1758 and inspired by Frugoni and Algarotti. In 1758, he went to Lorraine, to the court of King Stanislaus, who sent him on a matter of business to visit Voltaire. He would also meet in France with Rousseau and Helvétius.

From Geneva he returned to Parma, where he arrived in 1759. He afterwards lived for some years at Verona and Modena, and he had just been appointed professor of rhetoric there, when, in 1773, the suppression of the Jesuit Order occurred in Italy, he had to abandon his teaching post at Modena, Bettinelli returned home, and resumed his literary labours with new ardor. The siege of Mantua by the French compelled him to leave the city, and he retired to Verona, where he formed an intimate friendship with the poet Ippolito Pindemonte.

His major works are the literary criticisms and observations of culture. In 1757, he penned a series of letters addressed to Virgil in which he criticized the Divine Comedy by Dante Alighieri, and affirmed that Among the erudite books, only certain parts from the Divine Comedy should be included, and these would form no more than five cantos Voltaire was to praise his idiosyncratic opinions.

In 1766, he wrote Lettere inglesi where he proposes good taste in modern literature. Bettinelli critiqued the rationalist stile geomètrique associated with Descartes and promoted the importance o energy and personal experience in the creation of enduring artistic works. In Dell'entusiasmo delle belle arti (On Enthusiasm in the Fine Arts, 1769), he exalts enthusiasm as a source of inspiration for fantasy in art according to a tendency that was pre-romantic. Among his main works is an influential sketch of the progress of literature, science, fine arts, industry, and customs in Italy, originally titled Risorgimento negli studi, nelle, Arti e ne' Costumi dopo di Mille (The Revival of Italy in Scholarship, Arts and Customs After 1000, 1773).

Bettinelli was one of the most significant dramatist of the Jesuit theater in Italy. Three tragedies constitute the sum of Bettinelli's dramatic compositions: Gionata, staged in Venice in 1755, Demetrio Poliorcete, in Imola in 1770, and Serse, in Parma in 1787. In addition, he translated into Italian Voltaire's Rome Sauvée, performed in Parma in 1772. Through his plays, with their varied themes, runs an understated spirit of patriotism that echoes Alfieri.

In 1797, Bettinelli returned to Mantua. Though nearly eighty years old, he resumed his labors and his customary manner of life. He undertook in 1799 a complete edition of his works, which was published at Venice in 24 vols. At this death, at the age of 90 years, he still retained his gaiety and vivacity of mind.

== Works ==
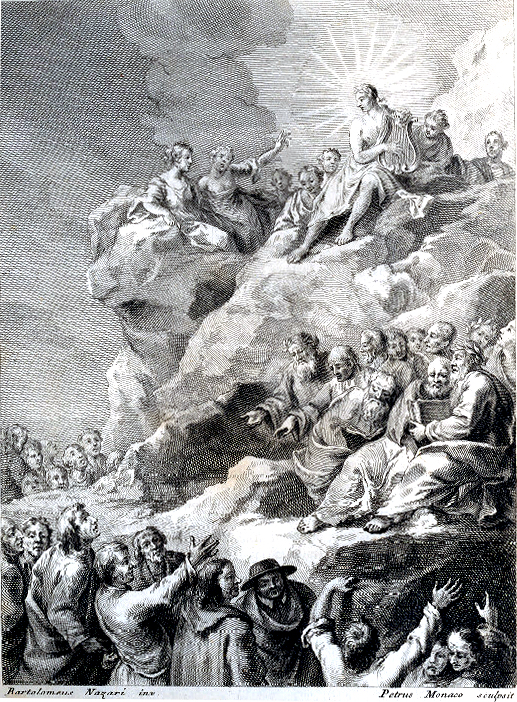
Frontispiece of Bettinelli's Lettere Virgiliane, Venice, 1758

- Saverio Bettinelli (1758). Dieci Lettere di Publio Virgilio Marone scritte dagli Elisi all'Arcadia di Roma sopra gli abusi introdotti nella poesia italiana [Ten Letters by Publio Virgilio Marone Written from the Elysian Fields to the Roman Arcadia Concerning the Malpractices Introduced into Italian Poetry]. Venice: Fenzo.
- Saverio Bettinelli (1766). Dodici Lettere Inglesi sopra varii argomenti e sopra la letteratura italiana [Twelve Letters by an Englishman on Various Matters and Particularly on Italian Literature]. Venice: Pasquali.
- Tragedie di Saverio Bettinelli della Compagnia di Gesù con la traduzione della Roma salvata di Mr de Voltaire e una cantata per la venuta dell'Imperador a Roma dedicate all'Altezza Reale della Serenissima Principessa Maria Beatrice Ricciarda d'Este Arciduchessa d'Austria. Bassano: Remondini. 1771.
- Delle lettere e delle arti mantovane. Mantua: Pannozzi. 1774.
- Del Risorgimento d'Italia negli studj, nelle arti, e ne' costumi dopo il mille dell'abate Saverio Bettinelli. Venice: Remondini. 1786.
- Saverio Bettinelli (1799). Ragionamenti. Venice: Adolfo Cesare.
- Saverio Bettinelli (1799). Dell'entusiasmo delle belle arti. 1. 1. Venice: presso Adolfo Cesare.
- Saverio Bettinelli (1799). Dell'entusiasmo delle belle arti. 2-3. 2. Venice: presso Adolfo Cesare.
- Saverio Bettinelli (1799). Dialoghi d'amore. 1. 1. Venice: presso Adolfo Cesare.
- Saverio Bettinelli (1799). Dialoghi d'amore. 2. 2. Venice: presso Adolfo Cesare.
- Saverio Bettinelli (1800). Accademiche dissertazioni su la poesia scritturale. Venice: Adolfo Cesare.
- Saverio Bettinelli (1800). Delle lettere e delle arti mantovane. Venice: Adolfo Cesare.
- Saverio Bettinelli (1800). Serse re di Persia. Venice: Adolfo Cesare.
- Saverio Bettinelli (1800). Discorso sopra la poesia italiana. Venice: presso Adolfo Cesare.
- Saverio Bettinelli (1800). Lettere 20 di una dama ad una sua amica su le belle arti. Venice: presso Adolfo Cesare.
- Saverio Bettinelli (1800). Lettere di Virgilio e inglesi. Venice: presso Adolfo Cesare.
- Opere edite ed inedite in prosa ed in versi. Seconda edizione riveduta, ampliata, e corretta dall'Autore, 24 vols., revised and enlarged edition, Venice: Cesare, 1799–1801.
- Saverio Bettinelli (1801). Sull'eloquenza. Venice: Adolfo Cesare.
- Saverio Bettinelli (1801). Lettere a Lesbia Cidonia sopra gli epigrammi. 1-21. 1. Venice: presso Adolfo Cesare.
- Saverio Bettinelli (1801). Lettere a Lesbia Cidonia sopra gli epigrammi. 22-25. 2. Venice: presso Adolfo Cesare.
- F. Algarotti; S. Bettinelli (1969). Ettore Bonora (ed.). Opere. Milan-Naples: Ricciardi.

== Bibliography ==
- Suard, Jean-Baptiste-Antoine (1803). "De Voltaire et du poète italien Bettinelli". Mélanges de littérature (in French). I. Paris: 17–32.
- Galeani Napione, Francesco (1809). Vita dell'abate Saverio Bettinelli. Turin: Presso i Fratelli Pomba.
- This article incorporates text from a publication now in the public domain: Chisholm, Hugh, ed. (1911). "Bettinelli, Saverio". Encyclopædia Britannica. Vol. 3 (11th ed.). Cambridge University Press.
- Bonfatti, Alfredo (1952). "Il petrarchismo critico di Saverio Bettinelli". Lettere Italiane. 4 (3): 151–180. ISSN 0024-1334. JSTOR 26243867.
- Binni, Walter (1966). "La critica fra Illuminismo e Preromanticismo: Bettinelli e Baretti". In Emilio Cecchi; Natalino Sapegno (eds.). Storia della letteratura italiana. Vol. VI. Milan: Garzanti. pp. 628–630.
- Finoli, Anna Maria (1968). "Inediti francesi del Bettinelli". Lettere Italiane. 20 (3): 391–402. JSTOR 26248935.
- Fubini, Mario (1970). "Bettinelli, Saverio". In Umberto Bosco (ed.). Enciclopedia Dantesca. Rome: Istituto dell'Enciclopedia Italiana.
- Bonora, Ettore (1983). "Il pensiero critico del Bettinelli; Le tragedie e la poetica del tragico di Saverio Bettinelli; L'"entusiasmo delle belle arti" e Pietro Verri". Parini e Altro Settecento. Milan: Feltrinelli.
- Colombo, Angelo (1986). "Nota su Cesarotti e Dante. Con quattro lettere a Saverio Bettinelli". Lettere Italiane. 38 (3): 362–378. JSTOR 26263874.
- Bonora, Ettore (1998). Bettinelli e Virgilio, dall'Arcadia al Leopardi. Modena: Mucchi.
- Ilaria Crotti; Ricciarda Ricorda, eds. (1998). Saverio Bettinelli. Un gesuita alla scuola del mondo. Roma: Bulzoni. ISBN 88-8319-226-5.
- Ricorda, Ricciarda. Il "Parnaso veneziano": Bettinelli e la cultura veneziana. pp. 247–271.
- Crotti, I. (2002). "Bettinelli, Saverio". The Oxford Companion to Italian Literature. Oxford University Press. ISBN 978-0-19-818332-7.
- Di Ricco, Alessandra (2013). "Idee di nazione tra i letterati del Settecento: Gian Rinaldo Carli, Saverio Bettinelli, Francesco Algarotti". Idea di nazione nel Settecento. Rome: Edizioni di storia e letteratura. pp. 133–145. doi:10.1400/212178.
- Besutti, Paola (2019). "Saverio Bettinelli e la musica". Testo: Studi di teoria e storia della letteratura e della critica. 77 (1): 35–49. doi:10.19272/201905501004.
- Arato, Franco (2019). "In questo secolo sventurato: Bettinelli apologista cattolico". Testo: Studi di teoria e storia della letteratura e della critica. 77 (1): 79–89. doi:10.19272/201905501007.
- Forner, Fabio (2022). "Saverio Bettinelli e Angelo Mazza: un petrarchista e un dantista per gioco?". Studi sul Settecento e l'Ottocento: Rivista internazionale di italianistica. XVII (17): 147–158. doi:10.19272/202207401010.
