= Ossian =

Purported author of a cycle of epic poems

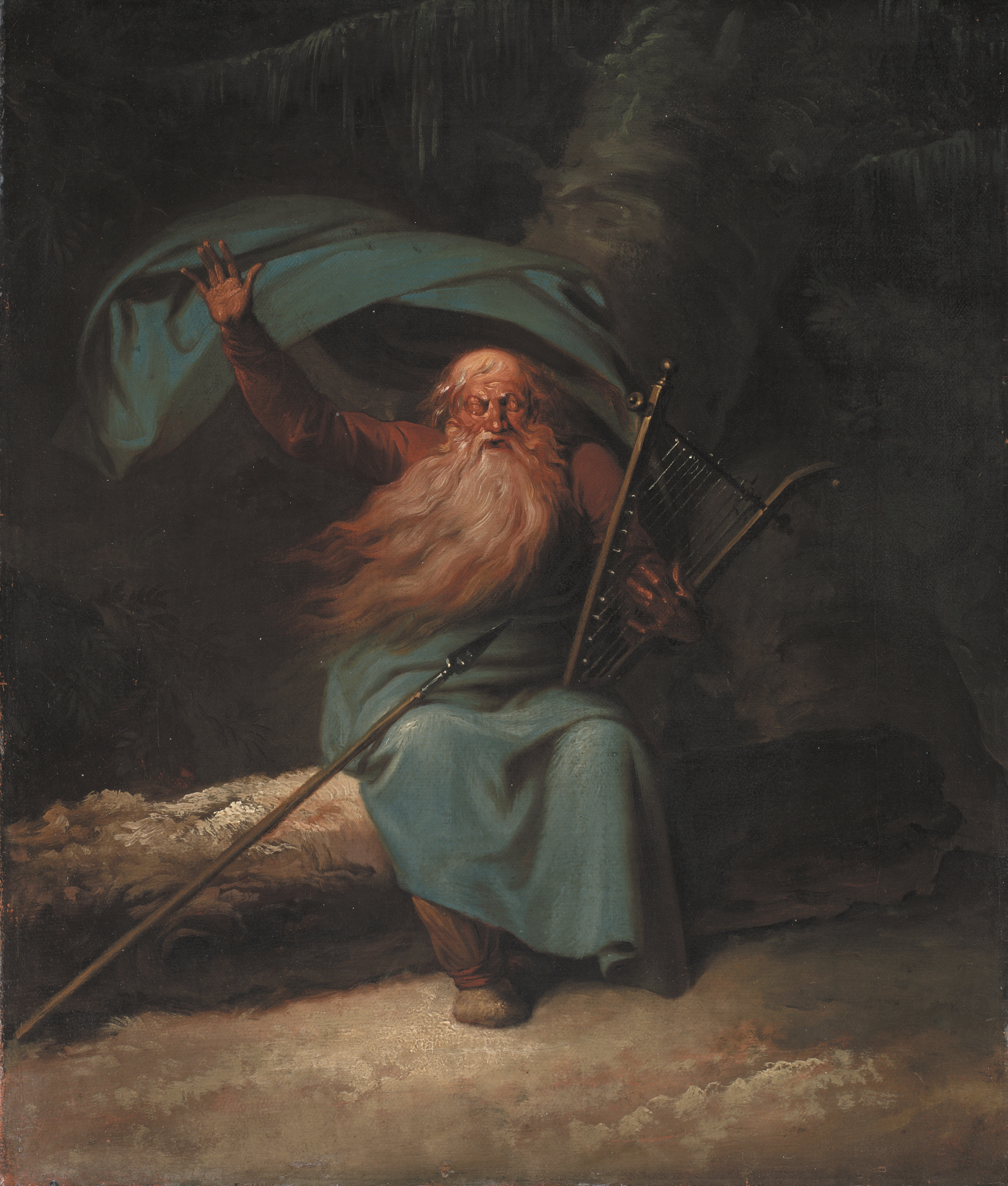
Ossian Singing, Nicolai Abildgaard, 1787

Ossian (/ˈɒʃən, ˈɒsiən/; Irish Gaelic/Scottish Gaelic: Oisean) is the narrator and purported author of a cycle of epic poems published by the Scottish poet James Macpherson, originally as Fingal (1761) and Temora (1763), and later combined under the title The Poems of Ossian. Macpherson claimed to have collected word-of-mouth material in Scottish Gaelic, said to be from ancient sources, and that the work was his translation of that material. Ossian is based on Oisín, son of Fionn mac Cumhaill (anglicised to Finn McCool), a legendary bard in Irish mythology. Contemporary critics were divided in their view of the work's authenticity, but the current consensus is that Macpherson largely composed the poems himself, drawing in part on traditional Gaelic poetry he had collected.

The work was internationally popular, translated into all the literary languages of Europe, and was highly influential both in the development of the Romantic movement and the Gaelic revival. Macpherson's fame was crowned by his burial among the literary giants in Westminster Abbey. W. P. Ker, in the Cambridge History of English Literature, observes that "all Macpherson's craft as a philological impostor would have been nothing without his literary skill."

== Poems ==
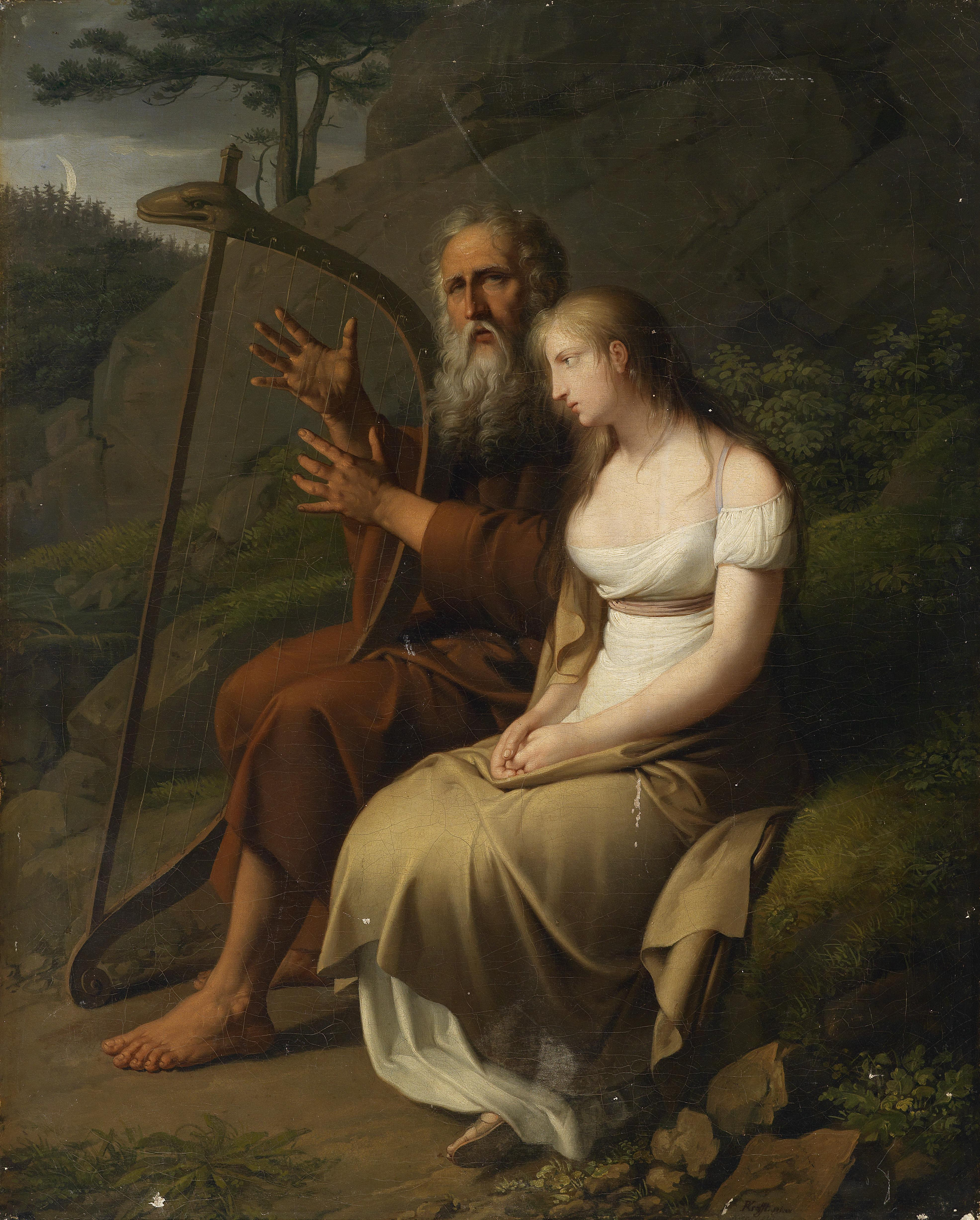
Ossian and Malvina, by Johann Peter Krafft, 1810.

In 1760, Macpherson published the English-language text Fragments of ancient poetry, collected in the Highlands of Scotland, and translated from the Gaelic or Erse language. Later that year, he claimed to have obtained further manuscripts and in 1761 he claimed to have found an epic on the subject of the hero Fingal (with Fingal or Fionnghall meaning 'fair stranger' denoting hair or eye colour), written by Ossian. According to Macpherson's prefatory material, his publisher, claiming that there was no market for these works except in English, required that they be translated. Macpherson published these alleged translations during the next few years, culminating in a collected edition, The Works of Ossian, in 1765. The most famous of these Ossianic poems was Fingal, written in 1761 and dated 1762.

The supposed original poems are translated into poetic prose, with short and simple sentences. The mood is epic, but there is no single narrative, although the same characters reappear. The main characters are Ossian himself, relating the stories when old and blind, his father Fingal (very loosely based on the Irish hero Fionn mac Cumhaill), his dead son Oscar (also with an Irish counterpart), and Oscar's lover Malvina (like Fiona a name invented by Macpherson), who looks after Ossian in his old age. Though the stories "are of endless battles and unhappy loves", the enemies and causes of strife are given little explanation and context.

Characters are given to killing loved ones by mistake, and dying of grief, or of joy. There is very little information given on the religion, culture or society of the characters, and buildings are hardly mentioned. The landscape "is more real than the people who inhabit it. Drowned in eternal mist, illuminated by a decrepit sun or by ephemeral meteors, it is a world of greyness." Fingal is king of a region of south-west Scotland perhaps similar to the historical kingdom of Dál Riata and the poems appear to be set around the 3rd century, with the "king of the world" mentioned being the Roman Emperor; Macpherson and his supporters detected references to Caracalla (d. 217, as "Caracul") and Carausius (d. 293, as "Caros", the "king of ships").

== Reception and influence ==
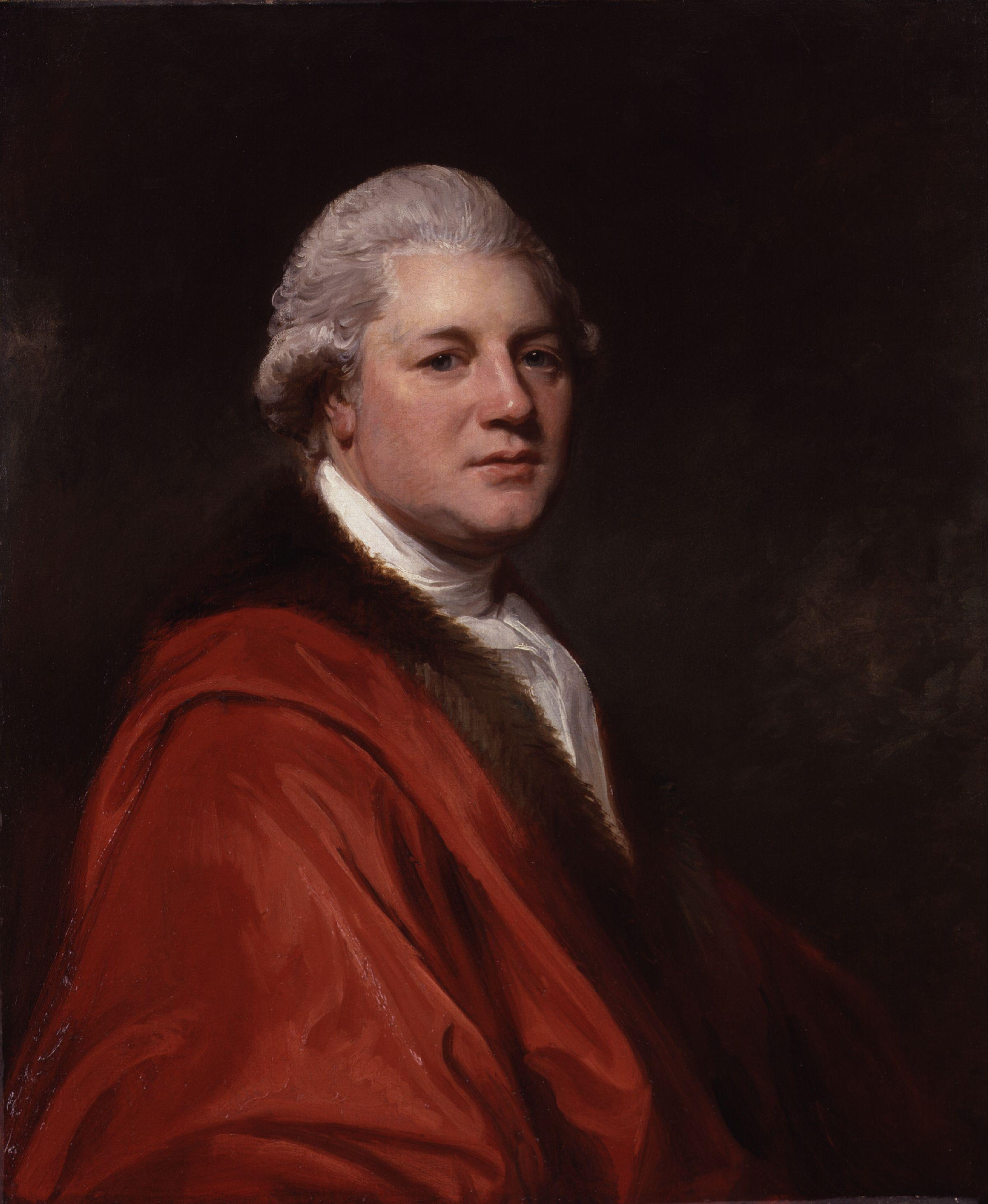
Portrait of James Macpherson by George Romney, 1780

The poems achieved international success. Napoleon and Diderot were prominent admirers, and Voltaire was known to have written parodies of them. Thomas Jefferson thought Ossian "the greatest poet that has ever existed", and planned to learn Gaelic so as to read his poems in the original. They were proclaimed as a Celtic equivalent of the Classical writers such as Homer. "The genuine remains of Ossian ... are in many respects of the same stamp as the Iliad", was Thoreau's opinion. Many writers were influenced by the works, including Walter Scott, and painters and composers chose Ossianic subjects.

The Hungarian national poet Sándor Petőfi wrote a poem entitled Homer and Ossian, comparing the two authors, of which the first verse reads:

Oh where are you Hellenes and Celts?
Already you have vanished, like
Two cities drowning
In the waters of the deep.
Only the tips of towers stand out from the water,
Two tips of towers: Homer, Ossian.

Despite its doubtful authenticity, the Ossian cycle popularized Celtic mythology across Europe, and became one of the earliest and most popular texts that inspired romantic nationalism over the following century. European historians agree that the Ossian poems and their vision of mythical Scotland spurred the emergence of enlightened patriotism on the continent and played a foundational role in the making of modern European nationalism.

The cycle had less impact in the British Isles. Samuel Johnson held it up as "another proof of Scotch conspiracy in national falsehood", while the Irish objected to what they saw as Macpherson's misappropriation of the Fenian Cycle of Irish mythology. David Hume eventually withdrew his initial support of Macpherson and quipped that he could not accept the claimed authenticity of the poems even if "fifty bare-arsed Highlanders" vouched for it. By the early 19th century, the cycle came to play a limited role in Scottish patriotic rhetoric.

== Authenticity debate ==
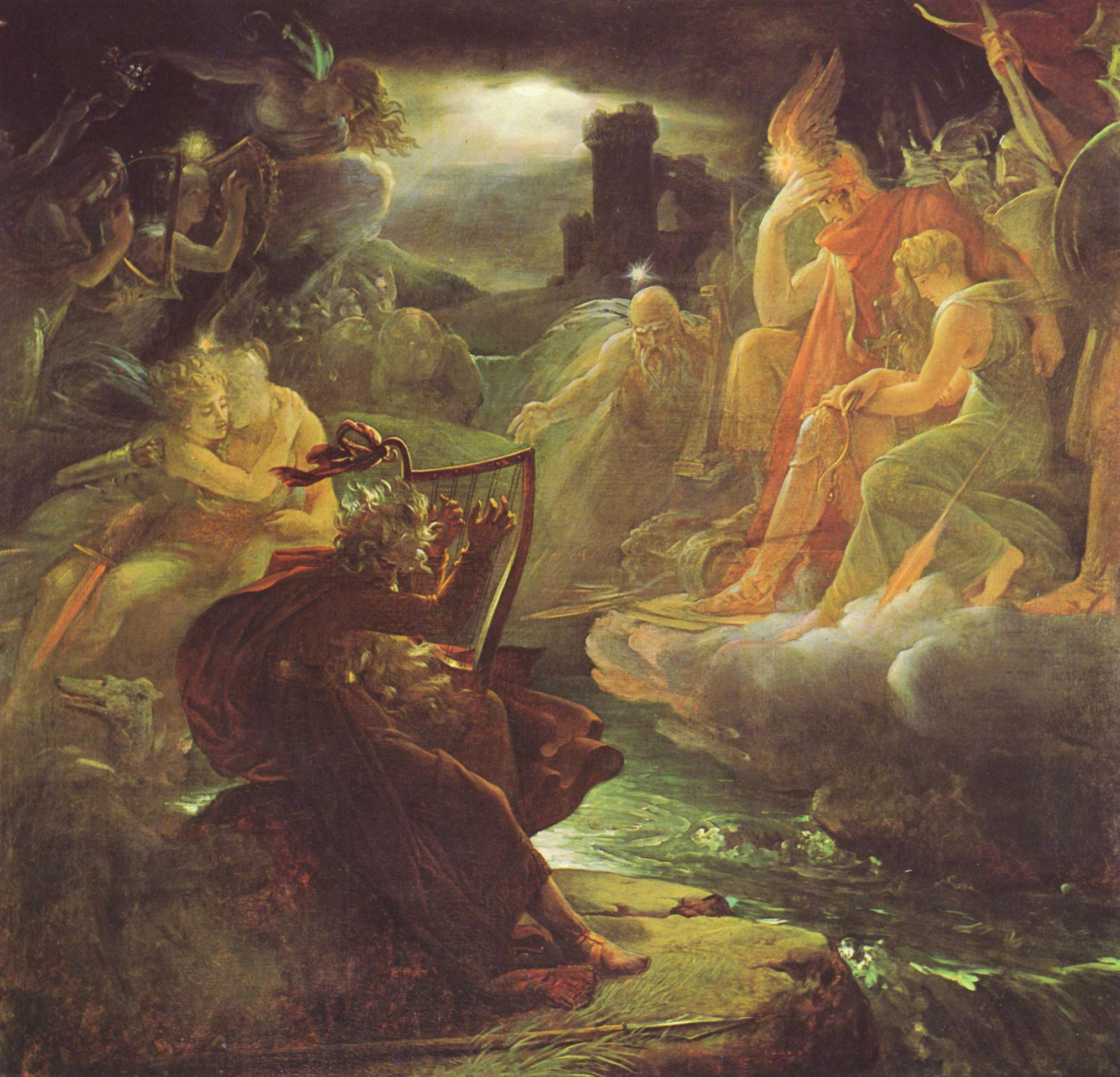
Ossian Evoking ghosts on the Edge of the Lora, by François Pascal Simon Gérard, 1801

There were immediate disputes of Macpherson's claims on both literary and political grounds. Macpherson promoted a Scottish origin for the material, and was hotly opposed by Irish historians who felt that their heritage was being appropriated. However, both Scotland and Ireland shared a common Gaelic culture during the period in which the poems are set, and some Fenian literature common in both countries was composed in Scotland.

Samuel Johnson, English author, critic, and biographer, was convinced that Macpherson was "a mountebank, a liar, and a fraud, and that the poems were forgeries". Johnson also dismissed the poems' quality. Upon being asked, "But Doctor Johnson, do you really believe that any man today could write such poetry?" he famously replied, "Yes. Many men. Many women. And many children." Johnson is cited as calling the story of Ossian "as gross an imposition as ever the world was troubled with". In support of his claim, Johnson also called Gaelic the rude speech of a barbarous people, and said there were no manuscripts in it more than 100 years old. In reply, it was proved that the Advocates' Library at Edinburgh contained Gaelic manuscripts 500 years old, and one of even greater antiquity.

In response, as his words were spoken during the 18th-century golden age of Scottish Gaelic literature, Dr Johnson swiftly found himself reviled in Gaelic satirical poetry by, among many others, James MacIntyre, the Clan MacIntyre tacksman of Glen Noe near Ben Cruachan, in "A Song to Dr Johnson" (Scottish Gaelic: Òran don Ollamh MacIain). Raonuill Dubh MacDhòmhnuill, the eldest son of Gaelic national poet Alasdair Mac Mhaighstir Alasdair and Clanranald tacksman of Laig, included MacIntyre's satire in the Gaelic poetry anthology called The Eigg Collection, which was published at Edinburgh in 1776.

Scottish author Hugh Blair's 1763 A Critical Dissertation on the Poems of Ossian upheld the work's authenticity against Johnson's scathing criticism and from 1765 was included in every edition of Ossian to lend the work credibility. The work also had a timely resonance for those swept away by the emerging Romantic movement and the theory of the "noble savage", and it echoed the popularity of Burke's seminal A Philosophical Enquiry into the Origin of Our Ideas of the Sublime and Beautiful (1757).

In 1766, antiquarian and Celticist Charles O'Conor, a descendant of the Gaelic nobility of Ireland, dismissed Ossian's authenticity in a new chapter Remarks on Mr. Mac Pherson's translation of Fingal and Temora that he added to the second edition of his seminal history. In 1775, he expanded his criticism in a new book, Dissertation on the origin and antiquities of the antient Scots.

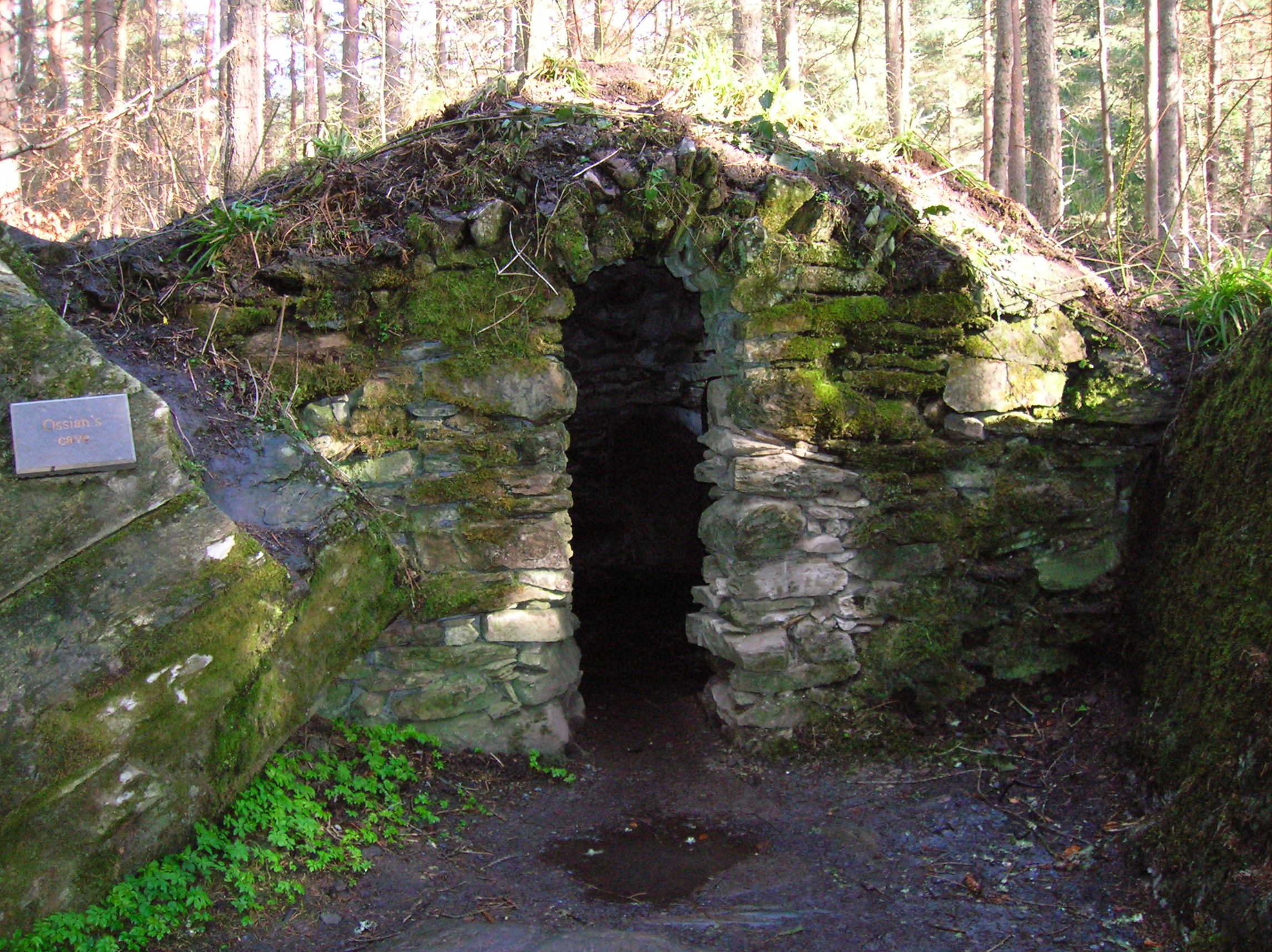
Ossian's Cave at The Hermitage in Dunkeld, Scotland

Faced with the controversy, the Committee of the Highland Society enquired after the authenticity of Macpherson's supposed original. It was because of these circumstances that the so-called Glenmasan manuscript (Adv. 72.2.3) came to light in the late 18th century, a compilation which contains the tale Oided mac n-Uisnig. This text is a version of the Irish Longes mac n-Uislenn and offers a tale which bears some comparison to Macpherson's "Darthula", although it is radically different in many respects. Donald Smith cited it in his report for the committee.

The controversy raged on into the early years of the 19th century, with disputes as to whether the poems were based on Irish sources, on sources in English, on Gaelic fragments woven into his own composition as Johnson concluded, or largely on Scots Gaelic oral traditions and manuscripts as Macpherson claimed. In the late 19th century, it was demonstrated that the only "original" Gaelic manuscripts that Macpherson produced for the poems were in fact translations of his work from English. During the same period, Peter Hately Waddell defended the authenticity of the poems, arguing in Ossian and the Clyde (1875) that the poems contained topographical references that could not have been known to Macpherson.

In 1952, the Scottish literary scholar Derick Thomson investigated the sources for Macpherson's work and concluded that Macpherson had collected genuine Scottish Gaelic ballads, employing scribes to record those that were preserved orally and collating manuscripts, but, as a pioneer of mythopoeia, had adapted often contradictory accounts of the same legends into a coherent plotline by altering the original characters and ideas, and had also introduced a great deal of his own.

According to historians Colin Kidd and James Coleman, Fingal (1761, dated 1762) was indebted to traditional Gaelic poetry composed in the 15th and 16th centuries, as well as to Macpherson's "own creativity and editorial laxity", while the second epic Temora (1763) was largely his own creation.

Nowadays, the work is considered a classic of found manuscript trope.

== Translations and adaptations ==
One poem was translated into French in 1762; by 1777, the whole corpus was translated. In the German-speaking states, Michael Denis made the first full translation in 1768–1769, inspiring the proto-nationalist poets Klopstock and Goethe, whose own German translation of a portion of Macpherson's work figures prominently in a climactic scene of The Sorrows of Young Werther (1774). Goethe's associate Johann Gottfried Herder wrote an essay titled Extract from a correspondence about Ossian and the Songs of Ancient Peoples (1773) in the early days of the Sturm und Drang movement.

Complete Danish translations were made in 1790, and Swedish ones in 1794–1800. In Scandinavia and Germany, the Celtic nature of the setting was ignored or not understood; instead, Ossian was regarded as a Nordic or Germanic figure who became a symbol for nationalist aspirations. In 1799, the French general Jean-Baptiste Bernadotte named his only son Oscar after the character from Ossian, at the suggestion of Napoleon, the child's godfather and an admirer of Ossian. Bernadotte later was made King of Sweden and Norway. In 1844, his son became King Oscar I of Sweden and Norway, who was, in turn, succeeded by his sons Charles XV and Oscar II (d. 1907). "Oscar" being a royal name led to its becoming also a common male first name, especially in Scandinavia but also in other European countries.

Melchiore Cesarotti was an Italian clergyman whose translation into Italian is said by many to improve on the original, and was a tireless promoter of the poems, in Vienna and Warsaw as well as Italy. It was his translation that Napoleon especially admired, and among others it influenced Ugo Foscolo, who was Cesarotti's pupil in the University of Padua.

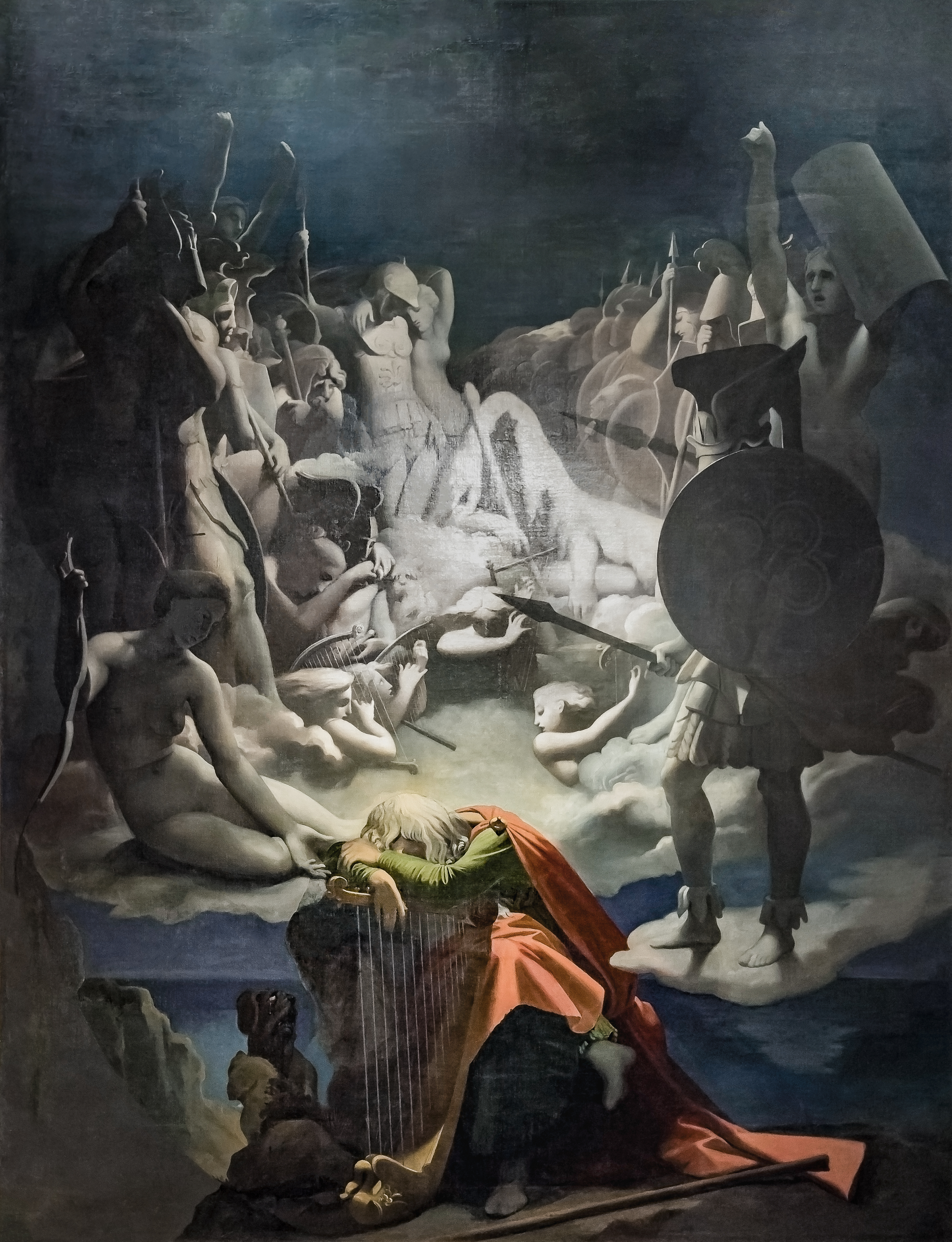
The Dream of Ossian, Jean Auguste Dominique Ingres, 1813

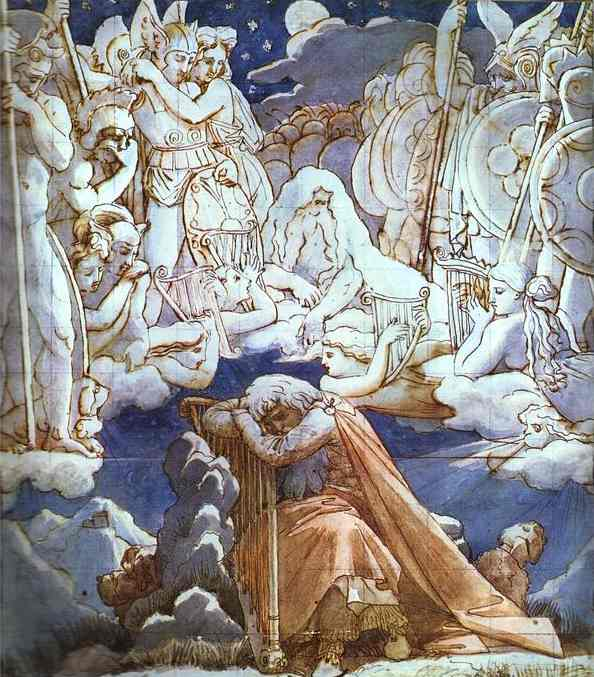
The Songs of Ossian, ink and watercolours, Ingres, 1811–13

British composer Harriet Wainwright premiered her opera Comala, based on text by Ossian, in London in 1792.

The first partial Polish translation of Ossian was made by Ignacy Krasicki in 1793. The complete translation appeared in 1838 by Seweryn Goszczyński.

By 1800, Ossian was translated into Spanish and Russian, with Dutch following in 1805, and Polish, Czech and Hungarian in 1827–1833. The poems were as much admired in Hungary as in France and Germany; Hungarian János Arany wrote "Homer and Ossian" in response, and several other Hungarian writers – Baróti Szabó, Csokonai, Sándor Kisfaludy, Kazinczy, Kölcsey, Ferenc Toldy, and Ágost Greguss, were also influenced by it.

The opera Ossian, ou Les bardes by Jean-François Le Sueur (with the famous, multimedial scene of "Ossian's Dream") was a sell-out at the Paris Opera in 1804, and transformed the composer's career. The poems also exerted an influence on the burgeoning of Romantic music, and Franz Schubert in particular composed Lieder setting many of Ossian's poems. In 1829 Felix Mendelssohn was inspired to visit the Hebrides and composed the Hebrides Overture, also known as Fingal's Cave. His friend Niels Gade devoted his first published work, the concert overture Efterklange af Ossian ("Echoes of Ossian") written in 1840, to the same subject.

== Gaelic studies ==
Macpherson's Ossian made a strong impression on Dugald Buchanan (1716–1768), a Perthshire poet whose celebrated Spiritual Hymns are written in a Scots Gaelic of a high quality that to some extent reflects the Classical Gaelic literary language once common to the bards of both Ireland and Scotland. Buchanan, taking the poems of Ossian to be authentic, was moved to revalue the genuine traditions and rich cultural heritage of the Gaels. At around the same time, he wrote to Sir James Clerk of Penicuik, the leading antiquary of the movement, proposing that someone should travel to the isles and western coast of Scotland and collect the work of the ancient and modern bards, in which alone he could find the language in its purity.

Much later, in the 19th and 20th centuries, this task was taken up by collectors such as Alexander Carmichael and Lady Evelyn Stewart Murray, and to be recorded and continued by the work of the School of Scottish Studies and the Scottish Gaelic Texts Society.

== In art ==
Subjects from the Ossian poems were popular in the art of northern Europe, but at rather different periods depending on the country; by the time French artists began to depict Ossian, British artists had largely dropped him. Ossian was especially popular in Danish art, but also found in Germany and the rest of Scandinavia.

=== Britain, Germany and Scandinavia ===
British artists began to depict the Ossian poems early on, with the first major work a cycle of paintings decorating the ceiling the "Grand Hall" of Penicuik House in Midlothian, built by Sir James Clerk, who commissioned the paintings in 1772. These were by the Scottish painter Alexander Runciman but were lost when the house burnt down in 1899, though drawings and etchings survive, and two pamphlets describing them were published in the 18th century. A subject from Ossian by Angelica Kauffman was shown in the Royal Academy Exhibition of 1773, and Ossian was depicted in Elysium, part of the Irish painter James Barry's magnum opus decorating the Royal Society of Arts, at the Adelphi Buildings in London (still in situ).

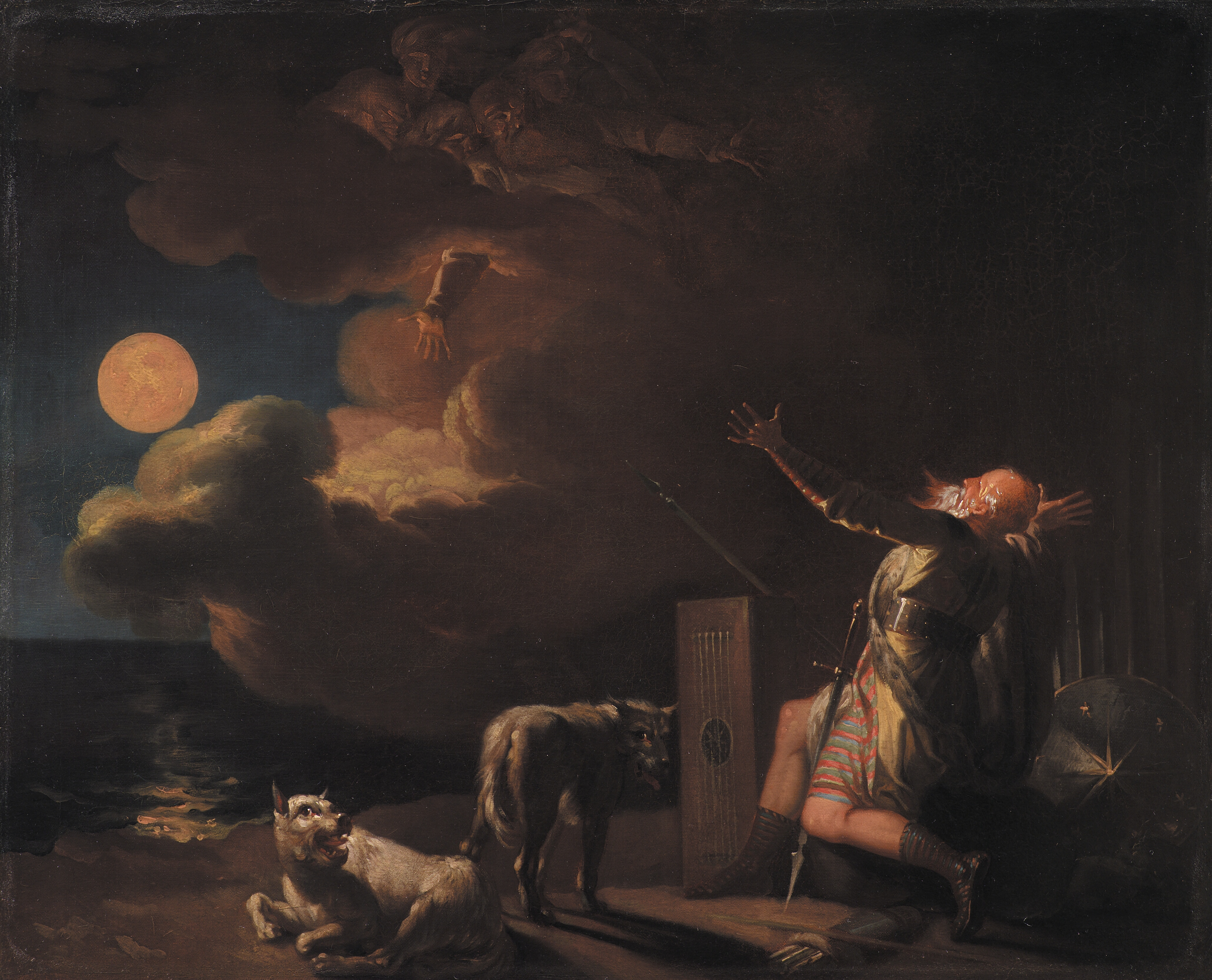
Fingal Sees the Ghosts of His Ancestors in the Moonlight, Nicolai Abildgaard, 1778

Works on paper by Thomas Girtin and John Sell Cotman have survived, though the Ossianic landscapes by George Augustus Wallis, which the Ossian fan August Wilhelm Schlegel praised in a letter to Goethe, seem to have been lost, as has a picture by J. M. W. Turner exhibited in 1802. Henry Singleton exhibited paintings, some of which were engraved and used in editions of the poems.

A fragment by Novalis, written in 1789, refers to Ossian as an inspired, holy and poetical singer.

The Danish painter Nicolai Abildgaard, director of the Copenhagen Academy from 1789, painted several scenes from Ossian, as did his pupils, including Asmus Jacob Carstens. His friend Joseph Anton Koch painted a number of subjects, and two large series of illustrations for the poems, which never got properly into print; like many Ossianic works by Wallis, Carstens, Krafft and others, some of these were painted in Rome, perhaps not the best place to evoke the dim northern light of the poems. In Germany the request in 1804 to produce some drawings as illustrations so excited Philipp Otto Runge that he planned a series of 100, far more than asked for, in a style heavily influenced by the linear illustrations of John Flaxman; these remain as drawings only. Many other German works are recorded, some as late as the 1840s; word of the British scepticism over the Ossian poems was slow to penetrate the continent, or considered irrelevant.

=== France ===
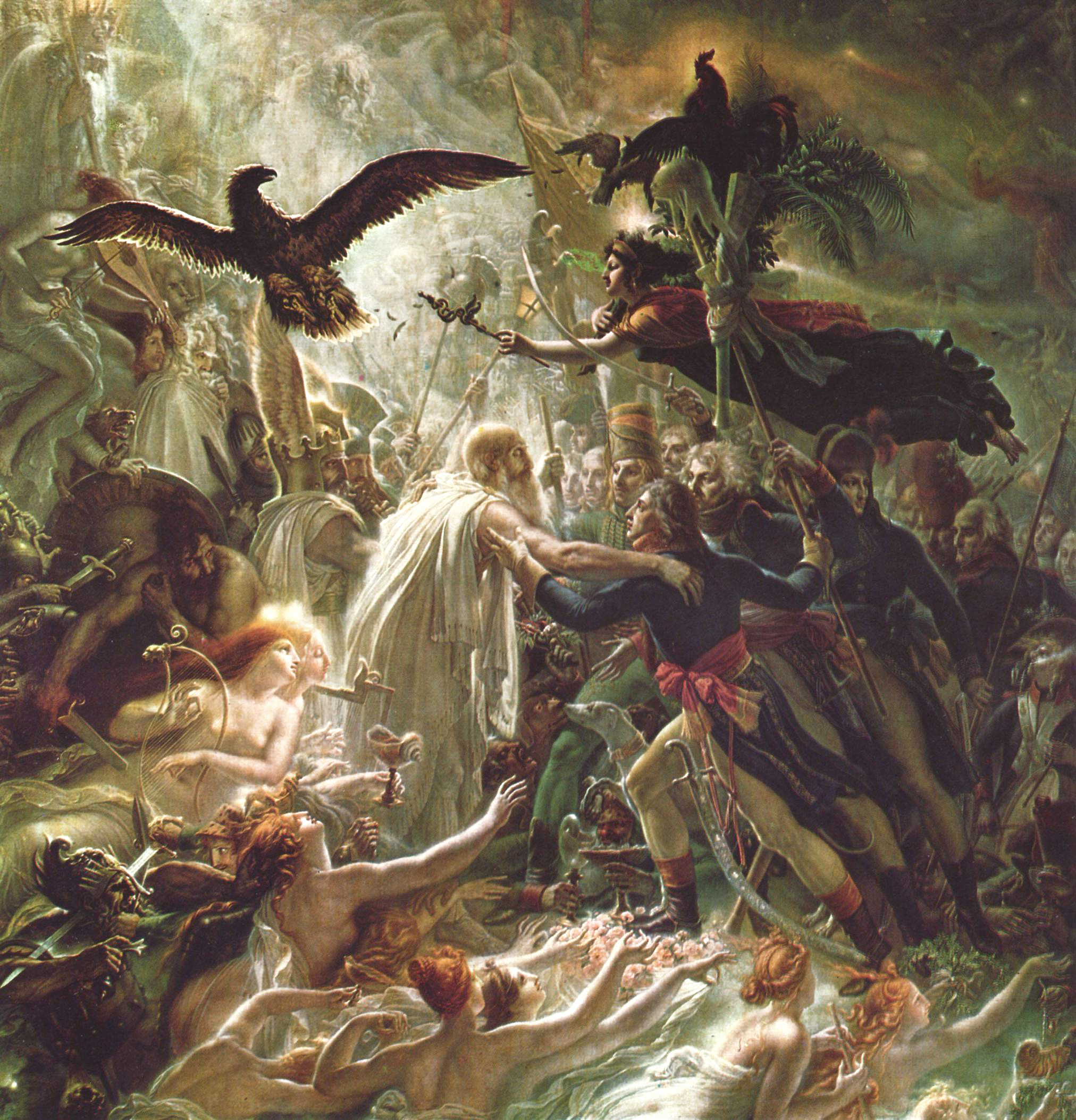
Ossian Receiving the Ghosts of Fallen French Heroes, Anne-Louis Girodet, 1805

In France, the enthusiasm of Napoleon for the poems accounts for most artistic depictions, and those by the most famous artists, but a painting exhibited in the Paris Salon of 1800 by Paul Duqueylar (now Musée Granet, Aix-en-Provence) excited Les Barbus ("the Bearded Ones"), a group of primitivist artists including Pierre-Maurice Quays (or Quaï) who promoted living in the style of "early civilizations as described in Homer, Ossian, and the Bible". Quays is reported as saying: "Homère? Ossian? ... le soleil? la lune? Voilà la question. En vérité, je crois que je préfère la lune. C'est plus simple, plus grand, plus primitif". ("Homer? Ossian? ... the sun? the moon? That's the question. Truthfully I think I prefer the moon. It's more simple, more grand, more primitive"). The same year, Napoleon was planning the renovation of the Château de Malmaison as a summer palace, and, though he does not seem to have suggested Ossianic subjects for his painters, two large and significant works were among those painted for the reception hall, for which six artists had been commissioned.

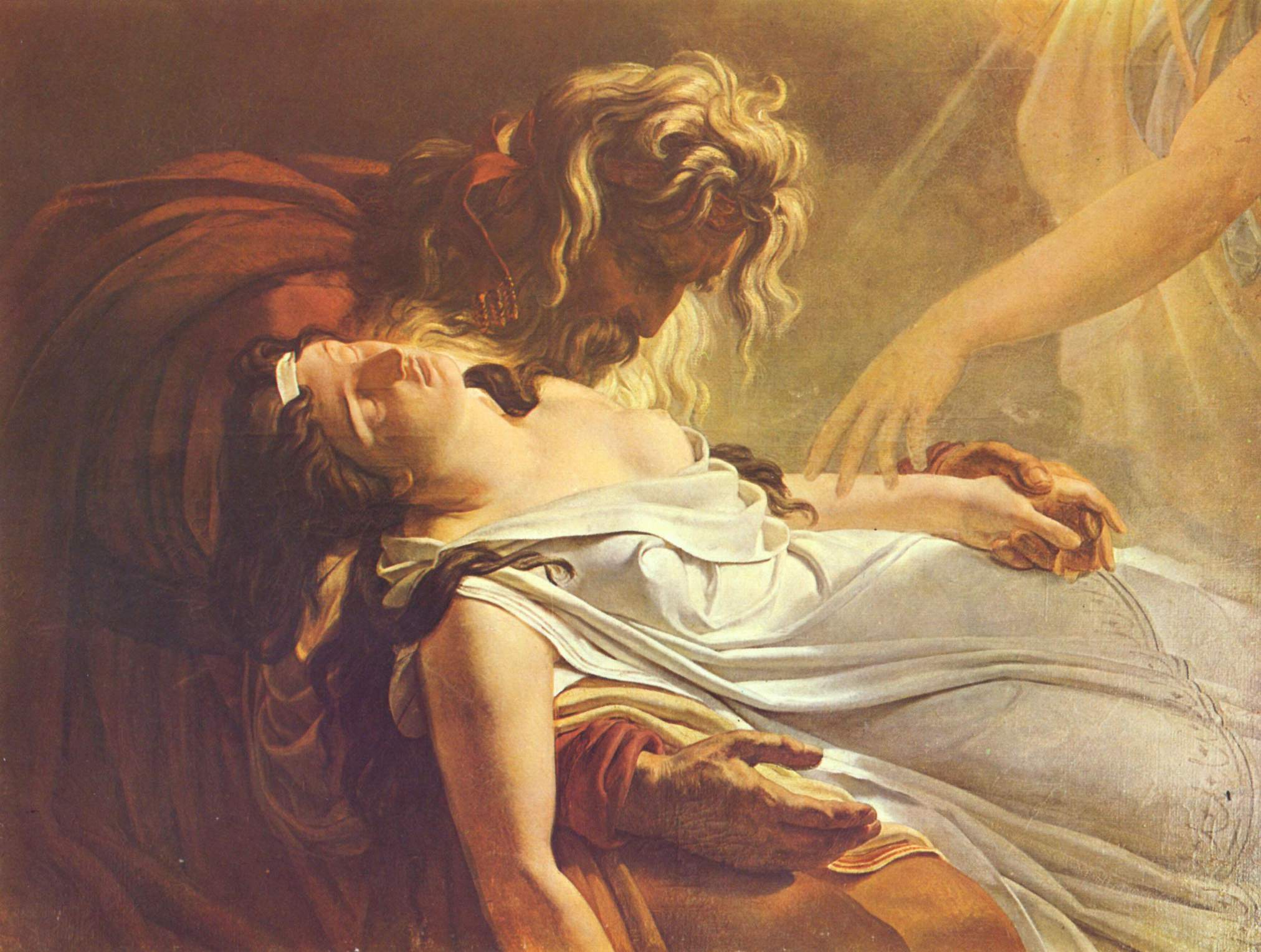
Malvina or The Death of Malvina, by Ary Scheffer (see literature), c. 1802, musée Auguste Grasset, Varzy

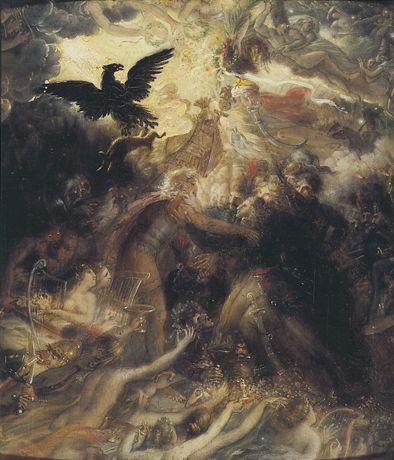
Study by Girodet for his Ossian painting, 1801, Louvre

These were Girodet's painting of 1801–02 Ossian receiving the Ghosts of the French Heroes, and Ossian Evoking ghosts on the Edge of the Lora (1801), by François Pascal Simon Gérard. Gérard's original was lost in a shipwreck after being bought by the King of Sweden after the fall of Napoleon, but survives in three replicas by the artist (a further one in Berlin was lost in 1945). One is now at Malmaison (184.5 × 194.5 cm / 72.6 × 76.6 in), and the Kunsthalle Hamburg has another (180.5 × 198.5 cm). A watercolour copy by Jean-Baptiste Isabey was placed as frontispiece to Napoleon's copy of the poems.

Duqueylar, Girodet and Gérard, like Johann Peter Krafft (above) and most of the Barbus, were all pupils of David, and the clearly unclassical subjects of the Ossian poems were useful for emergent French Romantic painting, marking a revolt against David's Neoclassical choice of historical subject-matter. David's recorded reactions to the paintings were guarded or hostile; he said of Girodet's work: "Either Girodet is mad or I no longer know anything of the art of painting".

Girodet's painting (still at Malmaison; 192.5 × 184 cm) was a succès de scandale when exhibited in 1802, and remains a key work in the emergence of French Romantic painting, but the specific allusions to the political situation that he intended it to carry were largely lost on the public, and overtaken by the Peace of Amiens with Great Britain, signed in 1802 between the completion and exhibition of the work. He also produced Malvina dying in the arms of Fingal (c. 1802), and other works.

Another pupil of David, Jean-Auguste-Dominique Ingres, was to depict Ossianic scenes over most of his long career. He made a drawing in 1809, when studying in Rome, and in 1810 or 1811 was commissioned to make two paintings, The Dream of Ossian and a classical scene, to decorate the bedroom Napoleon was to occupy in the Palazzo Quirinale on a visit to Rome. In fact the visit never came off and in 1835 Ingres repurchased the work, now in poor condition.

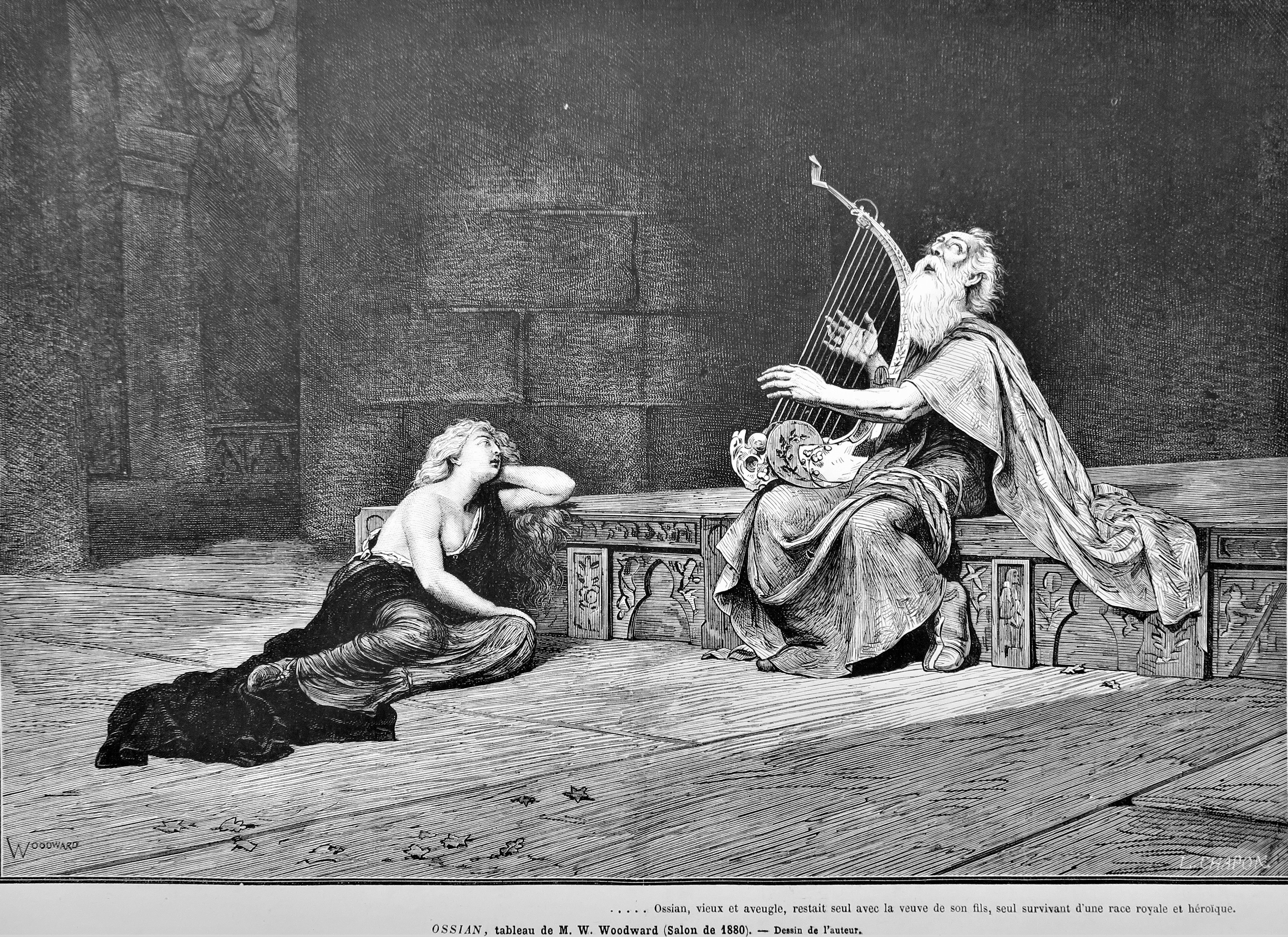
Wilbur Woodward, Ossian. Salon de 1880. Photo: Jamie Mulherron

The American painter based in Paris Wilbur Winfield Woodward exhibited an Ossian at the 1880 Salon.

== Editions ==
National Library of Scotland has 327 books and associated materials in its Ossian Collection. The collection was originally assembled by J. Norman Methven of Perth and includes different editions and translations of James Macpherson's epic poem 'Ossian', some with a map of the 'Kingdom of Connor'. It also contains secondary material relating to Ossianic poetry and the Ossian controversy. More than 200 items from the collection have been digitised.

Below are some other online editions of interest and recent works:

- 1760: Fragments of Ancient Poetry collected in the Highlands of Scotland, Edinburgh second edition.
- 1803: The Poems of Ossian in two volumes, an illustrated edition - Vol.I, Vol.II (London: Lackington, Allen and co.)
- 1887: Poems of Ossian: Literally translated from the Gaelic, in the original measure of verse by Peter McNaughton (Edinburgh: William Blackwood and Sons).
- 1888: Poems of Ossian translated by James Macpherson, a pocket reprint of the 1773 edition omitting the last four poems (London: Walter Scott)
- 1996: The Poems of Ossian and Related Works, ed. Howard Gaskill, with an Introduction by Fiona Stafford (Edinburgh University Press).
- 2004: Ossian and Ossianism, Dafydd Moore, a 4-volume edition of Ossianic works and a collection of varied responses (London: Routledge). This includes facsimiles of the Ossian works, contemporary and later responses, contextual letters and reviews, and later adaptations.
- 2011: Blind Ossian's Fingal : fragments and controversy, a reprint of the first edition and abridgement of the follow-up with new material by Allan and Linda Burnett (Edinburgh: Luath Press Ltd).
- 2021: Ossian: Warrior Poet, an edited and illustrated edition of the Poems with a new introduction and index by Scottish artist Eileen Budd (Windermere: Wide Open Sea Press).

== See also ==
- Ossian's Hall of Mirrors
- Folk process
- Romanticism
- Ossianic Society (Ireland)
- Vestiarium Scoticum
- Manuscripts of Dvůr Králové and of Zelená Hora
- Lord Dunsany
