= The Dream of Ossian =

Painting by Jean-Auguste-Dominique Ingres

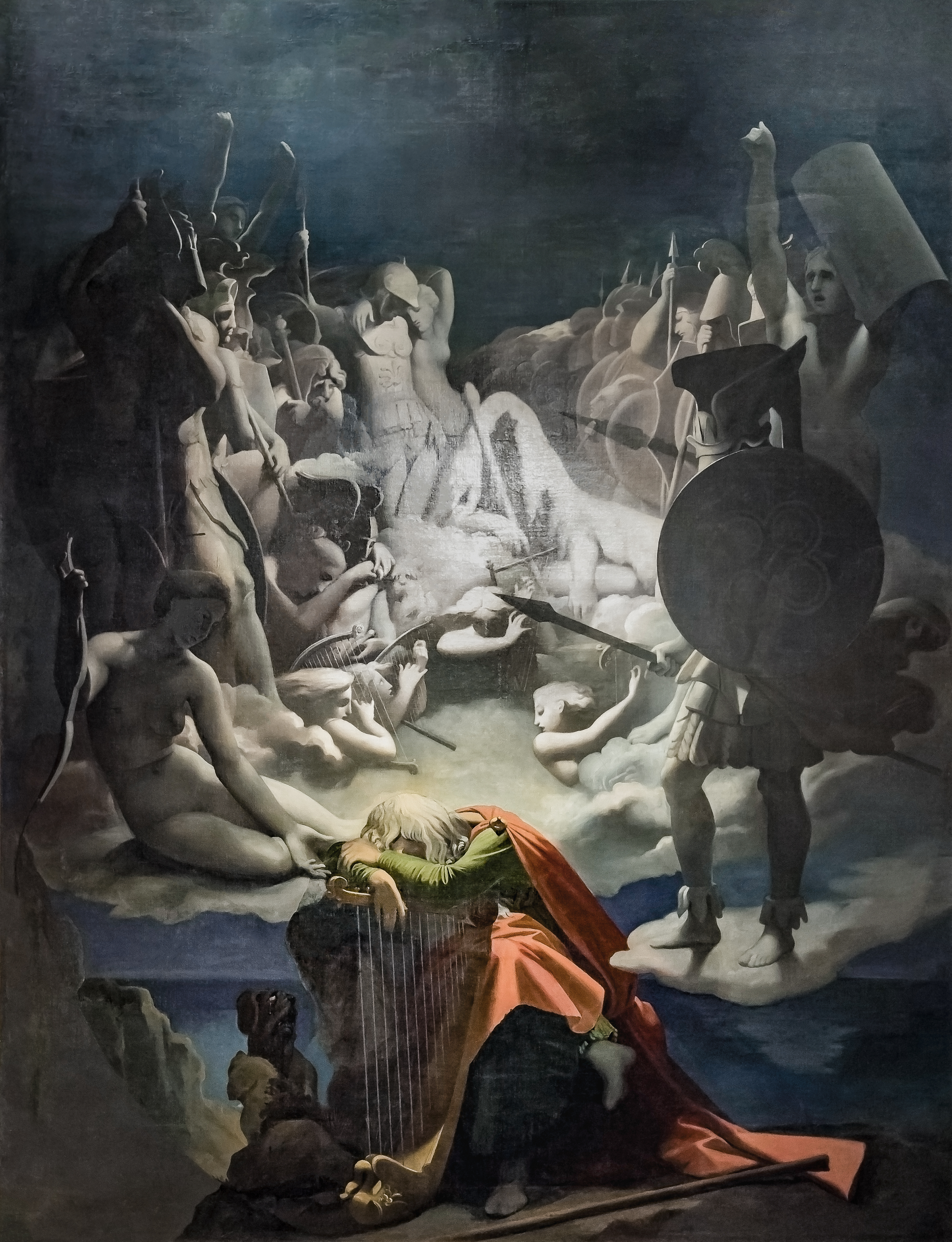
- Artist: Jean-Auguste-Dominique Ingres
- Year: 1813
- Medium: Oil on canvas
- Dimensions: 348 cm × 275 cm (137 in × 108 in)
- Location: Musée Ingres Bourdelle, Montauban, France

The Dream of Ossian (French: Le Songe d'Ossian) is an 1813 painting by the French artist Jean-Auguste-Dominique Ingres. The work depicts the legendary poet Ossian sleeping while he dreams of relatives, warriors and deities, which appear above him on the canvas. Ingres was influenced by his contemporaries' Ossianic works, including James Macpherson's purported translations of Ossian's poems, François Gérard's 1801 painting Ossian Evoking Phantoms, and Jean-François Le Sueur's 1803 opera Ossian, ou Les bardes.

The painting was intended for the French emperor Napoleon's bedroom in the Quirinal Palace in Rome, but was reacquired by Ingres in 1835. Unfinished compositional adjustments were made to the painting, and the work was bequeathed to the Musée Ingres upon the artist's death in 1867. Though subsequent criticism described the work as "grisaille" and "bizarre", others viewed the painting as characteristic of Neoclassicism or Romanticism.

== Description ==
Ossian is seated in the center foreground, dreaming while leaning on his harp. The poet is accompanied in the rocky landscape by a hound. The figures above Ossian are ghosts of the past and are part of his titular dream. The vision is framed on the right by Ossian's son Oscar bearing a spear and shield and on the left by a seated woman who holds a bow with one hand and extends the other towards Ossian. This figure has been interpreted by some to be Ossian's wife Evirallina and by others to be Oscar's wife Malvina. Behind this female figure is Ossian's father, Fingal, who leads a group of warriors, some of whom are embraced by naked women. In the center of the dream, four maidens play harps in the clouds before a seated and long-haired Snow King Starno.

The literary source of the painting's scene can be found in a passage in The War of Inisthona from James Macpherson's Poems of Ossian. The passage relates how Malvina's harp charms Ossian to sleep, during which he dreams of the past. The dreaming scene is also featured in Act IV, scene iii of the opera Ossian, ou Les bardes (English: Ossian, or The Bards), which contains descriptions of the armed warriors and their lovers that are likewise found in the painting. The inclusion of four harpists in the painting is another possible reference to the opera.

Ingres himself recorded the following about the scene's subject:

Ireland was the theater. On the last of Fingal's exploits, he solemnly consigned to Ossian his lance which had served him for the defense of the weak and oppressed. Then, deprived of his father and of his son Oscar, [who was] slain treacherously, blind and sick, he [Ossian] charmed his unhappiness and his misery by chanting of the exploits of his friends. He often crawled along the tomb of his son and father and there plucked with his trembling fingertips. The wife of dear Oscar, Malvina, never abandoned him; it was to her that he addressed the majority of his poems about the valiant Oscar ...

Beneath this, Ingres added some notes for the painting:

victory of Fingal over Caracalla / Noise of the torrential storm / ground, heather and deserted lands / Brilliant stars / the baying of hounds.

== History ==
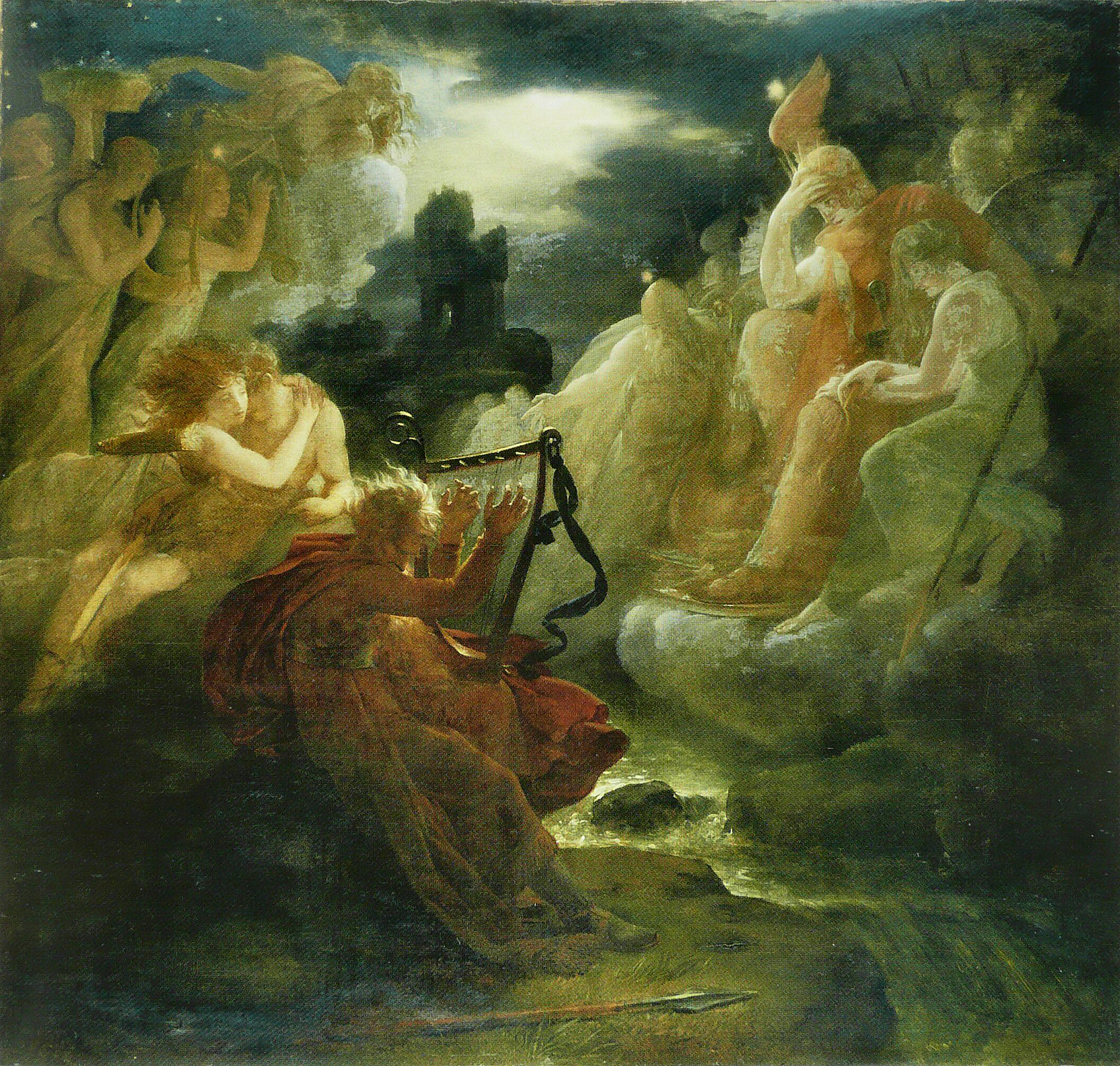
Ossian Evoking Phantoms (1801), François Gérard

The painting's subject Ossian purportedly was a blind Scottish poet who lived in the 3rd century CE. In the 1760s, James Macpherson published texts supposedly by Ossian, which Macpherson claimed to have rediscovered and translated from Gaelic into English. The translated works' success in Britain was followed by a spread of enthusiasm for Ossian throughout Europe. One of the poems was translated into French as early as 1762, and the collected works were translated in 1777. It was the Italian translation, however, by Melchiorre Cesarotti which the future French emperor Napoleon read. Napoleon became a fervent admirer of Ossian; it was even said that he carried a copy of Ossian's work into battle.

Though French artists turned to Ossian relatively late compared to the rest of Europe, Napoleon's patronage became a major incentive for many Ossianic works. In 1800, Napoleon commanded architects Charles Percier and Pierre-François-Léonard Fontaine to decorate his summer residence Château de Malmaison. In 1801, Percier and Fontaine in turn commissioned paintings from François Gérard and Anne-Louis Girodet, who both turned to Ossian as the subject for their paintings. Napoleon was also the dedicatee of the 1803 opera Ossian, ou Les bardes by Jean-François Le Sueur, and he attended the 1804 premiere.

Like Napoleon, Ingres was an admirer of Ossian, having made a drawing of The Dream of Ossian in 1809 while studying at the French Academy in Rome. Sometime between 1810 and 1812, Ingres was commissioned by the French Governor of Rome Miollis to create two large paintings for the formerly papal Quirinal Palace. One was intended for the empress Marie Louise's sitting room and the other was for the ceiling of emperor Napoleon's bedroom. For the former, Ingres painted Romulus' Victory Over Acron (French: Romulus vainqueur d’Acron) in 1812. For the latter, he completed The Dream of Ossian in 1813 on a canvas which was then affixed to the bedroom ceiling. The artist found inspiration in Gérard's 1801 painting Ossian Evoking Phantoms (French: Ossian évoque les fantômes) that was commissioned for Malmaison. Ingres was known to have had lithographs of Gérard's painting and had made sketches of its details. Some compositional choices may have also been influenced by the opera Ossian, ou Les bardes by Le Sueur, whom Ingres knew. Prior to completing The Dream of Ossian, Ingres had likely seen Le Sueur's opera, which was frequently performed between 1806 and 1811. Additionally, it has been posited that Ingres's figures and outline technique in studies for the painting were drawn from British artist John Flaxman's 1792 illustration The Council of the Gods.

Ingres made various versions of The Dream of Ossian, both before and after completing his 1813 painting. As of 1983, there were 9 existing drawings on the subject by Ingres. In 2021, these included an 1811 work in pencil and chalk in the Scottish National Gallery and a c. 1832–1834 watercolor drawing in the Harvard Art Museums.

Napoleon never used the bedroom for which The Dream of Ossian was intended. Following Napoleon's fall and around the time of disastrous French defeats in Italy, the painting was removed from the Quirinal Palace in 1815 and was likely sold. Ingres bought the painting back in 1835, with the intent of restoring it from its poor condition and possibly reselling the work. The painting was originally oval-shaped, but Ingres fitted it to a rectangular frame after repurchasing the work. He made several preparatory studies modifying the composition to its new frame before charging his pupil Raymond Balze with sketching in the changes. However, Balze's work was never completed, leaving some figures that appear to be doubled (such as the warrior with the lance on the left). Ingres bequeathed The Dream of Ossian to the Museum of Montauban (now the Musée Ingres Bourdelle) at his death in January 1867.

== Interpretation ==
The Dream of Ossian is considered a history painting, a genre to which the young Ingres desired to devote his career. Ossian offered a departure from the Greco-Roman Classicism, which dominated French art of the early 1800s. Yet, there are some reservations to the work's characterization as an anticlassicist history painting. The historical authenticity of Ossian was the subject of a contemporary debate, and the composition still features classical aspects such as the near-Roman style of armor worn by the warriors.

Scholars have drawn a number of connections between Ingres's The Dream of Ossian and Gérard's Ossian Evoking Phantoms. The art historian Robert Rosenblum even notes that the former is "clearly indebted" to the latter. In both Ingres's and Gérard's paintings, Ossian evokes ghosts and memories of the past which tower over him. There is also a potential parallel between Malvina (or Evirallina) in Ingres's depiction and the ghost of an old bard in Gérard's, since both figures are seen reaching out towards Ossian. Other similarities include the poet's dress, the harpists, and the embracing lovers. Conversely, there are also multiple contrasting elements. Gérard's Ossian calls for the ghosts willfully while Ingres's Ossian only dreams about them. Furthermore, the art writer Henry Okun described Gérard's painting as a "romantic frenzy", with movement present in the blowing winds and flowing stream; Ingres's painting by contrast was said to be "replete with neoclassic calm", featuring clouds and ghosts that have a "cement-like consistency".

In 1952, the art editor Thomas B. Hess saw The Dream of Ossian as "[having] all the emotional tone and sobbing fury that characterized the later appearance of Romantic painting." In her 1968 article on an Ingres exhibition at the Petit Palais, the English art historian Anita Brookner did not view the painting favorably. She described the depiction of the dream as "grisaille" and the painting as an Ingres work that must be "written off". In 2018, the anthropologist Peter Gow wrote that the work was an "extremely strange painting." He explained, "The young Ingres who painted The Dream of Ossian is either bizarrely reactionary or bizarrely prophetic. You don't know if it is simply a bad painting, harking back to the worst excesses of the Baroque, or a sort of precocious fumbling towards Cubism or even German Expressionist cinema."

== See also ==
- List of paintings by Jean-Auguste-Dominique Ingres
