= Francesco Galeani Napione =

Italian historian and writer (1748–1830)

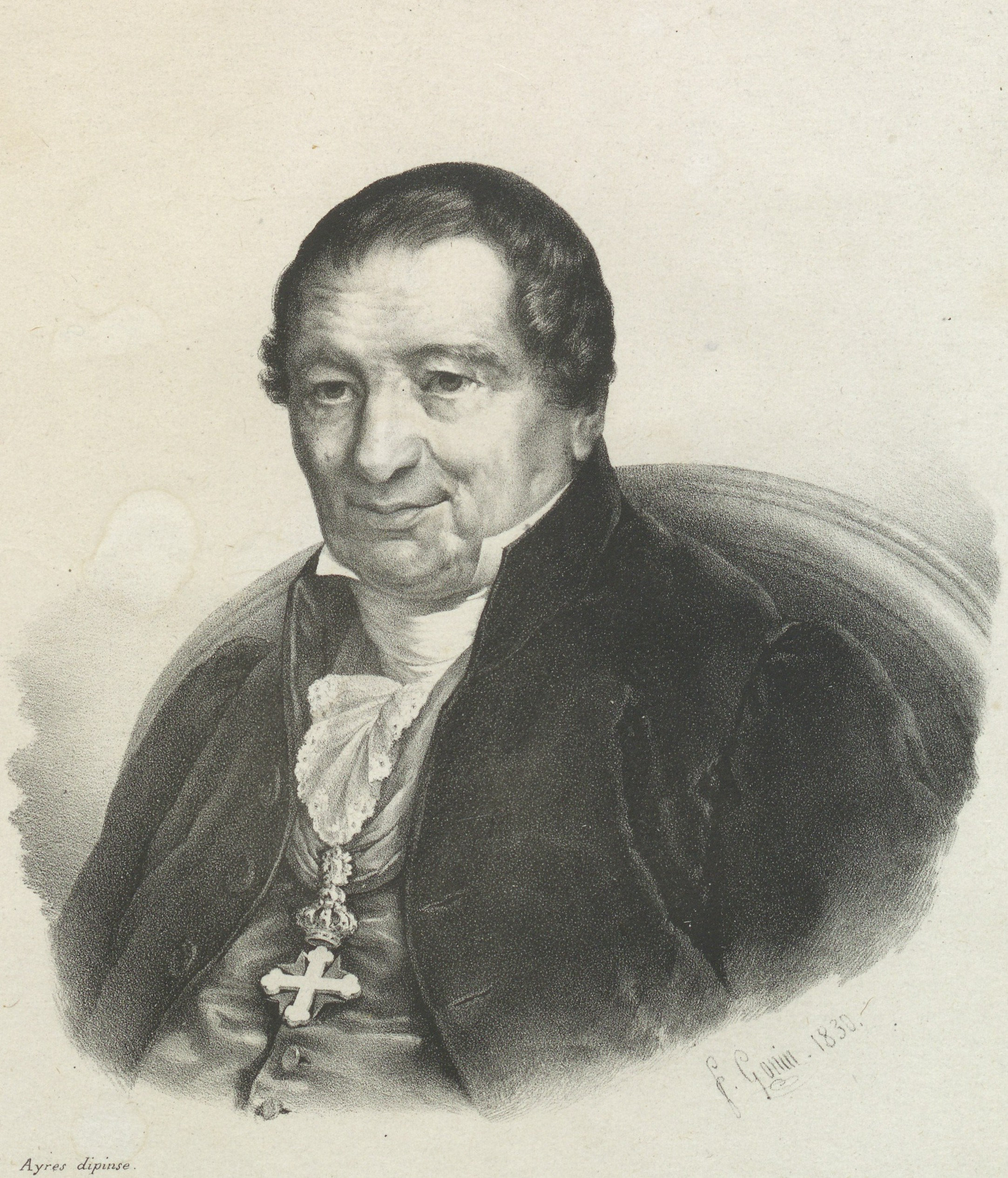
- Portrait of Gian Francesco Galeani Napione by Francesco Gonin, 1830
- Born: November 1, 1748; Turin, Kingdom of Sardinia
- Died: 12 June 1830 (aged 81); Turin, Kingdom of Sardinia
- Occupations: Historian; Intellectual; Civil Servant; Linguist
- Spouses: Luigia Crotti di Costigliole (m. 1786; died 1788) Barbara Lodi di Capriglio (m. 1792)
- Children: 6
- Parent(s): Carlo Giuseppe Amedeo Valeriano Napione and Maddalena Napione (née de Maistre)

Academic background
- Education: University of Turin
- Influences: Botero; Bettinelli

Academic work
- Discipline: History, Italian studies

Gianfrancesco Galeani Napione also noted as Francesco Galeani Napione, count of Cocconato (1 November 1748 – 12 June 1830) was an Italian historian, writer and senior civil servant who worked for the House of Savoy. He wrote prolifically on the most diverse subjects throughout his long life.

== Biography ==
Gian Francesco Galeani Napione, Count of Cocconato, was born in Turin, the son of Carlo Giuseppe Amedeo Valeriano and the Countess Maddalena de Maistre. He was a cousin-german of Joseph de Maistre.

Though inclined to historical and literary studies, he earned a degree in law at the University of Turin and, following the death of his father, held several high civil offices. In 1776 he was appointed intendant of the province of Susa and three years later of Saluzzo.

In the last years of the Ancien Régime Napione was a supporter of domestic liberal reforms. His salon became a centre for the discussion and spread of liberal ideas. Napione was an early promoter of Italy's unification. In 1773, he published the Saggio sopra l'arte storica, dedicated to Vittorio Amedeo III of Savoy, in which he advanced the idea of an Italian national consciousness. In 1780, he wrote the Osservazioni intorno al progetto di pace tra S.M. e le potenze barbaresche, where he proposed the formation of a confederation of maritime Italian states under the auspices of the Papal States.

After the annexation of Piedmont to France, Napione remained faithful to the House of Savoy and abandoned active politics, devoting himself to the study of Italian history and literature. Opposed to French expansionism, his writings promoted the House of Savoy as the leaders of the Italian states.

In 1801 he became a member of the Academy of Sciences of Turin. In 1812 he was elected a member of the new Accademia della Crusca. In 1814, after the Restoration, he took part in the reform of the University of Turin. He died in Turin in 1830.

== Works ==
A highly cultivated man, he left several literary and historical writings, in prose and verse, including his most famous work, Dell'uso e dei pregi della lingua italiana (On the Use and Merits of the Italian Language, 2 vols., 1791), on the necessity of using the sole Italian language in the entire Kingdom of Sardinia. The work was addressed particularly to the Piedmontese, but its arguments applied easily to Italy as a whole, and it was read throughout the peninsula.

Galeani Napione perceived clearly the interrelation between language and national feeling. He felt that for a people to have its own language, to cultivate, love, appreciate, and use it in formal, pompous occasions no less than in familiar or fashionable gatherings was one of the bonds uniting men in a common interest for their country. Such an interest would help to impress in their hearts a new feeling for the nation, resulting first in a greater awareness of the public welfare in the country as a whole, and secondly in an intimate and strong political unity. The mother-tongue was the most important among the many ties uniting citizens. It brought back instantly and forcibly all the most pleasant memories connected with one's country. Nations which used more than one language concurrently or cultivated the study of foreign and ancient tongues corrupted their patriotic genius, feeling, and character. Anyone preferring a foreign language to his own, renounced his native land and adopted the customs, ideas, and opinions of the country whose language he affected. This was the core of Galeani Napione's work; it expresses the genuine sense of nationhood which had been slowly developing during the entire century. In line with his practical outlook, Galeani Napione wanted to forbid the use of both Latin and French. If Latin continued to be spoken among the learned, French by the cultured and fashionable, Italian would remain "the language of the uncouth, idiotic, and plebeian element." Culture would then never spread, and the masses would "remain boorish and uncontrollable." This was essentially the argument advanced by Genovesi for the recognition of Italian as the language of instruction in schools.

Galeani Napione was against the Crusca and against Cesarotti. A contradiction appears here, for after castigating Cesarotti's admiration for the French, Galeani Napione proceeds to suggest the introduction of French terms when Italian words are lacking. Despite all previous debate, Galeani Napione felt that every dialect should have the right to contribute terms to the common language, provided they were understood or easily understandable throughout Italy. Essentially Galeani Napione gave a history of Italian and of the opinions concerning it. He questioned Bouhours (after more than a hundred years the criticism still rankled) and accused him of misplaced patriotism. Moreover, he listed all great and lesser authors who had written in Italian and who attained fame and honor beyond the frontiers of Italy. He thus proved to his satisfaction that Italian was not inferior to any other language, living or dead.

== List of works ==
- Saggio sopra l'Arte storica. Turin: dal Mairesse. 1773.
- "Elogio di Giovanni Botero". Elogi Italiani. IX. Venice: P. Marcuzzi. 1782.
- La Griselda. Tragedia. Turin: presso Giammichele Briolo stampatore e libraio della Reale Accademia delle Scienze. 1785.
- Discorso intorno alla Storia del Piemonte. Turin: presso i librai Gaetano Balbino, e Francesco Prato in Doragrossa. 1791.
- Dell'uso e dei pregi della lingua italiana libri tre. Turin. 1791.
- Le Tusculane di Cicerone tradotte in lingua italiana con alcuni opuscoli del traduttore. Florence: presso Molini Landi e C. 1805.
- Della patria di Cristoforo Colombo. Florence: presso Molini, Landi e comp. 1808.
- "Lettera a Francesco Benedetti sul merito dell'Alfieri poeta tragico". Giornale di Letteratura e Belle Arti (11–12). 1818.
- Monumenti dell'Architettura antica. Lettere al conte Giuseppe Franchi di Pont. Pisa: presso Niccolò Capurro co' caratteri di F. Didot. 1820.
- "Idea di una confederazione delle potenze d'Italia". Storia della Monarchia Piemontese Dal 1773 al 1861. II. Turin: Fratelli Bocca: 527–548. 1878.
