= Romulus' Victory Over Acron =

Painting by Jean-Auguste-Dominique Ingres

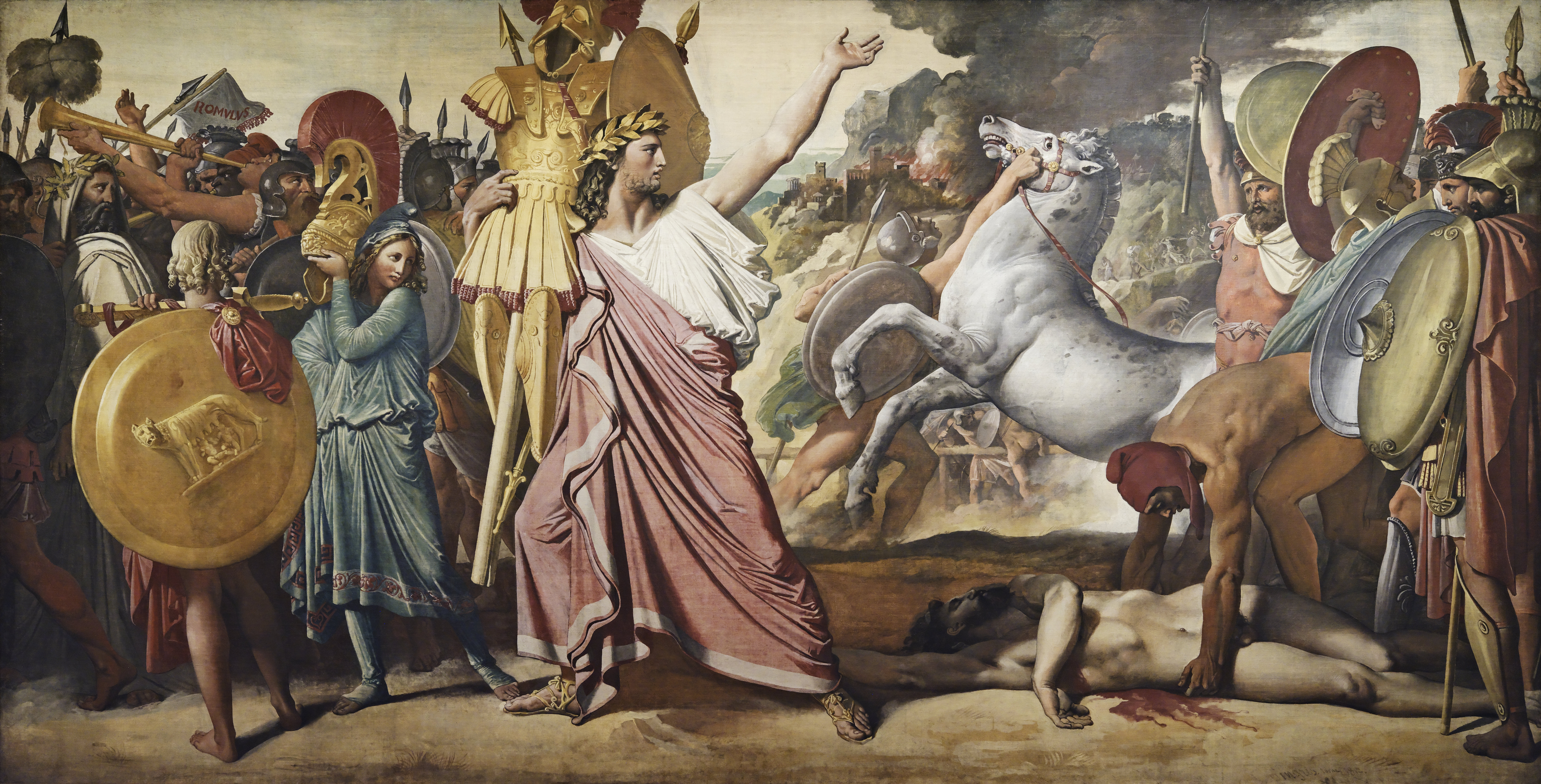
Romulus' Victory Over Acron, 1812, tempera on canvas, 276 x 530cm, "Romulus, then, after making a vow that if he should conquer and overthrow his adversary, he would carry home the man's armour and dedicate it in person to Jupiter, not only conquered and overthrew him, but also routed his army in the battle which followed, and took his city as well" Plutarch, Lives. Romulus.

Romulus' Victory Over Acron (Romulus, Conqueror of Acron) is a painting completed in 1812 by the French Neoclassical artist Jean-Auguste-Dominique Ingres. Ingres' source for this subject comes from Plutarch's Life of Romulus. The painting depicts the war that resulted from the Roman abduction of the young Sabine women in an effort to remedy the shortage of women in the newly founded city of Rome. In retaliation Acron, the king of the neighbouring tribe, the Caeninenses, declared war upon the Romans. He and his tribesmen were mercilessly defeated and their city sacked by the Romans.

== Style and composition ==
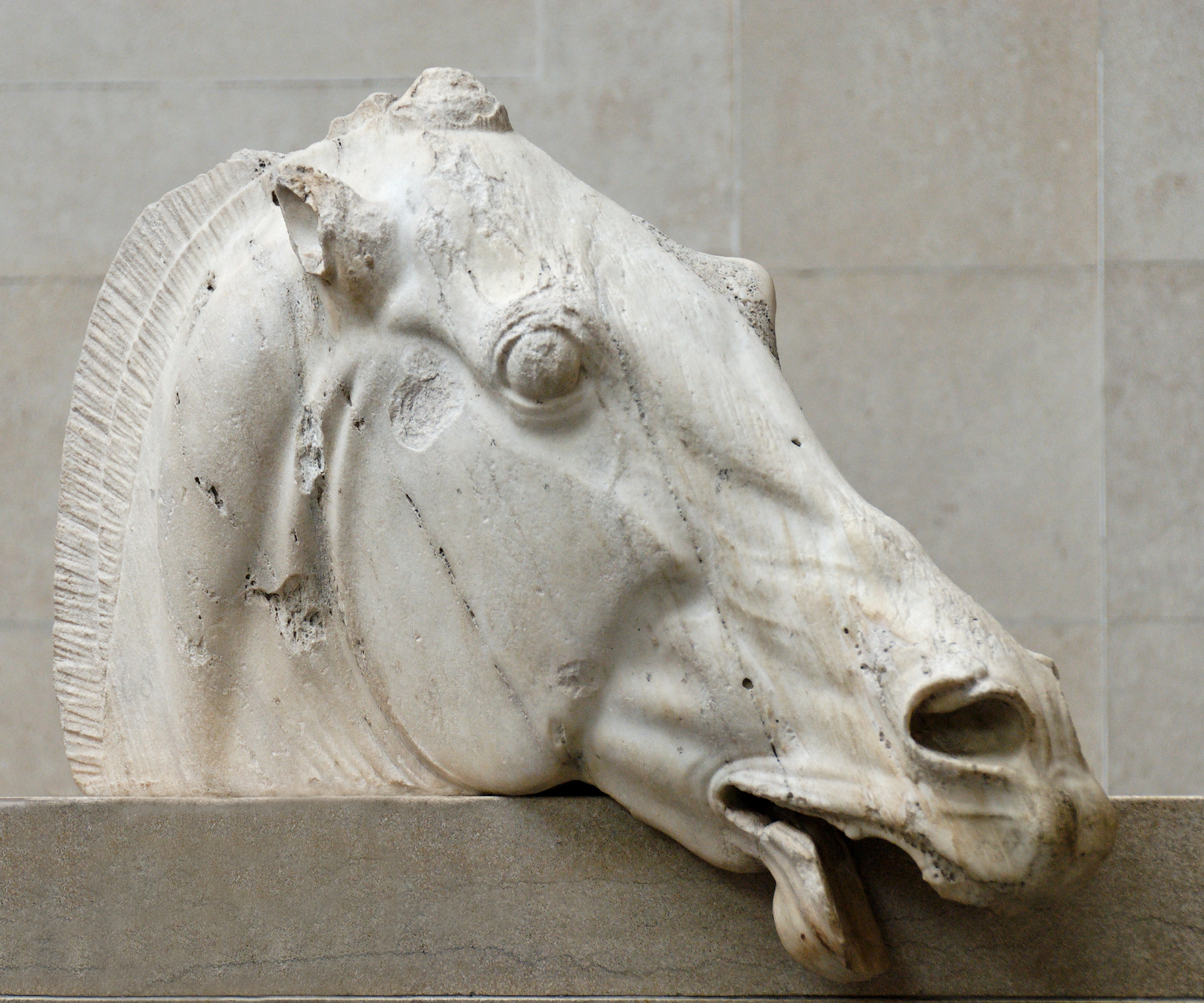
Head of a horse of Selene from the east pediment of the Parthenon. Acropolis, Athens, 438–432 BC

The subject, style and size of the piece make it clear that this piece embodies the Neoclassical tradition. At 276 x 530cm it is one of Ingres’ largest paintings and this grand scale is consistent with his previous classical subject paintings, such as Jupiter and Thetis. The canvas is cast in the form of a long frieze, a style traditional of the ancient world. Ingres introduces several motifs from ancient art; the horse for example is a clear homage to the marble horse of the Parthenon frieze. Ingres also uses tempera to evoke the matte quality of ancient Roman frescos.

In the painting there is an element of stunted action which creates a somewhat icy and unemotional aspect which is a feature of the new Gothic style that was emerging forcefully in the early 19th century.

== Influences ==
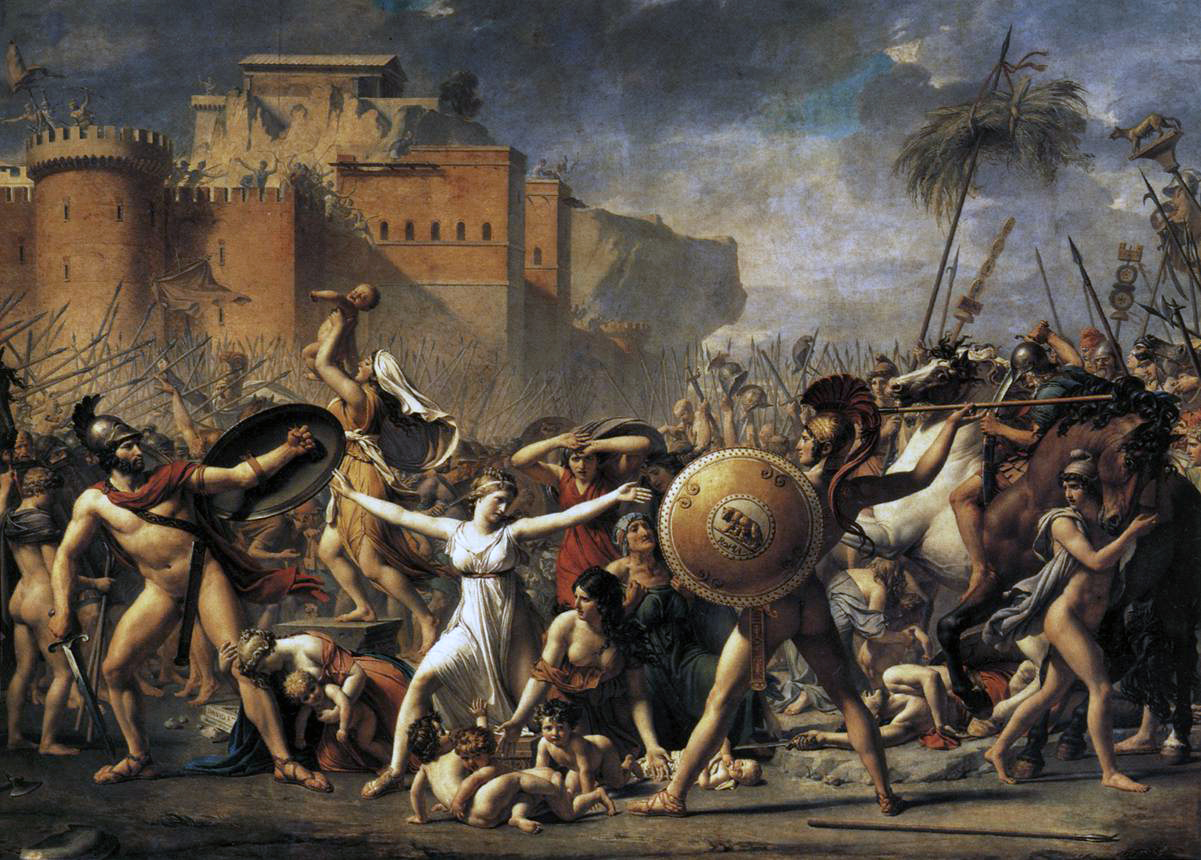
Jacques-Louis David, The Intervention of the Sabine Women, 1799

It is not just from the ancient world that Ingres took his inspiration. Elements of the painting recall the work of Jacques-Louis David, Europe's leading painter at the turn of the century and Ingres' master with whom he studied for four years. Romulus' Victory Over Acron has several points of similarity with David's The Intervention of the Sabine Women of 1799. The figure of Ingres' slain Acron closely matches that of his master's dead Sabine. The shield, depicting the she-wolf and infant twins Romulus and Remus characteristic of the Roman foundation myth, is also the same save that Ingres omitted the inscription. The warrior to the extreme left of the Sabines, whose stance derives from the antique, finds a fairly confirming echo in Ingres' victorious Romulus. It has also been suggested that the pose of Romulus was inspired by a fragment of a Roman bas-relief after a work by Phidias, a classical Greek sculptor.

== Commissioning and history ==
The painting—together with The Dream of Ossian—was commissioned by General de Miollis in 1811 for Napoleon Bonaparte's residence, the Palazzo Monte Cavallo (now the Palazzo Quirinale) and was intended as decoration of the empress's second salon. In 1815 the Romulus was taken out of the Quirinale and brought to the Palazzo di San Giovanni in Laterano. In 1857 it was given by Pope Pius IX to Napoleon III who presented it to the Ecole des Beaux-Arts, where it was hung in the Amphithéatre d'Honneur, until 1969 when it was deposited at the Louvre. In January 2017 it returned to the Ecole des Beaux-arts for restoration before being re-installed in the newly restored Amphithéatre d'Honneur (May 2017).

== See also ==
- List of paintings by Jean-Auguste-Dominique Ingres

== Bibliography ==
- Daniel Ternois, Ingres, Paris, Fernand Nathan, 1980 (ISBN 2-09-284-557-8)
- Robert Rosenblum, Ingres, Paris, Cercle d'Art, coll. « La Bibliothèque des Grands Peintres », 1986 (ISBN 2-7022-0192-X)
