= Domenico Conti Bazzani =

Italian painter

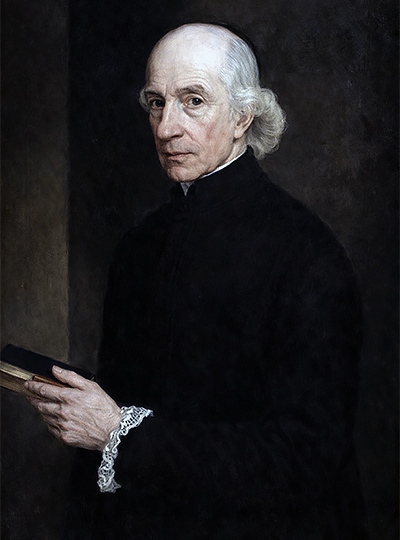
Portrait of Saverio Bettinelli by Conti

Domenico Maria Conti or Conti Bazzani (or Bazzano/Bozani; 1740 – 19 February 1815) was an Italian painter, bridging Rococo and Neoclassical styles. He is described as a disciple, and adoptive son of Giuseppe Bazzani, who was director of the Academy of Mantua after 1767.

== History ==
He studied in the Academy of his native Mantua under Bazzani, and was awarded gold medals in competitions in 1765 and 1766. In 1769, his essay on a young Scipio Africanus was also awarded gold medals, but he did not accept a title of master, but a position teaching figure painting. Among his works in Mantua, he painted in the Royal Palace and in the church of San Zenone. The Jesus Nazarene in the Cathedral was painted during his stay in Rome.

In 1770, Conti moved to Rome, where he found papal patronage, trained with Pompeo Batoni, and was able to establish an active studio. Among his pupils were Giuseppe Tominz and Giuseppe Bossi. It is reputed that Vincenzo Camuccini and Pietro Benvenuti also frequented his studio. He completed some portraits. He is known in later years for serving as a merchant or appraiser for the exportation of paintings from Rome.
