= Angelo Mazza =

Italian Neoclassical poet

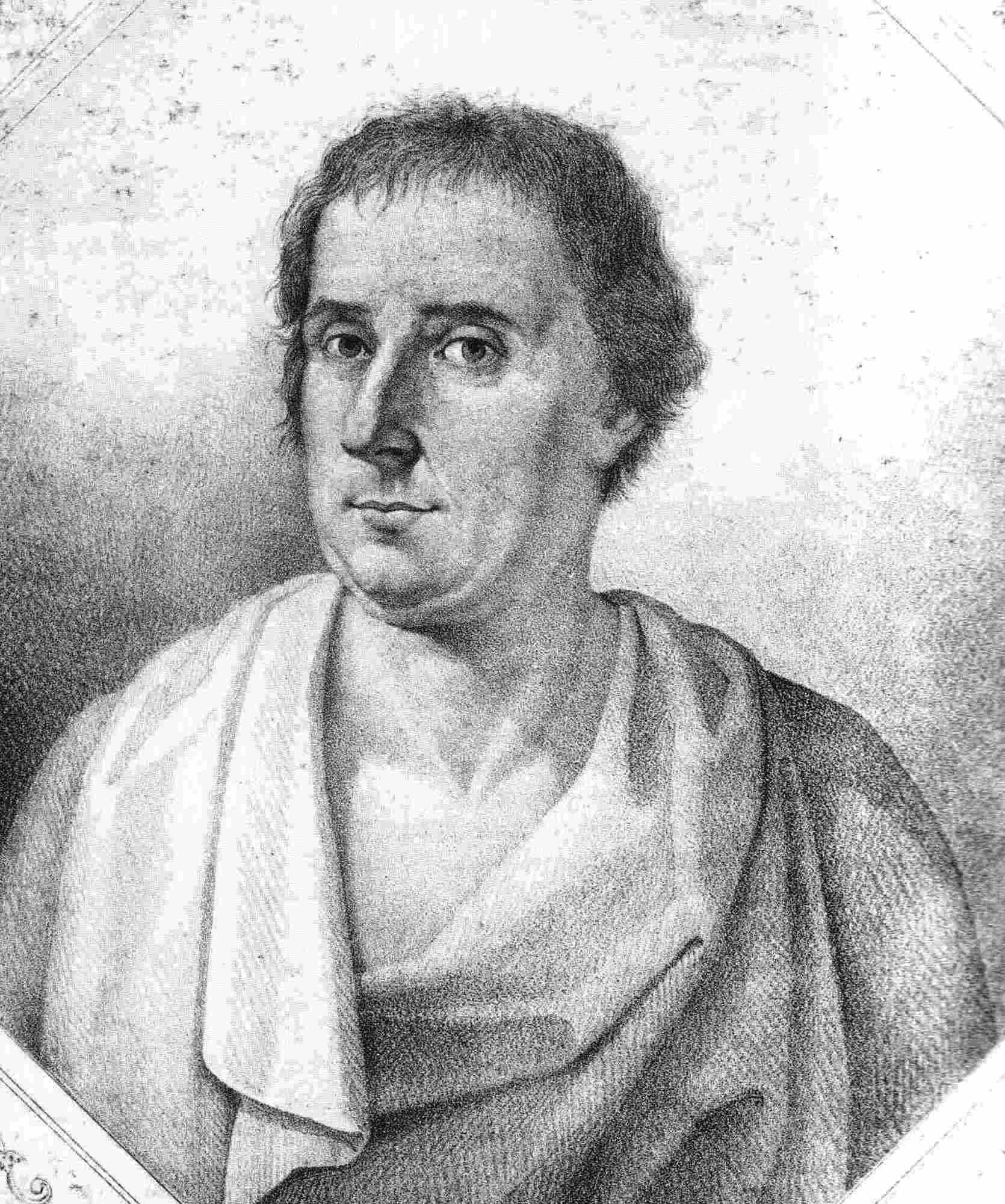
- Portrait by Tiziano Marcheselli, c. 1790
- Born: 16 November 1741; Parma, Duchy of Parma and Piacenza
- Died: 11 May 1817 (aged 75); Parma, Duchy of Parma and Piacenza
- Education: University of Padua
- Occupations: Poet, classical scholar
- Employer: University of Parma
- Spouse: Caterina Stocchi (m. 1775)
- Children: 3

Angelo Mazza (16 November 1741 – 11 May 1817) was an Italian neoclassical poet, and classical scholar.

== Biography ==
Angelo Mazza was born at Parma on 16 November 1741. He became Professor of Greek in the University of his native town. As a poet, he belonged to the group of Italian men of letters who fell under the spell of the English eighteenth-century classical school of poetry. He derived themes such as the power of music from English literature, to which he was introduced by his teacher and friend Cesarotti. He subsequently translated and imitated English poets, notably Akenside, Dryden, Mason, Pope, Gray, and Thomson. His example left its mark on Foscolo and other poets of the next generation. Mazza was a prominent member of the Academy of Arcadians, with the pseudonym Armonide Elideo.

== Sources ==
- Lindon, J. (2002). "Mazza, Angelo". The Oxford Companion to Italian Literature. Oxford University Press. ISBN 978-0-19-818332-7.
- Catucci, Marco (2009). "MAZZA, Angelo". Dizionario Biografico degli Italiani (in Italian). Vol. 72: Massimo–Mechetti. Rome: Istituto dell'Enciclopedia Italiana. ISBN 978-88-12-00032-6.
