= Paul Duqueylar =

French historical painter

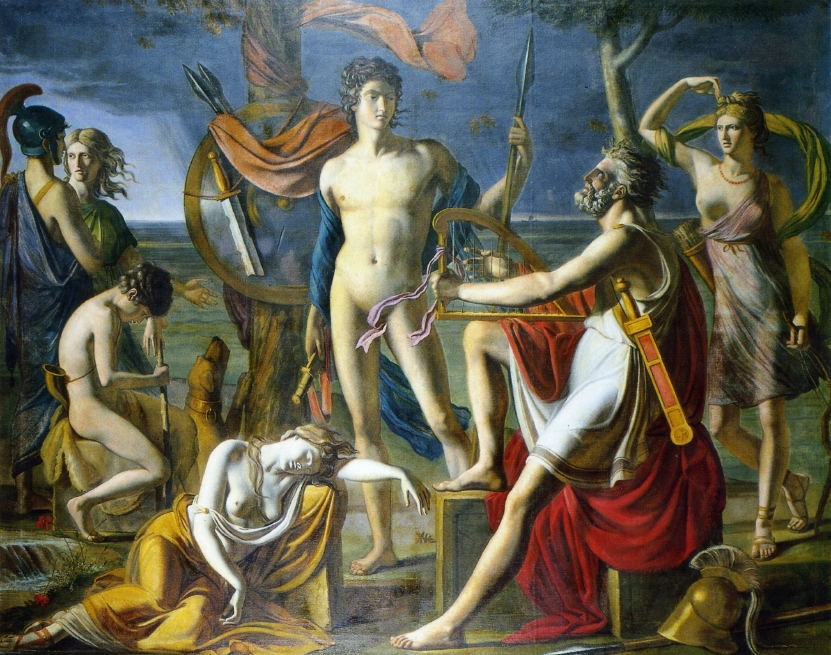
Paul Duqueylar, Ossian Reciting His Songs 1800 Musée Granet.

Paul Duqueylar (1771 – 1829 or 1845) was a French historical painter. He was born at Digne on 31 October 1771. He was a student of David and became close to the group of the "Barbus," students of David who opposed his style. Duqueylar spent several year in Rome and then settled in Lambesc.

Most of the subjects painted by him are taken from the classic poets and ancient historians, and are of an elevated character. The Judgment of Minos, and Belisarius, both painted at Rome in 1804, are described by Kotzebue in his Souvenirs d'ltalie. He died on 9 April 1829 or on 1 March 1845.

== Selected works ==
- Ossian Reciting His Songs, 1800, oil on canvas, exhibited at the Salon of 1800 and/or the Salon of 1810, Musée Granet
- (attributed), Orpheus, ca. 1800, oil on canvas, Sotheby's, London, 4 July 2013, lot. no. 238
- Holy Family, painting, exhibited at the Salon of 1810, cat. no. 283, whereabouts unknown
