= Melchiorre Cesarotti =

Italian poet, translator and theorist

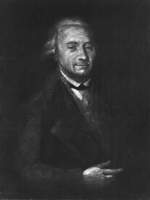
Melchiorre Cesarotti

Melchiorre Cesarotti (Italian pronunciation: [melˈkjɔrre tʃezaˈrɔtti]; May 15, 1730 – November 4, 1808) was an Italian poet, translator and theorist.

== Biography ==
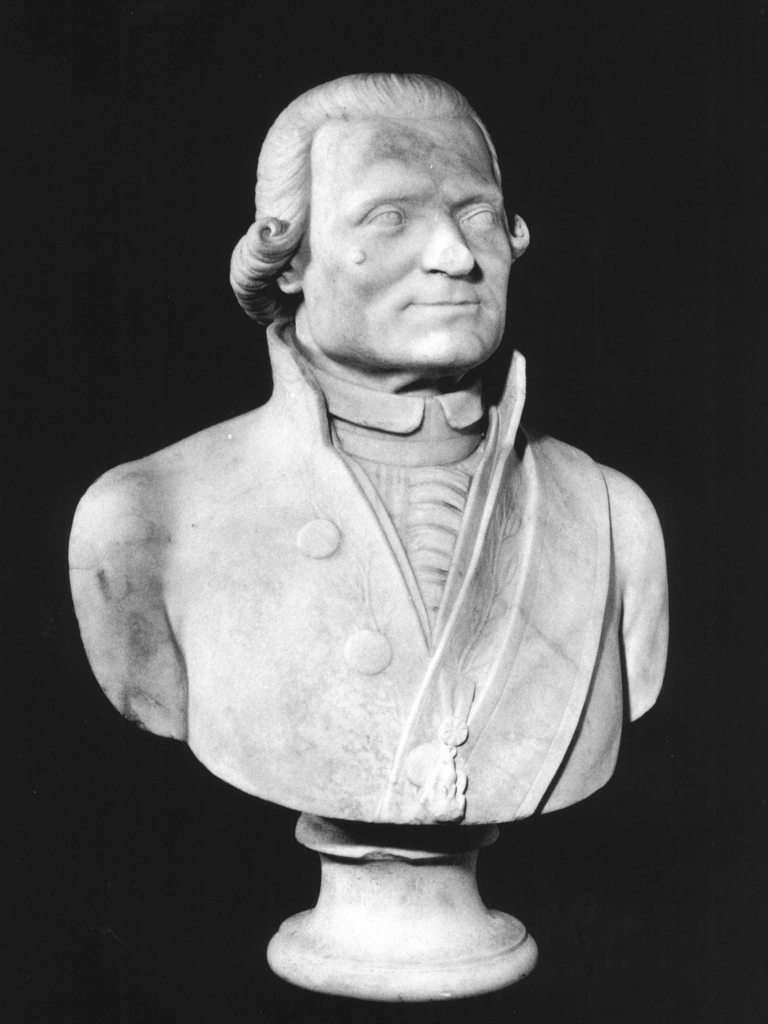
Bust of Melchiore Cesarotti

He was born in Padua, to a noble but impoverished family. He studied in the Seminary of Padua, where he obtained, immediately after the end of his studies, the chair of Rhetoric. At the University of Padua his literary progress gained him the professorship of Greek and Hebrew in 1768, and then of Rhetorics and Literature in 1797. As a supporter of the Enlightenment ideas, he wrote in favor of the French on their invasion of Italy in 1797; he received a pension, and was made knight of the iron crown by Napoleon I, to whom he addressed a bombastic and flattering poem called Pronea (1807).

Cesarotti is best known as a translator and a theorist. His translation of Ossian (Padua 1763 and 1772) attracted much attention in Italy and France, and raised many imitators of the Ossianic style. Napoleon particularly admired the work. As a professor of Greek at the University of Padua, Cesarotti also published a full translation of Demosthenes, and two different versions of Homer's Iliad: one faithful and literal, the other (called The Death of Hector) was supposed to improve the text in order to adapt it to modern taste.

As a theorist and a critic, Cesarotti produced several prose works, including a Course of Greek Literature, and essays On the Origin and Progress of the Poetic Art (1762), On the Sources of the Pleasure derived from Tragedy (1762), On the Philosophy of Taste (1784). His Essay on the Philosophy of Language (1785) is one of the most remarkable works in the field of linguistics written in Italy during the age of Enlightenment.

A complete edition of his works, in 42 vols. 8vo, began to appear at Pisa in 1800, and was completed in 1813, after his death.
