= A Cry from Heaven =

2005 play by Vincent Woods

- Written by: Vincent Woods
- Original language: English

Premiere
- Date premiered: June 9, 2005
- Place premiered: Abbey Theatre, Dublin, Ireland

A Cry from Heaven is a 2005 play by Irish playwright Vincent Woods. It retells the story of the beautiful Deirdre and the Sons of Usna which is one of the great tragedies of Irish myth. The birth of a girl heralded by omens of a vulture-shrouded sky begins the drama of King Conchobar mac Nessa and his obsession with Deirdre which led to a land divided. When Deirdre unites with her lover Naoise and goes into exile with the Sons of Usna, the stage is set for betrayal and bloodthirsty revenge that will plunge all Ulster into darkness. The play is drawn from material in the Ulster Cycle. Woods's poetic retelling of the myth of Deirdre transforms this timeless story into a compelling contemporary drama.

The play had its world premiere at the Abbey Theatre, Dublin, in June 2005. It was directed by Olivier Py, and designed by Pierre-André Weitz. The cast featured Kelly Campbell as Deirdre, Alan Turkington as Naoise, Olwen Fouéré as Ness, Denis Conway as Fergus, Bosco Hogan as Felim, Gabrielle Reidy as Leabharcham, Barry McGovern as Cathbad the druid, Ciarán Taylor as Conor, Peter Gaynor as Ainle, Aidan Turner as Ardán, Tony McKenna as White Bull, Charlie Kranz as Black Bull, and Shane Gately as Red Branch Soldier.

== Reviews ==
- A Review by Harvey O'Brien
