= Luccreth moccu Chiara =

Luccreth moccu Chíara (floruit c. 665 AD) was a poet from County Kerry, Ireland who wrote in archaic Old Irish. Moccu is an archaic form marking affiliation to an ancestral population group or gens, in this case the Cíarraige. James Carney identifies the poet in genealogies of the Cíarraige as the last of six sons of a certain Áine, a descendant of Mug Airt, also known as Cíar, son of the legendary Ulaid hero Fergus mac Róich and supposed founder of the Cíarraige. The genealogies add that Luccreth had no children, and that "His dwelling-place faces the church of Cluain on the south".

== Works ==
Three poems attributed to Luccreth are preserved, all on genealogical themes. Eoin MacNeill describes him as "an experimenter in the production of new metres", blending older syllabic and alliterative verse forms with newer, accentual and rhyming verse forms.

=== Conailla Medb míchuru ===
The 73-line poem Conailla Medb Míchuru ("Medb enjoined evil contracts") is preserved, along with a later prose introduction, in a genealogical tract in the 15th-century manuscript Laud Misc 610 in the Bodleian Library, and has been edited and translated by P. L. Henry. It contains one of the earliest references in Irish literature to events and characters of the Ulster Cycle, telling of the Ulaid hero Fergus mac Róich's exile from his king, Conchobar, to queen Medb and king Ailill, and his involvement in their war over the Ulaid's cattle. However, his exile is not in Connacht, as in the extant versions of Táin Bó Cúailnge and related stories, but in Tara. Cú Chulainn does not appear, his role taken by Fergus' son Fiacc, who defends the Ulaid against his father's battalions. The poem goes on to tell how the descendants of the Ulaid hero Cethern settled in the midlands, and later migrated to Munster in the time of Óengus mac Nad Froích (d. 490). Luccreth refers to the material he presents as sen-eolas ("old knowledge"), traditional material passed down from his ancestors.

=== Ba mol Mídend midlaige ===
Another poem ascribed to Luccreth is Ba mol Mídend midlaige ("It was the prophetic utterance of Midend, the fool"), also found in the Laud genealogical tract. It tells how the ancestors of the Corcu Óchae, a people of Munster who traced their ancestry to an Ulster Cycle character, Dubthach Dóeltenga, migrated from Ulster to Munster following the eruption of Lough Neagh.

=== Cú-cen-máthair ===
The third work attributed to Luccreth is Cú-cen-máthair ("hound without a mother"), a poem on the genealogy of the Eóganachta king Cathal Cú-cen-máthair (d. 665). It includes an early account of the 72 peoples said to have been dispersed from the plain of Shinar, each with their own language, following the Tower of Babel. However, their names, arranged in Irish metre, have been shown to derive not from Genesis, but rather from the roster of nations, former Roman provinces and other places mentioned in St. Isidore's Etymologiae (Books IX and XIV):

"Bithin, Scithin, Scuitt, Scill,
Scarthaig, Greic, Guitt, Gaill.
Germain, Point, Pampil muaid,
Moraind luind, Lugdoin uaig.
Oatri, Cipri, Ciclaid, Creit,
Corsic, Sardain, Sicil, Reit.
Rigind, Rudi, Romain mair,
Masail, Mussin, Macedoin nair.
Numin, Noric, Nombithi braiss,
Bretain, Belgaich, Boet maiss.
Magoich, Armein, amais gairg,
Galait, Achaid, Athain aird.
Alain, Albain, Hircain oig,
Etail, Espain, Guith goich.
Grinne fairne Frainc, Frig,
Fresin, Longbaird luind lir.
Lacdemoin, Tessail, Traic,
Troian, Dardain, Dalmait, Daic.

This listing, in several variants, seems to have become well known in medieval Ireland, as forms of it appear in both Auraicept na n-Éces and the later Lebor Gabála Érenn.
