= Caladbolg =

Legendary sword of Fergus mac Róich

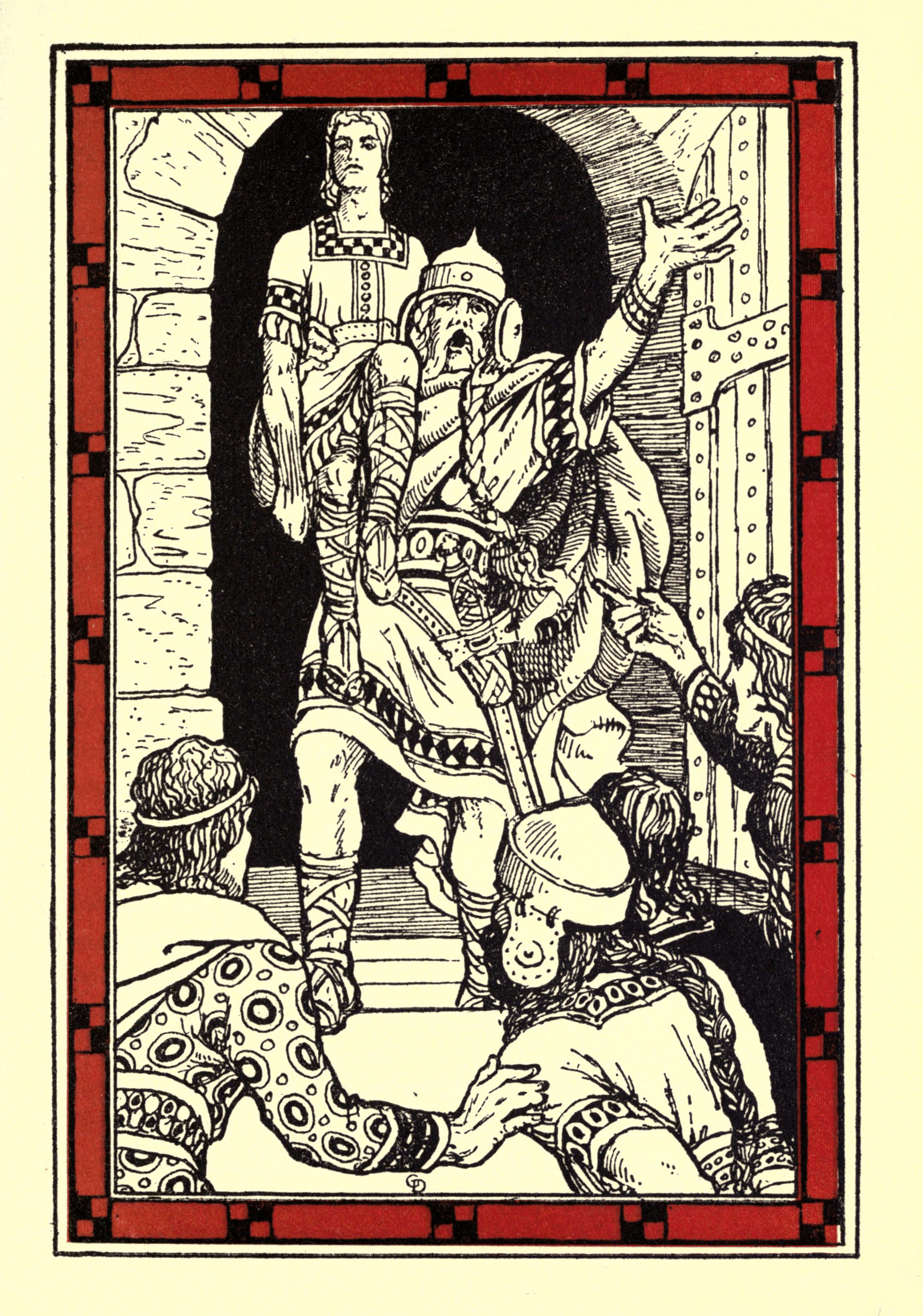
Illustration of Fergus mac Róich carrying Sétanta, with sword at his side. (George Denham, 1909)

Caladbolg ("hard cleft", also spelled Caladcholg, "hard blade") is the sword of Fergus mac Róich from the Ulster Cycle of Irish mythology.

Fergus calls his sword by that name in Táin Bó Cúailnge. Ailill mac Máta had stolen Fergus's sword when he caught him in flagrante with Medb. Fergus carved a dummy wooden sword to disguise the fact he was unarmed. Ailill returns the sword to him before the final battle, and Fergus speaks a poem over it, calling it Caladcholc in one version, and Caladbolg in another. It is said to have been "the sword of Leite from the elf-mounds. When one wished to strike with it, it was as big as a rainbow in the air." Prevented from using it against Conchobar mac Nessa, Fergus instead cuts off the tops of three hills.

A poem in the Duanaire Finn traces ownership of the sword through various figures of classical mythology and history, passing down from Saturn, via the heroes of the Trojan War, to Julius Caesar, to Cú Chulainn, who gave it to Fergus. After Fergus's death, it was passed down through the generations from Medb, to Fionn mac Cumhaill's grandson Oscar, and ultimately to Saint Patrick.

T. F. O'Rahilly argues that Caladbolg is the older form of the name, and interprets it as meaning "hard lightning". He connects it with the Builg, an ancient people of Ireland (he identifies a subgroup of the Múscraige called the Dál Caladbuilg), as well as Middle Welsh: Caledfwlch, the Welsh name of King Arthur's sword Excalibur. Other sources connect similarly named swords with the legends of Arthur, Cú Chulainn, Fergus mac Léti, and Fergus mac Róich.

The name Caladbolg appears in the plural as a generic word for "great swords" in the 10th-century Irish translation of the classical tale The Destruction of Troy, Togail Troí.

== See also ==
- Claíomh Solais
- Gáe Bulg
