= Deirdre =

Heroine in Irish mythology

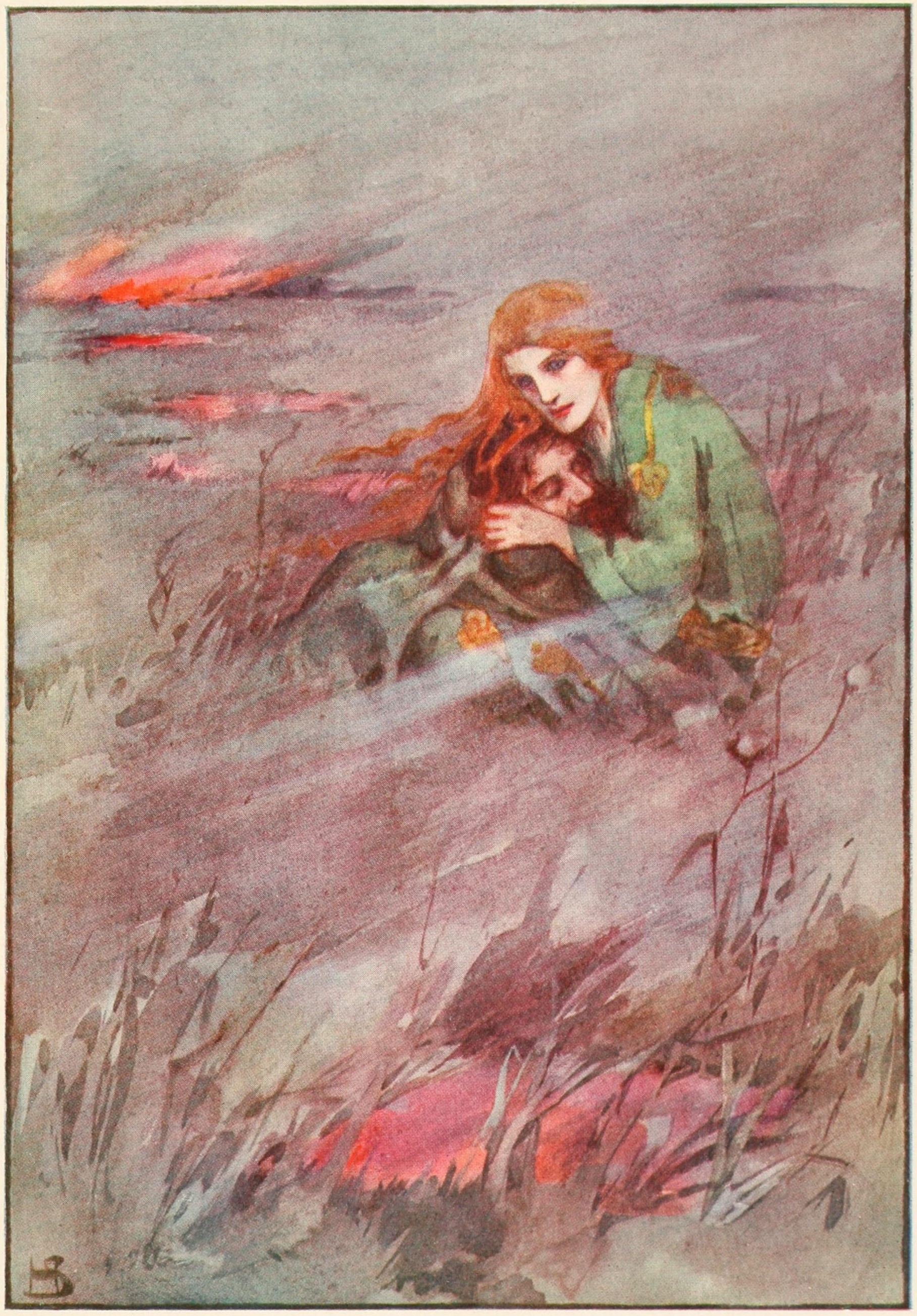
A painting of Deirdre in A book of myths (1915), by Helen Stratton

Deirdre (/ˈdɪərdrə, -dri/ DEER-drə, -dree, Irish: [ˈdʲɛɾˠdʲɾʲə]; Old Irish: Derdriu [ˈd̠ʲerʲd̠ʲɾʲu]) is a tragic heroine in the Ulster Cycle of Irish mythology. She is also known by the epithet "Deirdre of the Sorrows" (Irish: Deirdre an Bhróin).

Deirdre is a prominent figure in Irish legend. American scholar James MacKillop assessed in 2004 that she was its best-known figure in modern times.

== In legend ==
Deirdre was the daughter of the royal storyteller Fedlimid mac Daill. Before she was born, Cathbad, the chief druid at the court of Conchobar mac Nessa, king of Ulster, prophesied that Fedlimid's daughter would grow up to be very beautiful, but that kings and lords would go to war over her, much blood would be shed because of her, and Ulster's three greatest warriors would be forced into exile for her sake.

Hearing this, many urged Fedlimid to kill the baby at birth, but Conchobar, aroused by the description of her future beauty, decided to keep the child for himself. He took Deirdre away from her family and had her brought up in seclusion by Leabharcham, a poet and wise woman, and planned to marry Deirdre when she was old enough. As a young girl, living isolated in the woodlands, Deirdre told Leabharcham one snowy day that she would love a man with the colours she had seen when a raven landed in the snow with its prey: hair the color of the raven, skin as white as snow, and cheeks as red as blood.

Leabharcham told her she was describing Naoise mac Uisneach, a handsome young warrior, hunter and singer at Conchobar's court. With the collusion of Leabharcham, Deirdre met Naoise and they fell in love. Accompanied by his brothers Ardan and Ainnle (the other two sons of Uisneach), Naoise and Deirdre fled to Scotland. They lived a happy life there, hunting and fishing and living in beautiful places; one place associated with them is Loch Etive. Some versions of the story mention that Deirdre and Naoise had children, a son, Gaiar, and a daughter, Aebgreine, who were fostered by Manannan Mac Lir.

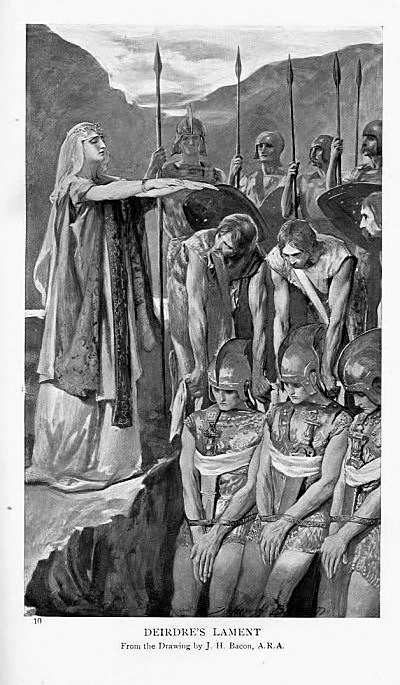
Deirdre's Lament, drawing by J. H. Bacon, c. 1905

However, the furious, humiliated Conchobar tracked them down. He sent Fergus mac Róich to them with an invitation to return and Fergus's own promise of safe conduct home. On the way back to Emain Macha, Conchobar had Fergus waylaid, forced by his personal geis (an obligation) to accept an invitation to a feast.

Fergus sent Deirdre and the sons of Uisneach on to Emain Macha with his son to protect them. When they arrived, Conchobar sent Leabharcham to spy on Deirdre, to see if she had lost her beauty. Leabharcham, to protect Deirdre, told the king that Deirdre was now ugly and aged. Conchobar then sent another spy, Gelbann, who managed to catch a glimpse of Deirdre but was seen by Naoise, who threw a gold chess piece at him and put out his eye.

The spy managed to get back to Conchobar, and told him that Deirdre was as beautiful as ever. Conchobar called his warriors to attack the Red Branch house where Deirdre and the sons of Uisneach were lodging. Naoise and his brothers fought valiantly, aided by a few Red Branch warriors, before Conchobar invoked their oath of loyalty to him and had Deirdre dragged to his side. At this point, Éogan mac Durthacht threw a spear, killing Naoise, and his brothers were killed shortly afterward.

Fergus and his men arrived after the battle. Fergus was outraged by this betrayal of his word, and went into exile in Connacht. He later fought against Ulster for Ailill and Medb in the war of the Táin Bó Cúailnge (the Cattle Raid of Cooley), sometimes referred to as "the Irish Iliad".

After the death of Naoise, Conchobar took Deirdre as his wife. After a year, angered by Deirdre's continuing coldness toward him, Conchobar asked her whom in the world she hated the most, besides himself. She answered "Éogan mac Durthacht", the man who had murdered Naoise. Conchobar said that he would give her to Éogan. As she was being taken to Éogan, Conchobar taunted her, saying she looked like a ewe between two rams. At this, Deirdre threw herself from the chariot, dashing her head to pieces against a rock.

== Cultural references ==
There are many plays and other stage productions based on Deirdre's story, including:

- Herbert Trench's Deirdre Wed (1901)
- George William Russell's Deirdre (1902)
- William Butler Yeats's Deirdre (1907)
- J. M. Synge's Deirdre of the Sorrows (1910). Synge's play enjoyed a vogue amongst composers in the earlier part of the 20th century and many of them set it to music, including Fritz Hart, Cecil Gray, Havergal Brian, Healey Wlllan and Karl Rankl.
- Vincent Woods's A Cry from Heaven (2005).
- John Coulter's Deirdre of the Sorrows (An Ancient and Noble Tale Retold by John Coulter for Music by Healey Willian) (1944), operetta
- Adriaan Roland Holst's Deirdre en de zonen van Usnach (1916)
- Fire Emblem: Genealogy of the Holy War: a character named Deirdre was featured with her story based on the mythological counterpart (1996)

Novels about her include Deirdre (1923) by James Stephens, The Celts (1988) by Elona Malterre, On Raven's Wing (1990) by Morgan Llywelyn and The Swan Maiden by Jules Watson.

Music about her includes the album A Celtic Tale: The Legend Of Deirdre (1996) by Mychael Danna & Jeff Danna. and the song Of The Sorrows from the album The Wanderlings Volume Two by Leslie Hudson.

LÉ Deirdre, a ship in the Irish Naval Service from 1972 to 2001, was named after her.

A version of Deirdre appears in the show Mystic Knights of Tir Na Nog as the main character (played by Lisa Dwan), and she is the daughter of King Conchobar and an unknown woman (believed to be a Goddess).

== See also ==
- Gráinne
- Helen of Troy
- Tristan and Iseult
- Loowit
- Rani Padmini
- Irish mythology in popular culture
- Corpus of Electronic Texts

== Texts ==
- University of Cork, Ireland : CELT (Corpus of Electronic Texts) : Longes mac nUislenn
- University of Cork, Ireland : CELT (Corpus of Electronic Texts) : Longes mac nUislenn (translation by Douglas Hyde)
- A Scoto-Irish Romance of the first century A.D., compiled from various sources by William Graham, 1908
- The Exile of the Sons of Usnech
- Deirdre of the Sorrows by J. M. Synge
- The Lament of Deirdre
- John Coulter Finding Aid McMaster University Libraries
- "Deirdrê" A detailed retelling of the story for children, by Jeanie Lang (1914)
