= Dáire mac Fiachna =

Figure in Irish mythology

Dáire mac Fiachna is an Ulster cattle-lord who appears in the Ulster Cycle of Irish mythology as the owner of Donn Cuailnge (The Brown Bull of Cooley) over which the Táin Bó Cuailnge (Cattle Raid of Cooley) is fought. Following the medieval Irish genealogies, Dáire mac Fiachna appears to have been a paternal relative of Conchobar Mac Nessa. He appears in the Táin Bó Regamon within a ghastly chariot alongside the Morrígan. He is described as a great man wrapped in a red cloak with a forked staff of hazel at his back. The Morrígan first introduces him as h-Uar-gaeth-sceo-luachair-sceo, before later revealing that he is Dáire mac Fiachna, and the owner of Donn Cuailnge.

When Queen Medb of Connacht discovers that her husband, Ailill, is considerably wealthier than her due to his possession of one extremely fertile bull, she resolves to even the account by taking possession of Dáire mac Fiachna's great bull, Donn Cuailnge. Queen Medb sends messengers to Dáire mac Fiachna with a generous offer of land, treasure, and if necessary, sexual favours, should Dáire mac Fiachna agree to loan her the bull for one year. Initially, Dáire mac Fiachna agrees. But when one of the Queen's messengers becomes inebriated, he boasts that had Dáire mac Fiachna not agreed, Queen Medb would have taken the bull by force. When Dáire mac Fiachna hears this slight, he backs out of the deal, and Queen Medb launches her army to take Donn Cuailnge, by force.

== See also ==
- Dáire
