= Furbaide Ferbend =

Character in Irish mythology

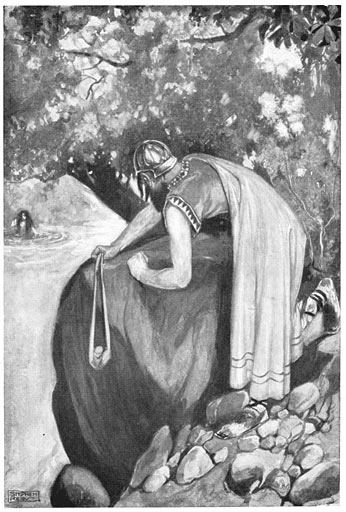
Furbaide readies his sling, from T. W. Rolleston's Myths and Legends of the Celtic Race, 1911 (illustration by Stephen Reid)

Furbaide Ferbend is a character from the Ulster Cycle of Irish mythology. Legend has it that Furbaide Ferbend was buried in a passage grave atop Carn Clonhugh, more commonly known as Corn Hill or Cairn Hill, north Longford, after the two passage graves that crown the summit.

== Life ==
His father is Conchobar mac Nessa, king of the Ulaid. His mother is one of the daughters of Eochu Feidlech, the High King of Ireland: in the saga Cath Boinde ("the battle of the Boyne) and the Dindsenchas poem "Carn Furbaide" she is Eithne, in the saga Aided Meidbe ("the death of Medb") she is Clothru. Eochu gave several of his daughters to Conchobar in marriage in compensation for Conchobar's supposed father, the former High King Fachtna Fáthach, whom Eochu had killed in the Battle of Leitir Ruad. In the sagas Furbaide's mother is murdered by her sister Medb, Conchobar's former wife and the future queen of Connacht, in the poem by her nephew Lugaid Riab nDerg, and her child is born by posthumous Caesarian section.

Cath Boinde explains the name Furbaide as deriving from Old Irish urbad, "cutting", and says his original name was Diarmaid. According to the Dindsenchas Furbaide is described as smooth-skinned and bright of hue with two horns growing on his head, hence his epithet ferbend, "horned man". The glossary Cóir Anmann ("fitness of names") says the horns – two of silver and one of gold – were on his helmet.

At the age of seventeen he fights in Conchobar's army in the Battle of Gáirech and Ilgáirech at the end of the Táin Bó Cúailnge ("cattle raid of Cooley"). In the saga Mesca Ulad ("the intoxication of the Ulaid"), where he is said to be Cúchulainn's foster-son, he fights against the Erna, but he is so beautiful none of them can bring themselves to wound him. After Conchobar's death his son Cúscraid Mend Macha succeeds him as king of the Ulaid, and gives his brother Furbaide the regions of northern and southern Tethbae.

In later life, according to Aided Meidbe, he avenges his mother's death. Medb had taken to bathing in a pool on the Shannon island of Inchcleraun. Furbaide measures the distance from the pool to the shore with a rope, and practices with his sling until he can hit an apple on top of a stake from that distance. The next time he sees Medb bathing, he shoots the nearest missile to hand – a piece of cheese – at her, and kills her. In the Dindsenchas poem he kills the mother of Lugaid Riab nDerg, and Lugaid pursues and kills him in revenge.

== See also ==
- Medb
- Cairpre Gabra
- Carn Clonhugh
