= Etarcomol =

Character found in Irish folklore

Etarconol is a character from the Ulster Cycle in Irish folklore. He is the son of Eda and Léthrenn and a foster-son of Ailill and Medb. He was the first champion to face Cú Chulainn in single combat. He was killed as Cúchulainn struck down through his crown and split him "to the navel".
