= Cormac Cond Longas =

Cormac Cond Longas (Connlongas, Connloinges, "Exiled Prince") was the eldest son of Conchobar mac Nessa by either his wife Clothru or his own mother, Ness, in the Ulster Cycle of Irish mythology. His foster father was Fergus mac Róich.

Cormac followed Fergus into exile in Connacht after the Deirdre affair, and fought for Ailill and Medb against his father in the Táin Bó Cuailnge (Cattle Raid of Cooley). During the battle, he prevented Fergus from killing Conchobar.

When Conchobar died the Ulstermen asked Cormac to return to Ulster as their king. However, on his journey home he was forced to break his geasa (taboos) and was killed when the hostel he and his men were staying in was raided.
