= Mugain =

Mugain, daughter of Eochaid Feidlech, (Irish: Mugain Etanchaitrech ingen Echach Feidlig) (sugg. pron. /Moógen Ait-en-hai-rech/ (Leahy); mod. pron. /MOO-in/), is a legendary queen in the Ulster Cycle of Irish mythology; characterized as the "Strumpet wife of Conchobar mac Nessa", the king of Ulster. Also styled Mumain, she had a son with him named Glaisne. She was also a sister of Medb by paternity.

Her epithet, Aitinchairchech, literally means "having gorse-like body hair", or perhaps more specifically pubic hair.

When Cúchulainn returned to Emain Macha after his first foray, his fury was so great the Ulstermen feared he would destroy them. Mugain led her maidens out, and they bared their breasts in front of him. Cúchulainn averted his eyes, and the Ulstermen were able to wrestle him into a barrel of cold water, which exploded from the heat of his body. They put him in a second barrel, and the water boiled; and finally a third barrel, which merely warmed up to a pleasant temperature.

Her affair with Áed, Conchobar's poet, led to the death of Lóegaire Búadach. The Ulstermen took her life, out of the love of her, though they seldom engaged in femicide.
