= Eochu Feidlech =

Legendary Irish king

Eochu or Eochaid Feidlech ("the enduring"), was a High King of Ireland, according to medieval Irish legends and historical traditions. He is best known as the father of the legendary queen Medb of Connacht.

== Family ==
Eochu was son of Finn, son of Fionnlogh, son of Rogen Ruad, son of Essamain Emna, son of Blathnachta, son of Labraid Lorc, son of Enna Aignech.

Various Middle Irish tales give him a large family. With his wife Cloithfinn, he had six daughters (Derbriu, Eile, Mugain, Eithne, Clothru and Medb) and four sons (the triplets known as the findemna, and Conall Anglondach). Derbriu was the lover of Aengus of the Tuatha Dé Danann. Her mother-in-law, Garbdalb, turned six men into pigs for the crime of eating nuts from her grove, and Derbriu protected them for a year until they were killed by Medb.

Four of Eochu's daughters married Conchobar mac Nessa after he became King of Ulster, making him Eochu's son-in-law four times. The daughters were Mugain, Eithne, Clothru and Medb. The quad-wedding was compensation for the death of Conchobar's father, Fachtna Fáthach. According to one tradition, Clothru gave birth to Conchobar's eldest son, Cormac Cond Longas. However, other traditions make him the son of Conchobar with own mother, Ness. With Eithne Conchobar had a son, Furbaide. After Medb drowned Eithne, Furbaide was born by posthumous caesarian section. Medb bore him a son called Amalgad.

After Medb later left Conchobar, Eochu made her Queen of Connacht. Some time after that, Eochu held an assembly at Tara, which both Conchobar and Medb attended. The morning after the assembly, Conchobar followed Medb down to the river Boyne where she had gone to bathe, and raped her. Eochu made war against Conchobar on the Boyne, but was defeated.

The three findemna tried to overthrow their father in the Battle of Druimm Criaich. The night before the battle, their sister Clothru, afraid that they would die without an heir, seduced all three of them, and the future High King Lugaid Riab nDerg, was conceived. The next day they were killed, and their father, seeing their severed heads, swore that no son should directly succeed his father to the High Kingship of Ireland.

== Rule and death ==
According to the 12th century Lebor Gabála Érenn, he took power when he defeated the previous High King, Fachtna Fáthach, in the Battle of Leitir Rúaid. The Middle Irish saga Cath Leitrech Ruibhe tells the story of this battle. While Fachtna Fáthach was away from Tara on a visit to Ulster, Eochu, then king of Connacht, raised an army, had the provincial kings killed and took hostages from Tara. When news reached Fachtna at Emain Macha, he raised an army of Ulstermen and gave battle at Leitir Rúaid in the Corann (modern County Sligo), but was defeated and beheaded by Eochu. Eochaid Sálbuide, the king of Ulster, was also killed. Fergus mac Róich covered the Ulster army's retreat, and Eochu marched to Tara.

He ruled for twelve years, and died of natural causes at Tara. Following his death, he was succeeded by his brother, Eochu Airem. The Lebor Gabála synchronises his reign with the dictatorship of Julius Caesar (48–44 BC). The chronology of Geoffrey Keating's Foras Feasa ar Éirinn dates his reign to 94–82 BC, that of the Annals of the Four Masters to 143–131 BC.

Preceded by Fachtna Fáthach	High King of Ireland; LGE 1st century BC; FFE 94–82 BC; AFM 143–131 BC	Succeeded by Eochaid Airem
