= Fergus mac Róich =

Character of the Ulster Cycle of Irish mythology

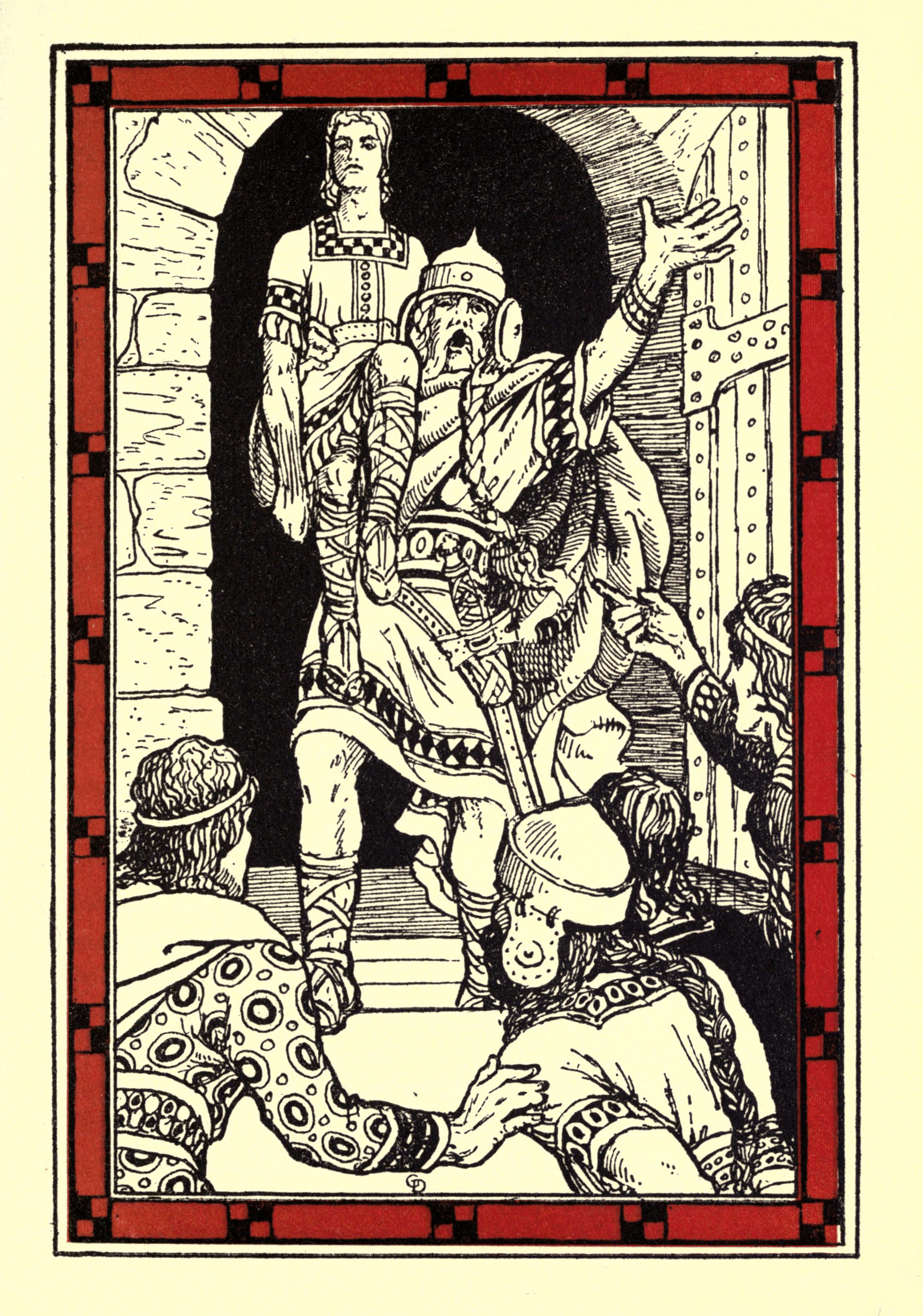
Fergus mac Róich carrying Sétanta on his shoulder, illustrated by George Denham

Fergus mac Róich/Róigh (literally "manliness, son of great stallion") is an Irish hero and a character in the Ulster Cycle of Irish mythology. Formerly the king of Ulster, he is tricked out of the kingship and betrayed by Conchobar mac Nessa, becomes the ally and lover of Conchobar's enemy, queen Medb of Connacht, and joins her expedition against Ulster in the Táin Bó Cúailnge. Fergus is described as being of huge size and sexual potency. This leads him into many a precarious situation as in the story of the Táin Bó Flidhais.

== King of Ulster ==
Fergus becomes king of Ulster after his predecessor, Eochaid Sálbuide, is killed, along with the High King Fachtna Fáthach, by Eochu Feidlech in the Battle of Leitir Ruad. While king, he desires Eochaid Sálbuide's daughter Ness, but she will only consent to marry him if he allows her son Conchobar to be king for a year, so his sons will be the sons of a king. The nobles of Ulster reassure him that the boy will be king in name only, so Fergus agrees, but Conchobar, with his mother's help, rules so wisely that the nobles make him king permanently in Fergus's place. Fergus remains Conchobar's loyal retainer, and becomes the foster-father of Conchobar's eldest son Cormac Cond Longas and nephew Cúchulainn.

== Fergus' exile ==
Conchobar's intended bride, Deirdre, elopes with the young warrior Naoise and his two brothers, and after some time of wandering they are tracked down to an island off Scotland. Conchobar announces he has forgiven them and sends Fergus, Cormac, Dubthach Dóeltenga, and Fergus' son Fíachu, to offer them safe conduct home. Naoise and his brothers swear they will eat no food until they dine with Conchobar at Emain Macha. Conchobar, however, orders the Ulstermen to invite Fergus, Cormac and Dubthach to feasts, and, as it is shameful to refuse hospitality, Fergus is separated from his charges, and Fíachu is left to escort them to Emain alone. When they arrive, Fíachu, Naoise and his brothers are murdered by Éogan mac Durthacht, a former enemy of Conchobar who has recently made peace with him. After hearing of this betrayal, Fergus, Cormac and Dubthach burn Emain Macha and defect to Connacht with three thousand followers, where they enter the service of king Ailill mac Máta and queen Medb. Conchobar forcibly marries Deirdre, who later commits suicide after he offers her to Éogan.

== Táin Bó Flidhais ==
Flidais, wife of Ailill Finn, a petty king of the Erris district of Connacht, falls in love with Fergus from afar. In Táin Bó Flidhais Fergus and Dubthach visit Ailill Finn, claiming to have fallen out with Ailill mac Máta and Medb, and provoke him to battle. However, he proves difficult to defeat, beating Dubthach in single combat and holding out against a siege of his stronghold. Fergus is only able to defeat him when Ailill arrives with the army of Connacht. After that, Fergus marries Flidais. It is said that unless he could have Flidais, it took seven women to satisfy him. He also becomes Medb's lover, and she is said to have needed thirty men to satisfy her if she couldn't have Fergus.

== Táin Bó Cúailnge ==
When Ailill and Medb raise a huge army and launch the Táin Bó Cúailnge (Cattle Raid of Cooley) to steal Ulster's stud bull, Donn Cúailnge, Fergus' knowledge of the terrain means he is chosen to lead the way. He leads the army by a roundabout route, hoping to give the Ulstermen time to raise their own army, but they are disabled by a curse. He sends a message to Cúchulainn, who begins his single-handed defence of the province.

The Connacht army separates, with Ailill leading one section, and Medb and Fergus leading the other. Ailill is suspicious, and sends his charioteer to spy on them. The charioteer finds Fergus and Medb having sex, and unnoticed, steals Fergus' sword, which Ailill keeps safe as proof. Fergus makes himself a dummy sword of wood to hide his loss. Cúchulainn holds up the army's progress by fighting a series of champions in single combat. Fergus is sent to face him, but as foster-father and foster-son, neither wants to fight the other, and in any case Fergus has no sword. Cúchulainn agrees to yield on this occasion, on the condition that Fergus yields the next time they meet.

Eventually the Ulstermen recover from their curse, and the final battle begins. Ailill gives Fergus back his sword. Fergus meets Conchobar on the battlefield, and has him at his mercy, but is prevented from killing him by Cormac. He redirects his rage into cutting off the tops of three hills with his sword. Cúchulainn, who has so far sat out the battle, recuperating from his wounds, enters the fray and challenges Fergus. Fergus honours his promise and yields, pulling his followers from the field. Medb's other allies, seeing him withdraw, panic and begin to retreat. The Connacht army is routed, and Fergus bitterly remarks, "It is the usual thing for a herd led by a mare to be strayed and destroyed."

== Decline and death ==
After the death of Conchobar, some of the Ulstermen propose inviting him home to be their king, but they ultimately decide to appoint Cormac, Conchobar's son and Fergus' foster-son, who is also in exile in Connacht. Cormac promises to remain friendly with Ailill and Medb, and sets out for Ulster. Fergus remains in Cruachan. On his journey, Cormac discovers a Connacht war-party raiding Ulster, and Cormac reluctantly attacks and defeats them. Word gets back to Medb, who sends her army after him, while keeping Fergus occupied. Eventually he hears what is happening and sets off in his chariot, but arrives too late – Cormac is already dead.

One day, after Fergus has been in exile for fourteen years, Ailill sees him swimming in a lake with Medb, and is overcome with jealousy. He tells his brother, Lugaid Dalleces, who is blind, that deer are playing in the water, and persuades him to throw a spear at them. He does so, and the spear hits Fergus in the chest. He climbs out of the water and throws the spear back, killing Ailill's deer-hound, before dying. His death-tale relates that he had killed Éogan mac Durthacht, but this story is lost.

== Other legends ==
The story is told that, in the 6th century, the poet Senchán Torpéist gathered the poets of Ireland together to see if any of them knew the story of the Táin Bó Cúailnge, but they all only knew parts of it. His son Muirgen came to Fergus' grave and spoke a poem, and Fergus' ghost appeared to him and related the events of the Táin as they happened.

Another legendary Ulster king, Fergus mac Léti, is regarded as a double of Fergus mac Róich: both die in water, and are associated with the sword Caladbolg. Another legendary Fergus, Fergus Foga of the Corcu Óchae of Munster, is identified with Fergus mac Róich by T. F. O'Rahilly.

== Issue ==
The Ciarraige, an early medieval people who gave their name to County Kerry, traced their ancestry to Ciar, a son of Fergus and Medb, as do the Conmhaicne of Leitrim, Sligo, and Galway, through Conmac. The Masraige, a tribe inhabiting Magh Slécht in County Cavan were descended from Fergus according to Corpus Genealogiarum Hiberniae, 1 16r A44, 279. According to The Stem of the Irish Nation by John O'Hart, Fergus had the following triplets with Medb;

- Conmac mac Fergus
- Ciar mac Fergus
- Corc mac Fergus

Other issue attributed to Fergus by O'Hart includes;

- Dallan mac Fergus
- Anluim mac Fergus
- Conri mac Fergus
- Aongus Fionn mac Fergus
- Oiliol mac Fergus
- Firceighid mac Fergus
- Uiter mac Fergus
- Finfailig mac Fergus
- Firtleachta mac Fergus
- Binne mac Fergus

== See also ==
- Conmhaicne
