= Cethern mac Fintain =

Cethern mac Fintain is an Ulster warrior who aids Cúchulainn in the Táin Bó Cuailnge (Cattle Raid of Cooley), according to the Ulster Cycle of Irish mythology.

As Cúchulainn lay wounded after his combat with Ferdiad, Cethern entered the fray on his chariot, stark naked and armed only with a silver spike. He killed many men, but was severely wounded.

Cúchulainn sent to the Connacht camp for doctors to tend to him. The first doctor told Cethern his wounds were fatal. Cethern punched his brains out the back of his head and asked for a second opinion. Forty-nine more doctors told him the same thing, and he killed all of them in turn, except one, who was only stunned. Finally Cúchulainn sent for Conchobar's doctor, Fingín.

Fingín examined each of Cethern's wounds and was able to tell how he received them and from whom. He gave him two options. He could save his life, but the treatment would take a whole year; or he could make him fit to fight now, in which case he would survive only three more days. Cethern chose the latter. Fingín had Cúchulainn make a bath of bone marrow, and had Cethern sleep in it. He replaced some of his ribs with chariot parts, and tied the frame of the chariot to his belly to keep his insides in. Cethern's wife arrived with his weapons, and he went back into battle.

The doctor who had only been stunned managed to reach the Connacht camp to warn them, and they put Ailill's crown on a standing stone as a decoy. Cethern put his sword and his fist through the stone. He killed men for a day and a night, until he was surrounded and died fighting.

Cethern was also said to be a mentor of Fionn Mac Cumhaill.
