= Ness (Irish mythology) =

Mythological Irish princess

Ness (Irish: Neasa, Old Irish: Ness), also called Nessa, is a princess of the Ulaid and the mother of Conchobar mac Nessa in the Ulster Cycle of Irish mythology. Her father is Eochaid Sálbuide, king of the Ulaid.

According to one version of the legend, she asks the druid Cathbad what the current day is a good day for and he replies that it is a good day to conceive a king. There are no other men around, so Ness takes Cathbad to bed and Conchobar is conceived.

In other versions, Ness was brought up by twelve foster-fathers and was originally called Assa ("easy, gentle"), because she was such a pleasure to foster. Cathbad, who is a leader of a band of fianna (landless warriors) as well as a druid in this version, attacks her foster-fathers' house, killing them all. Because the culprit cannot be identified, Eochaid is powerless to do anything about it, so Ness forms her own band of 27 fianna to track him down and becomes known as Ní-assa ("not easy, not gentle") or Ness. However, one day, when she goes off on her own to bathe, Cathbad comes upon her alone and unarmed and demands her as his wife. She has no choice but to agree, and Cathbad rapes Ness.

Eochaid gives the couple land in Crích Rois (a region covering parts of the modern counties of Louth, Monaghan and Meath), near the river Conchobar. One night Cathbad is thirsty and Ness brings him a drink of water from the river, but when he sees two worms floating in it he makes Ness drink it. Although the story specifically denies this is what makes her pregnant, there are many Irish stories in which significant characters are conceived when their mothers swallowed a tiny creature in a drink. Here, the father of her child is said to be Fachtna Fáthach, the High King of Ireland, who is Ness's lover in spite of Cathbad.

While Ness and Cathbad are travelling to visit Fachtna, Ness goes into labour on the bank of the river Conchobar. Cathbad prophesies that if she can wait until the following day before giving birth, her son will share a birthday with Jesus Christ. She sits on a flagstone by the river and the following day gives birth to a son, who is named Conchobar after the river. The baby tumbles backwards into the river and Cathbad lifts him out. Cathbad makes a prophecy in verse of his future glory, in which he refers to him as "my son and my grandson", suggesting there was once a tradition that Cathbad was Ness's father and that Conchobar was born of incest between them.

By the time Conchobar is seven, Fergus mac Róich is king of Ulster and he falls in love with Ness. She consents to marry him on one condition – that he abdicate his kingship for a year in favour of Conchobar, so that his sons will be able to call themselves the sons of a king. Fergus consults with his nobles and they advise him that the boy will be king in name only, so he agreed. But Conchobar, advised by his mother, is so crafty at distributing wealth and gifts that when the year is up, the Ulstermen won't have Fergus back and Conchobar keeps the kingship.

According to some traditions Ness is the mother of Cormac Cond Longas by incest with Conchobar (although in other traditions, Cormac's mother is Conchobar's wife Clothru). She is also the mother of Conchobar's sisters Deichtine and Findchóem.

== In popular culture ==
Cartoonist Patrick Brown adapted Ness's story as a webcomic in 2007–2008.
