= Fedlimid mac Daill =

Feidhlimidh Mac Daill (sometimes Felim mac Dall) was the father of Deirdre in the Ulster Cycle of Irish mythology. He was the bard of King Conchobar mac Nessa, whom he was entertaining when the news arrived of Deirdre's birth; the king's chief druid, Cathbad, was then asked to cast her horoscope and made his tragic prophecy about the daughter of Feidhlimidh.
