= Leabharcham =

Irish mythological figure

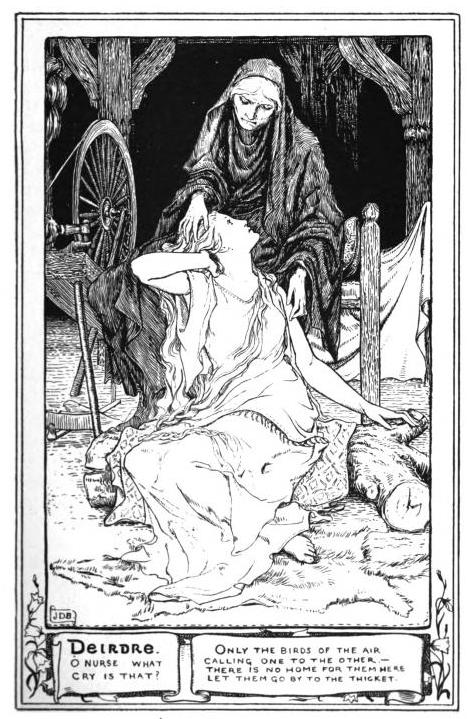
Deirdre with her nurse, Leabharcham

Leabharcham was charged by the Ulster king Conchobar mac Nessa with nursing Deirdre in seclusion until the girl was old enough to be his bride, after it was prophesied at Deirdre's birth: "The infant shall be fairest among the women of Ireland and shall wed a king but because of her shall death and ruin come upon the province of Ulster."

When the time came for Deirdre to wed the king, Leabharcham, having raised and educated the beautiful maiden, dutifully returned her surrogate daughter to Conchobar's court at Emain Macha (now Navan Fort, county Armagh). There the old poet unwittingly helped fulfill the druid Cathbad's prophecy by providing Deirdre with information about Naoise, being asked by the prospective queen to identify a handsome young warrior, "his hair like the raven's wing, his cheek the hue of blood and skin as white as snow". With Naoise, a hunter and singer at Conchobar's court, and his two brothers, Deirdre escaped to Alba (Scotland). Years later, when the young lovers were tricked into returning to Ulster, the king sent for Leabharcham to discover whether or not Deirdre was still the fairest woman in Ireland. Leabharcham, in an effort to protect Deirdre, and discourage the bitter old king from taking vengeance against Naoise, reported back to Conchobar that she had lost all of her beauty. Only after the king sent a second spy did battle break out, ending tragically with the death of Naoise and his brothers and the king's seizure of Deirdre, who leaped out of a carriage after word of her arranged marriage was given, and burst her head into fragments.

She appears as "Lavarcham" in Synge's 1910 play Deirdre of the Sorrows. Her character delivers the last line of the play: "Deirdre is dead, and Naisi is dead; and if the oaks and stars could die for sorrow, it's a dark sky and a hard and naked earth we'd have this night in Emain."
