= Bosco Hogan =

Irish stage, film, and television actor (born 1949)

- Born: 1949 (age 76–77); Ireland

John Bosco Hogan (born February 1949) is an Irish stage, film, and television actor.

He is well known as the character Dr. Michael Ryan on the television programme Ballykissangel. He appeared in a minor role as convicted felon George Saden in John Boorman's film Zardoz (1974), but his first major film role was as Stephen Dedalus in Joseph Strick's A Portrait of the Artist as a Young Man (1977), a film adaptation of James Joyce's novel of the same name. His later film credits include roles in The Outsider (1979), Screamtime (1983), In the Name of the Father (1993), Evelyn (2002) and King Arthur (2004). On television he played Jonathan Harker in the 1977 TV version of Count Dracula with Louis Jourdan; Frederick, Duke of York in Prince Regent in 1979; and Edward Ferrars in the 1981 adaptation of Sense and Sensibility. He was a senior policeman for several episodes of the television programme, The Chief (1995).

Hogan appeared in the play A Cry from Heaven by Vincent Woods at the Abbey Theatre in the summer of 2005. He portrayed St. John Fisher in the 2007 season of The Tudors television programme on the Showtime channel. He played a cardinal once again in The Borgias (2011), as Cardinal Piccolomini. Hogan also appears in Season 5 of the television series Vikings (History Channel, 2017) as Lord Abbot at Lindisfarne monastery and in its sequel series Vikings: Valhalla as Aethelred the Unready. Hogan also appeared in an episode of Tales of the Unexpected.

His distinctive voice has him regularly working on voiceovers for both advertising and corporate clients in Ireland.

Hogan attended secondary school at Terenure College, Dublin.

== Filmography ==
| Year | Title | Role | Notes |
|---|---|---|---|
| 1974 | Zardoz | George Saden | |
| 1977 | A Portrait of the Artist as a Young Man | Stephen Dedalus | |
| 1978 | Exposure | Eugene | |
| 1979 | The Outsider | Finbar Donovan | |
| 1983 | Screamtime | Doctor | |
| 1984 | Anne Devlin | Robert Emmett | |
| 1988 | Taffin | The Builder | |
| 1993 | In the Name of the Father | Defense Counsel | |
| 1996 | Some Mother's Son | British Captain | |
| 1997 | How to Cheat in the Leaving Certificate | News Reader | |
| 2002 | Evelyn | Father O'Malley | |
| 2004 | King Arthur | Bishop Decoy | |
| 2005 | Tara Road | Accountant | |
| 2014 | The Inquiry | William Martin Murphy | |
| 2016 | The Flag | Flint | |
| 2018 | Citizen Lane | Reverend James Lane | |
| 2018 | We Have Always Lived in the Castle | Old Ned | |
| 2019 | The Professor and the Madman | Lord Chief Justice | |
| 2020 | The Legion | Saul | |
| 2021 | The Last Duel | Priest at Duel | |
