= Creeveroe =

Coordinates: 54.350°N 6.708°W

Creeveroe: Irish: an Chraobh Rua
- Location within Northern Ireland
- District: Armagh, Banbridge and Craigavon
- County: County Armagh
- Country: Northern Ireland
- Sovereign state: United Kingdom
- Post town: ARMAGH
- Postcode district: BT
- Dialling code: 028
- Police: Northern Ireland
- Fire: Northern Ireland
- Ambulance: Northern Ireland
- UK Parliament: Newry and Armagh
- NI Assembly: Newry and Armagh

Creeveroe (from Irish an Chraobh Rua, "the red branch") is a townland in County Armagh, Northern Ireland. It is about three-and-a-half miles west of Armagh, and is situated within the civil parish of Eglish. The townland derives its name from the Irish an Chraobh Rua, referring to the Red Branch, one of the three halls of Conchobar mac Nessa, legendary king of the Ulaid, at nearby Navan Fort.

Creeveroe neighbours the townland of Ballyrea, the location of Ballyrea Orange Hall, and the base of Ballyrea Boyne Defenders flute band. The Australian poet Victor James William Patrick Daley was born at Creeveroe and used it as his pen name.

There are also townlands named Creeveroe in County Clare and County Galway in the Republic of Ireland.
