= Olivier Py =

French stage director, actor and writer (born 1965)

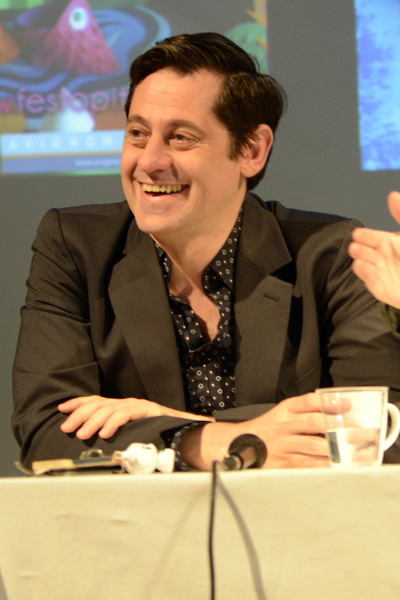

Olivier Py (French pronunciation: [pi]; born 24 July 1965 in Grasse, Alpes-Maritimes) is a French stage director, actor and writer.

== Career ==
In 1997, Py became director of the Centre dramatique national d'Orléans. In 2007, he became director of the Théâtre de l'Odéon in Paris.

Py describes himself as Catholic and homosexual. He is known for his emphasis on Catholic and homoerotic themes.

Since the early 2000s, Py has increasingly devoted himself to the opera. His productions of La damnation de Faust, Tannhäuser and Tristan und Isolde, all in Geneva, have generally been well received. In March 2008, he debuted at the Paris Opéra. On this occasion he stated to a French magazine (Diapason, March 2008) that he "would not be done staging operas until [he] did Wagner's Ring and Parsifal".

From 2013 to 2022 he was in charge of the Avignon Festival.

== Theatre ==
=== Works written and directed ===
- 1988: Des oranges et des ongles
- 1990: Gaspacho, un chien mort
- 1991: La femme canon et le bouquet final
- 1992: Les Aventures de Paco Goliard
- 1992: La Nuit au cirque
- 1992: La chèvre
- 1994: La Jeune fille, le diable et le moulin
- 1995: La Servante – histoire sans fin
- 1996: Apologétique
- 1997: Le Visage d'Orphée
- 1998: Requiem pour Srebrenica
- 1999: L'Eau de la vie
- 2000: Le Cabaret de Miss Knife
- 2000: L'apocalypse joyeuse
- 2001: Au monde comme n'y étant pas
- 2001: L'Exaltation du labyrinthe
- 2001: Épître aux jeunes acteurs pour que soit rendue la parole à la parole
- 2003: Jeunesse
- 2004: Le Vase de parfums, opera libretto
- 2004: Faust Nocturne
- 2004: Miss Knife chante Olivier Py
- 2005: Les Vainqueurs
- 2006: Illusions Comiques
- 2011: Romeo et Juliette (Shakespeare), at Theatre de l'Odeon
- 2011: Die Sonne (Le Soleil), Volksbühne Berlin, Berlin, Germany

=== Published works ===
- 1994: La Jeune fille, le diable et le moulin, L'école des loisirs
- 1998: Théâtre, Solitaires Intempestifs
- 2005: Les Vainqueurs, Actes Sud
- 2007: Les Enfants de Saturne

=== Other productions ===
- 1989: Mon Père qui fonctionnait par périodes culinaires et autres (Élizabeth Mazev)
- 1996: Miss Knife et sa baraque chantante, Festival d'Avignon
- 1993: Les Drôles (Élizabeth Mazev)
- 1999: Der Freischütz (Carl Maria von Weber), Opéra de Nancy
- 2001: Les Contes d'Hoffmann (Jacques Offenbach), Grand Théâtre de Genève
- 2003: La damnation de Faust (Hector Berlioz), Geneva
- 2003: Le Soulier de satin (Paul Claudel), Orléans
- 2005: Tristan und Isolde (Richard Wagner, Geneva
- 2005: Tannhäuser (Richard Wagner), Geneva
- 2006: A Cry from Heaven (Vincent Woods)
- 2006: Curlew River (Benjamin Britten)
- 2008: The Rake's Progress (Igor Stravinsky), Opéra National de Paris (Palais Garnier)
- 2008: La Trilogie du Diable: La Damnation de Faust (Hector Berlioz), Der Freischütz (Carl Maria von Weber), Les Contes d'Hoffmann (Jacques Offenbach). Grand Théâtre de Genève
- 2017: Mam'zelle Nitouche – in which he appeared as an actor/singer, touring until 2019
- 2018: Lohengrin (Richard Wagner), La Monnaie, Brussels; 2022 Opera Australia

== Movies ==
=== Actor ===
- 1989: Dis-moi oui, dis-moi non (short) directed by Noémie Lvovsky
- 1995: Funny Bones directed by Peter Chelsom
- 1995: Au petit Marguery directed by Laurent Bénégui
- 1995: 75 centilitres de prière (short) directed by Jacques Maillot
- 1995: Corps inflammables (short) directed by Jacques Maillot
- 1996: Casse-casse partie (TV) directed by Gérard Renouf
- 1996: Chacun cherche son chat directed by Cédric Klapisch
- 1997: La Divine poursuite directed by Michel Deville
- 1998: Late August, Early September
- 1999: Peut-être directed by Cédric Klapisch
- 1999: Nos vies heureuses directed by Jacques Maillot
- 2000: Les Yeux fermés (TV) directed by Olivier Py
