= Dubthach Dóeltenga =

In the Ulster Cycle of Irish mythology, Dubthach Dóeltenga ("chafer-tongue", an Old Irish term which meant "backbiting") was a cynical ally of Fergus mac Róich who rarely had a good word to say about anyone. He accompanied Fergus to escort Deirdre and Naoise back to Ireland under the orders of Conchobar and later followed Fergus into exile in Connacht following Naoise's murder under Conchobar's orders. He was responsible for the death of Conchobar's son, among others. He later fought beside him in the Táin Bó Cuailnge, although at one point Fergus kicked him right out of the camp for his plans to kill Cú Chulainn. He also appears in Fled Bricrenn and Togail Bruidne Dá Derga.
