= Eochaid Sálbuide =

Eochaid Sálbuide (also known as Echu Sálbuide, Eochaid Yellow-heel) is a king of Ulster prior to the events of the Ulster Cycle of Irish mythology. His daughter was Ness, the mother of legendary king of Ulster Conchobar mac Nessa. Eochaid Sálbuide died at the Battle of Leitir Ruadh, fighting on the side of the High King of Ireland, Fachtna Fáthach, against Eochaid Feidlech, who defeated and deposed him as High King.

He was succeeded as king of Ulster by Fergus mac Róich.
