= Red Branch =

Legendary royal hall

In the Ulster Cycle, the Red Branch (Old Irish: Cráebruad; modern Irish: Craobh Rua(dh)) was the primary residence of Conchobar mac Nessa, King of Ulster, situated in his capital of Emain Macha. It was one of three royal halls in Emain Macha, the others being Cráebderg ("ruddy branch"), containing Conchobar's treasury and the heads of his foes, and Téte Brec ("twinkling hoard"), containing weapons and armour. The name apparently derived from a large painted beam running across the ceiling. It may be echoed in Creeveroe, the name of a modern-day townland near the site of Emain Macha.

Conchobar's followers were sometimes known as the Curaidh na Craobhruaidhe or "Red Branch Knights" in reference to the hall.

== Modern usage ==
- The name "Red Branch Knights" was used by a loyalist paramilitary group that in September 1992 claimed responsibility for incendiary devices and a blast bomb left in a Dublin-based bank in Newtownabbey, Northern Ireland. Statements were sent to the media threatening action against anyone with political or economic links with the Republic of Ireland. The group is not known to have been responsible for any casualties during the Troubles.
- A Belfast-based folk group goes by the name "Craobh Rua".
- The name "Knights of the Red Branch" was used by an Irish Catholic fraternal organization in Philadelphia and San Francisco in the 19th and 20th centuries. The society was originally a patriotic and military organization in Ireland, but functioned as a fraternal and beneficial society in America in the early 20th century.

== Notes ==
- MacKillop, James (1998). A Dictionary of Celtic Mythology. Oxford University Press. ISBN 0-19-869157-2.
