= Éogan mac Durthacht =

Éogan mac Durthacht is king of Fernmag (Farney, County Monaghan) in the Ulster Cycle of Irish mythology. At the feast given by Mac Da Thó, Cet mac Magach relates how he blinded Eogan's eye by casting back the spear that struck his shield.

Eogan was an enemy of Ulster and its king, Conchobar mac Nessa, but later made his peace with them. He murdered Deirdre's husband, Naoise, on Conchobar's orders. Later the bereaved Deirdre is asked by Conchobar whom she detests the most, and she replies Conchobar himself and Eogan mac Durthacht, whereby Conchobar decided she should go live with Eogan for a year. But the heroine chooses death over this fate.
