= Findchóem =

Irish mythological character

Findchóem (also spelled Finnchóem, Findcháem, Finncháem, Fionnchaomh) is a character from the Ulster Cycle of Irish mythology.

She is known variously as; the sister of the Ulster king Conchobar mac Nessa, the wife of the poet Amergin, the mother of Conall Cernach and the foster mother of Cúchulainn.
