= Cathbad =

Mythical Irish druid

Artistic rendition of Cathbad (Seóirse Ua Fágáin, 1904)

Cathbad (Old Irish pronunciation: [ˈkaθβað]) or Cathbhadh (modern spelling) is the chief druid in the court of King Conchobar mac Nessa in the Ulster Cycle of Irish Mythology.

He features in both accounts of Conchobar's birth, in one of which he is the king's father. In the first, Nessa, daughter of Eochaid Sálbuide, the then king of Ulster, asks the druid what it is an auspicious time for (as he had the ability to foretell the future). Cathbad replies, "for begetting a king on a queen". There were no other men around, so Ness takes Cathbad to bed and conceives a son.

In the second version, Cathbad, who is a leader of a band of fianna (landless warriors) as well as a druid, attacks Ness's foster-fathers' house, killing all 12 of them. Because the culprit cannot be identified, Eochaid is powerless to do anything about it, so Ness forms her own band of 27 fianna to track him down. However, one day, when she goes off on her own to bathe, Cathbad comes upon her alone and unarmed, and demands her as his wife. She has no choice but to agree, and Cathbad rapes her. However, in this version, Ness's child is the son of her lover, High King Fachtna Fáthach, not Cathbad's. Ness goes into labour, and Cathbad tells her if she can manage not to give birth until the following day, her son will be a great king and have everlasting fame. Ness sits on a flagstone by the river Conchobar and the following morning gives birth. The baby falls into the river, but Cathbad lifts him out, names him Conchobar after the river, and brings him up as his own son.

The druid was also present at the birth of Deirdre and prophesied her tragic fate, but Conchobar ignored him. On another occasion, the young Cú Chulainn overheard Cathbad prophesies that anyone who took arms on that day would have everlasting fame but a short life; he immediately ran to Conchobar and asked to be armed.
