= John Coulter (playwright) =

Irish-Canadian writer and playwright (1888–1980)

- Born: 12 February 1888; Belfast, Northern Ireland
- Died: 1 December 1980 (aged 92); Toronto, Canada
- Education: University of Manchester
- Occupations: Playwright, broadcaster
- Spouse: Olive Clare Primrose

John Coulter (12 February 1888, Belfast – 1 December 1980, Toronto) was an Irish Canadian playwright and broadcaster.

== Life ==
He graduated from the University of Manchester. He taught school in Belfast and Dublin until 1919. He moved to London in 1920, where he wrote for BBC radio. In 1924 he became editor of The Ulster Review, and in 1927, managing editor of The New Adelphi.

He moved to Toronto in 1936, where he wrote for CBC radio, and he married Olive Clare Primrose, a poet and short story writer. They had two daughters, including actress Clare Coulter.

His papers are held at McMaster University.

== Works ==
=== Autobiography ===
- In My Day: Memoirs, Willowdale, ON: Hounslow Press, 1980

=== Novels ===
- Turf Smoke, Ryerson Press, 1945

=== Biography ===
- Churchill, Ryerson Press, 1944

=== Plays ===
- Conochar, Broadcast BBC, 1934
- The Folks In Brickfield Street, Abbey Theatre, Dublin 1937
- The House In The Quiet Glen, Margaret Eaton Hall, Toronto, 1937 (Awarded Best Canadian Play at the Dominion Drama Festival, 1938.)
- Holy Manhattan, Arts and Letters Club, Toronto, 1940
- Pigs, Hart House Theatre, 1940
- Christmas Comes But Once A Year, Arts and Letters Club, Toronto 1942
- Transit Through Fire, University of Toronto at Convocation Hall, 1942
- Mr Oblomoff, 1946
- The Drums Are Out, Abbey Theatre, Dublin 1948
- Riel, New Play Society, Toronto, 1950
- Sleep My Pretty One, rehearsed reading St James Theatre, London, 1951
- Dierdre, Macmillan Theatre, Toronto, 1965
- The Crime Of Louis Riel, Dominion Drama Festival, London, Ontario 1966
- The Trial Of Louis Riel, Saskatchewan House, Regina, 1967
  - Riel: a play: in two parts, Cromlech Press, 1972
- A Capful Of Pennies, Central Library Theatre, Toronto 1967
- The drums are out: a play in three acts, De Paul University, 1971
- While I Live, 1971
- Francois Bigot: A Rediscovery in Dramatic Form of the Fall of Quebec, Hounslow Press, Toronto, 1978
- Living Together, Theatre Passe Muraille, Toronto 1980
- Mr Kean Of Drury Lane, 1980

=== Opera librettos ===
- Transit Through Venus, 1942
- Deirdre of the Sorrows, 1946
