= Fachtna Fáthach =

High King of Ireland

Fachtna Fáthach ("the wise"), son of Cas (or Ross), son of Rudraige, was, according to medieval Irish legend and historical tradition, a High King of Ireland. He came to power when he defeated the previous High King, Dui Dallta Dedad, in the battle of Árd Brestine. According to some stories, he was the lover of Ness, daughter of Eochaid Sálbuide, king of Ulster, and the father of her son, Conchobar mac Nessa, the king of Ulster in the stories of the Ulster Cycle.

After he had reigned for sixteen or twenty-five years, he paid a visit to Ulster. While he was there, Eochu Feidlech, king of Connacht, raised an army and marched on Tara. With the support of the Ulstermen, Fachtna challenged him to battle. Eochu agreed, and named the battlefield as Leitir Ruad in the Corann, Connacht. During the battle, Eochu surrounded and beheaded Fachtna, and became High King in his place.

== Time frame ==
The Lebor Gabála Érenn synchronises Fachtna's reign with the Roman civil war between Caesar and Pompey (49 BC) and the reign of Cleopatra (51–30 BC). The chronology of Geoffrey Keating's Foras Feasa ar Éirinn dates his reign to 110–94 BC, that of the Annals of the Four Masters to 159–143 BC;

== Issue ==
- Conchobar mac Nessa
- Findchóem (wife of Amergin mac Eccit)

Preceded by Dui Dallta Dedad	High King of Ireland; LGE 1st century BC; FFE 110–94 BC; AFM 159–143 BC	Succeeded by Eochu Feidlech
