= Donn Cuailnge =

Magical bull from Irish mythology

Donn Cúailnge
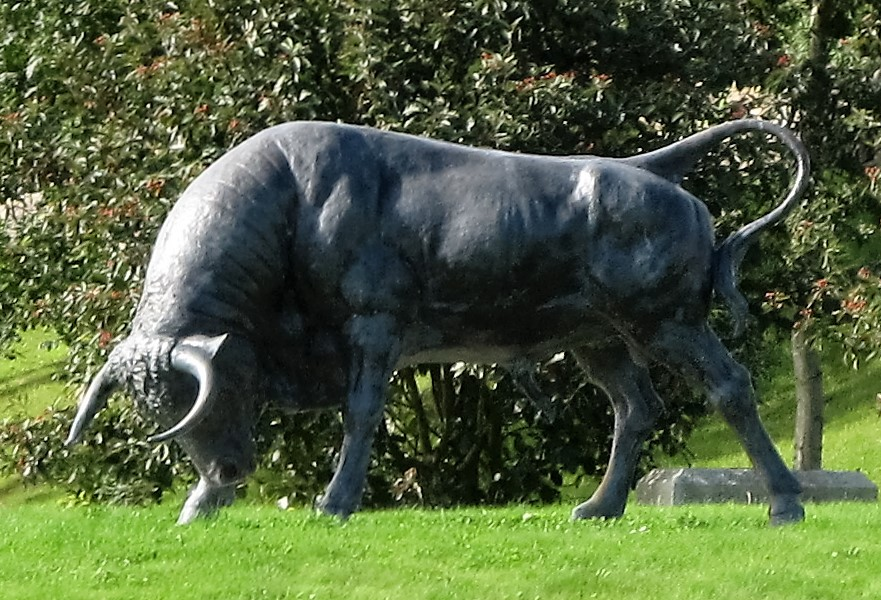
- Statue of Donn Cuailnge on the Cooley Peninsula

Creature information
- Other name(s): The Brown Bull of Cooley
- Grouping: Irish mythology
- Sub grouping: Mythical bull

Origin
- Country: Ireland

In the Ulster Cycle of Irish mythology Donn Cúailnge, the Brown Bull of Cooley, was an extremely fertile stud bull over whom the Táin Bó Cúailnge (Cattle Raid of Cooley) was fought.

== Prologue ==
A ninth century rémscéla or foretale recounts how the tale came to be. In the 6th century, the poet Senchán Torpéist gathered the poets of Ireland together to see if any of them knew the story of the Táin Bó Cúailnge, but they all only knew parts of it. His son Muirgen came to the grave of Fergus mac Róich and spoke a poem, and Fergus' ghost appeared to him and related the events of the Táin as they happened.

== Legend ==
He was originally a man named Friuch, a pig-keeper, who worked for Bodb Dearg, king of the Munster sidh. He fell out with Rucht, who was a pig-keeper for Ochall Ochne, king of the Connaught sidh. The two fought, transforming into various animal and human forms, ultimately becoming two worms which were swallowed by two cows and reborn as two bulls, Donn Cuailnge and Finnbhennach ("White-horned"). Donn belonged to Dáire mac Fiachna, a cattle-lord of Ulster; Finnbhennach was born into the herds of queen Medb of Connacht, but considered belonging to a woman beneath him and joined the herds of her husband, Ailill.

The Mórrígan had a heifer which she took to Cooley to be bulled by Donn. The result was a bull-calf which fought Finnbhennach and narrowly lost. After seeing that, Medb was determined to see Finnbhennach fight the bull-calf's sire.

When Medb discovered that owning Finnbhennach made Ailill richer than her, she resolved to even the account by possessing Donn Cuailnge. She sent messengers to Dáire with an extremely generous offer of land and treasure, and if necessary sexual favours, if he would loan the bull to her for a year. Dáire agreed. However the messengers got drunk, and one boasted that if he hadn't agreed Medb would have taken the bull by force. When Dáire heard that he backed out of the deal.

Medb raised an army to steal Donn, and marched on Ulster. As Fergus mac Róich knew the terrain he was chosen to lead. The Mórrígan, in the form of a crow, warned Donn of the coming army, and Donn Cuailnge goes on a rampage.

The men of Ulster were intent on fighting Medb's army but were disabled by the curse of Cruinniuc's wife, Macha. The only person fit to defend Ulster was seventeen-year-old Cúchulainn, but he let the army take Ulster by surprise while off on a tryst instead of watching the border. Medb ultimately tracked Donn Cuailnge down, and the bull gored the first Connaught herdsman who attempted to capture him. He then stampeded with fifty heifers through the camp, killing fifty warriors before charging off into the countryside.

Cúchulainn met Medb's army on the mount of Slieve Foy and invoked the right of single combat at a ford, defeating a series of champions in a standoff lasting months. While Cúchulainn was thus engaged, Buide mac Báin found Donn Cuailnge and drove him and twenty-four cows to Connaught. Cúchulainn killed Buide mac Báin and his twenty-four followers, but in the carnage Donn Cuailnge again ran off.

Eventually, after a pitched battle with the Ulster forces, Medb's armies were forced to retreat, but they managed to bring Donn Cuailnge back to Cruachan. He and Finnbhennach fought, and after a long and grueling battle Donn killed his rival. Mortally wounded himself, he wandered around Ireland inspiring placenames before returning to Cooley to die.

Julius Caesar, in his Gallic Wars, refers to a Gaulish ally called Valerius Donnotaurus, an interesting Celtic parallel to the Donn Tarbh of Cooley.

== Versions ==
The oldest recension of the tale is found in the Lebor na hUidre ("The Book of the Dun Cow"). This was in large part copied in the Lebor Buide Lecáin, ("The Yellow Book of Lecan"), which was completed around 1390.
