= Táin Bó Flidhais =

Tale from the Ulster Cycle of early Irish literature

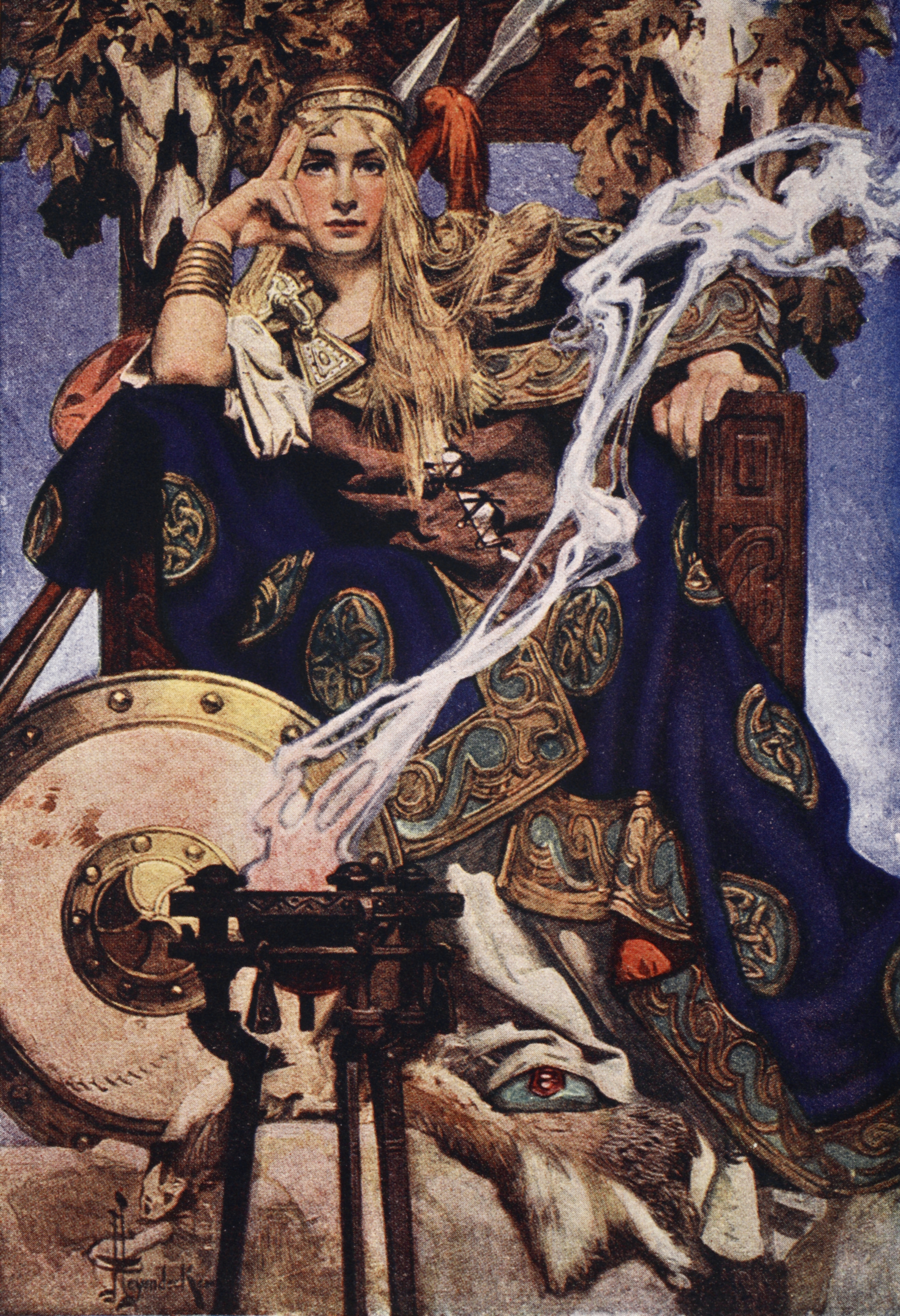
Queen Medb, Myths & Legends of the Celtic Race (1911), by T. W. Rolleston

Táin Bó Flidhais, also known as the Mayo Táin, is a tale from the Ulster Cycle of early Irish literature. It is one of a group of works known as Táin Bó, or "cattle raid" stories, the best known of which is Táin Bó Cúailnge. Táin Bó Flidhais survives in two forms, a short version from the Old Irish period and a longer version found in the 15th century Glenmasan manuscript, which is held in the Advocates Library in Edinburgh. It is believed to be a copy of an earlier manuscript from the 12th century. The early version of Táin Bó Flidhais predates the Táin Bó Cúailnge. It is named for the heroine of the tale, Flidais.

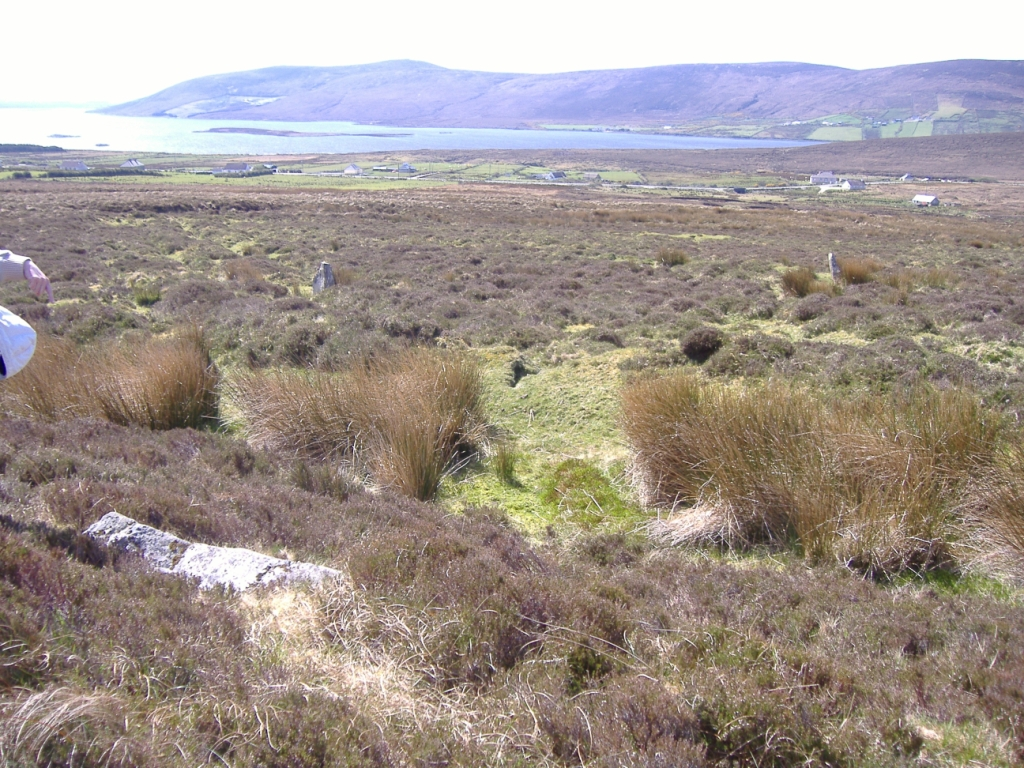
Dún Flidhais at Rathmorgan left of the hills in the background of Carrowmore Lake

== Main story ==
=== Treachery ===
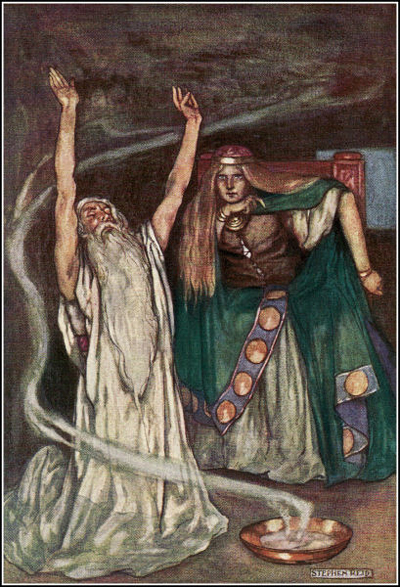
Queen Medb and the Druid

== The Mayo Táin ==
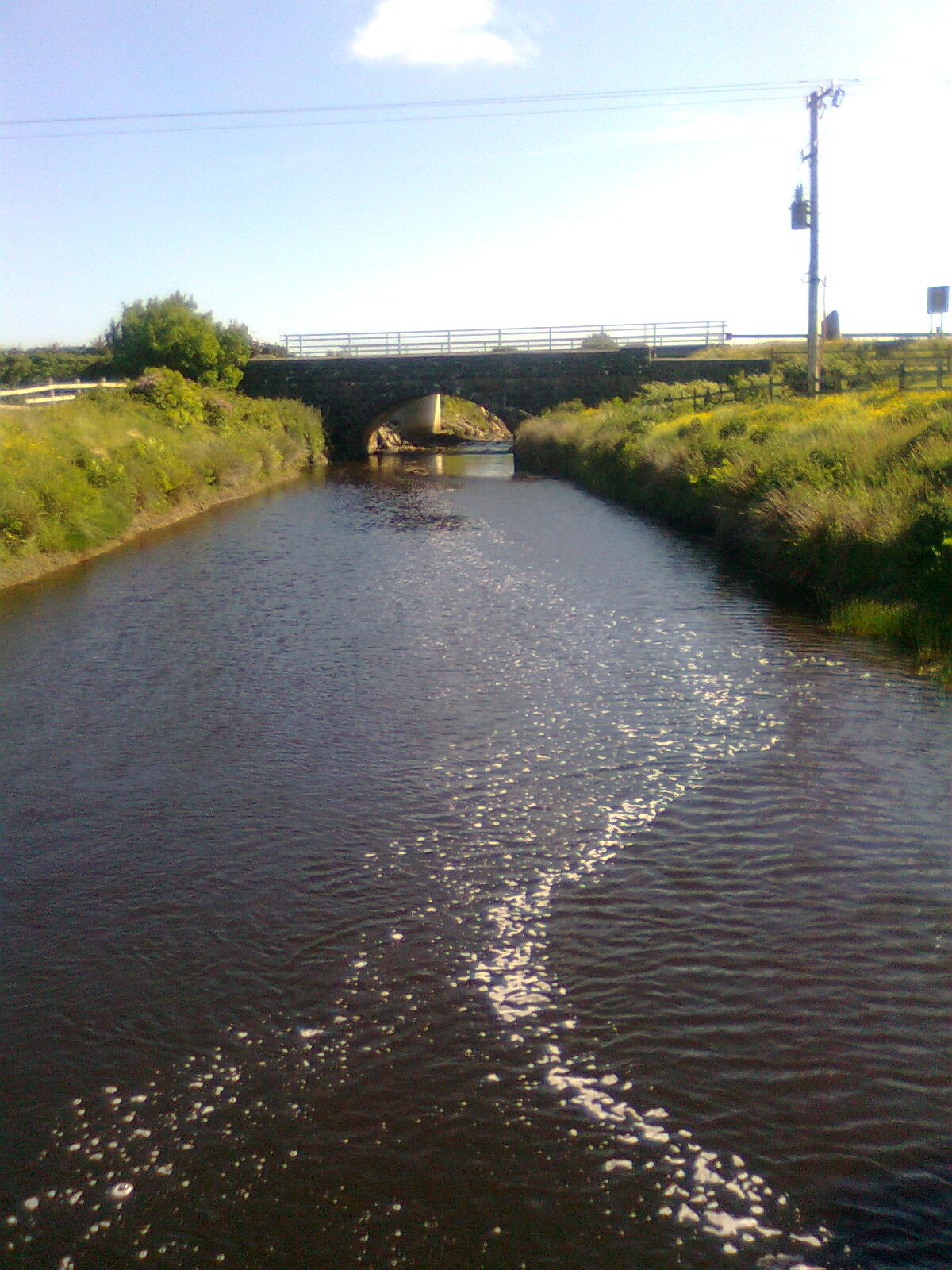
The Munhin River, Erris, County Mayo

== See also ==
- Brian Rua U'Cearbhain
- Táin Bó
