= Vincent Woods =

Irish poet and playwright (born 1960)

- Born: 1960 (age 65–66); County Leitrim, Ireland
- Education: College of Commerce, Rathmines(DIT)
- Occupation: Writer
- Employer: RTÉ
- Known for: The Arts Show

Vincent Woods (born 1960) is an Irish poet and playwright.

== Early life and education ==
Vincent Woods was born in 1962 in County Leitrim.

== Career ==
Woods lived in the United States, New Zealand, and Australia, and worked as a journalist with RTÉ, hosting The Arts Show on RTÉ Radio 1 until 1989, and then Arts Tonight.

== Works ==
His poetry collections include Lives and Miracles and The Colour of Language. Woods is a member of Aosdána. His playwriting credits include A Cry from Heaven, At the Black Pig's Dyke, John Hughdy and Tom John, and Song of the Yellow Bittern.

He wrote songs for Irish singer Mary McPartlan for her album Petticoat Loose. The songs are "Sanctuary", "Kiss the Moon" and "Petticoat Loose".

== Awards ==
In 1993 Woods won the Stewart Parker Trust Award, for At the Black Pig's Dyke

He has also won the P. J. O'Connor Award for radio drama and the M.J. McManus Prize for poetry.
