= Fosterage =

Raising another family's child

Fosterage, the practice of a family bringing up a child not their own, differs from adoption in that the child's parents, not the foster-parents, remain the acknowledged parents. In many modern western societies foster care can be organised by the state to care for children with troubled family backgrounds, usually on a temporary basis. In many pre-modern societies fosterage was a form of patronage, whereby influential families cemented political relationships by bringing up each other's children, similar to arranged marriages, also based on dynastic or alliance calculations.

This practice was once common in Ireland, Wales, and Scotland.

== Fosterage in Scotland ==
In medieval Highland society there was a system of fosterage among clan leaders, where boys and girls would leave their parents' house to be brought up in that of other chiefs, creating a fictive bond of kinship that helped cement alliances and mutual bonds of obligation.

In his A Journey to the Western Isles of Scotland (1775), writer Samuel Johnson described the fosterage custom as he saw it practised.

There still remains in the Islands, though it is passing fast away, the custom of fosterage. A Laird, a man of wealth and eminence, sends his child, either male or female, to a tacksman, or tenant, to be fostered. It is not always his own tenant, but some distant friend that obtains this honour; for an honour such a trust is very reasonably thought. The terms of fosterage seem to vary in different islands. In Mull, the father sends with his child a certain number of cows, to which the same number is added by the fosterer. The father appropriates a proportionable extent of ground, without rent, for their pasturage. If every cow brings a calf, half belongs to the fosterer, and half to the child; but if there be only one calf between two cows, it is the child's, and when the child returns to the parent, it is accompanied by all the cows given, both by the father and by the fosterer, with half of the increase of the stock by propagation. These beasts are considered as a portion, and called Macalive cattle, of which the father has the produce, but is supposed not to have the full property, but to owe the same number to the child, as a portion to the daughter, or a stock for the son.

Children continue with the fosterer perhaps six years, and cannot, where this is the practice, be considered as burdensome. The fosterer, if he gives four cows, receives likewise four, and has, while the child continues with him, grass for eight without rent, with half the calves, and all the milk, for which he pays only four cows when he dismisses his Dalt, for that is the name for a foster child.

Fosterage is, I believe, sometimes performed upon more liberal terms. Our friend, the young Laird of Col, was fostered by Macsweyn of Grissipol. Macsweyn then lived a tenant to Sir James Macdonald in the Isle of Sky; and therefore Col, whether he sent him cattle or not, could grant him no land. The Dalt, however, at his return, brought back a considerable number of Macalive cattle, and of the friendship so formed there have been good effects. When Macdonald raised his rents, Macsweyn was, like other tenants, discontented, and, resigning his farm, removed from Sky to Col, and was established at Grissipol.

== Fosterage in medieval Iceland ==
Fosterage or "fostering" is frequently referred to in the medieval Sagas of Icelanders. Original family ties and rights of inheritance were not affected, nor was it required for the fostered child to be an orphan or for the biological father to be deceased. Moreover, the fostering of another man's child was regarded as a source of honor to the birth father; and conventionally the fostering party was of inferior social status to the biological father. An exception to this convention is found in Njáls saga, where Njáll Þorgeirsson, a prominent man, fosters Hoskuld, the son of Thrain Sigfusson, after the death of Thrain in battle.

Portions of Ireland, Scotland and the Hebrides were ruled for long periods of time by Norse invaders during the Middle Ages; but it is unknown which culture was the original source of the custom of fosterage.

== Fosterage in medieval Ireland ==
Fosterage in Ireland was common across classes in the medieval period for both boys and girls. This was a contractual relationship and there were laws about how it worked, but foster children, parents and siblings felt love for each other.

== Literary fosterage ==
In Ancient Ireland, ollams taught children either for payment or for no compensation. Children were taught a particular trade and treated like family; their original family ties were often severed.

== Fosterage in other cultures ==
There was a similar custom in the Caucasus, called Atalik - ru:Аталычество.
