= Ailill mac Máta =

Legendary Irish king

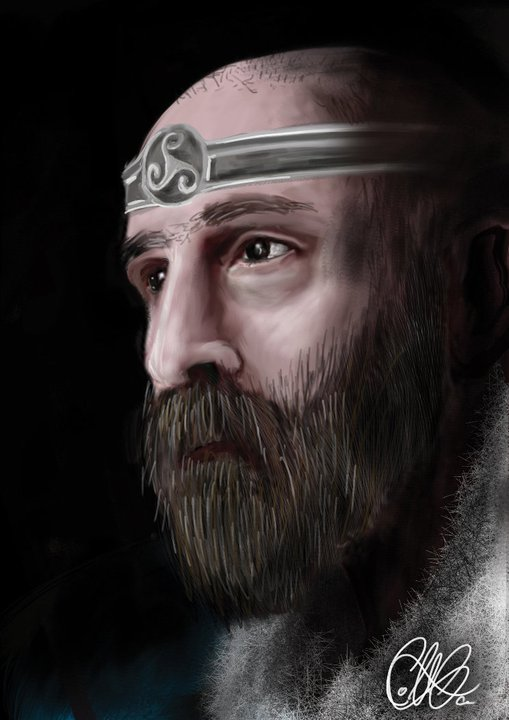
Illustration of Ailill mac Máta (Cormac McCann, 2013)

Ailill mac Máta is the king of the Connachta and the husband of queen Medb in the Ulster Cycle of Irish mythology. He rules from Cruachan (Rathcroghan in County Roscommon).

== Family background, marriage and offspring ==
The sagas explain mac Máta as a matronymic: his mother is Máta Muirisc, daughter of Mága, of the Fir Ol nEchmacht, a tribal grouping of Connacht, through whom he claimed the throne of the Connachta. His father is Rus Ruad, king of the Laigin, whose other sons include Cairbre Nia Fer, king of Tara, Find Fili, who succeeded him as king of the Laigin, and in some texts Cathbad, chief druid of Conchobar mac Nessa of the Ulaid. The Táin Bó Cúailnge says Medb chose him as husband, ahead of Find, Cairbre and Conchobar, because he alone among them was without meanness, jealousy or fear.

A late saga, Cath Boinde, tells a different story. It says Ailill was the grandson of Medb's sister Ele, and came to Cruachan as a young child to be raised by Medb, who was already reigning there with her then-husband Eochaid Dála. He grew up to be a fine warrior, and became chief of Medb's bodyguard, and her lover. Eochaid tried to expel Ailill from Connacht, but Medb would not allow it. He then challenged him to single combat, and lost. Ailill then became Medb's husband and king of the Connachta.

Ailill and Medb had seven sons, all called Maine. They originally had other names, but after Medb asked a druid which of her sons would kill Conchobar, and received the reply "Maine", they were all renamed as follows:

- Fedlimid became Maine Athramail ("like his father")
- Cairbre became Maine Máthramail ("like his mother")
- Eochaid became Maine Andoe ("the swift")
- Fergus became Maine Taí ("the silent")
- Cet became Maine Mórgor ("of great duty")
- Sin became Maine Mílscothach ("honey-speech")
- Dáire became Maine Móepirt ("beyond description")

The prophecy was fulfilled when Maine Andoe went on to kill Conchobar, son of Arthur, son of Bruide — not Conchobar mac Nessa of the Ulaid, as Medb had assumed the druid meant. Medb and Ailill also had a daughter, Findabair.

== Cattle raid ==
Ailill led the Táin Bó Cúailnge (cattle raid of Cooley) against the Ulaid, an expedition intended to steal their prize bull Donn Cúailnge. The prologue to the later version of the Táin says this was a result of a dispute between Ailill and Medb over who was wealthier. Their wealth was equal, except for one thing: the bull Finnbhennach, who was born into Medb's herd, but thought it was beneath his dignity to be owned by a woman and transferred himself into Ailill's ownership. The only bull his equal in Ireland was Donn Cúailnge, so it was decided to acquire him for Medb to restore their equality.

Fergus mac Róich, a former king of the Ulaid in exile and Medb's lover, was chosen to lead the way for the army. On the way the army split in two. Ailill led one party, and Medb and Fergus, leading the other, took the opportunity to sleep together. But Ailill had sent his charioteer, Cuillius, to spy on them, and Cuillius stole Fergus's sword while he was in flagrante. Ailill decided to forgive Medb on the grounds that she was probably trying to ensure Fergus' loyalty, and kept Fergus's sword safe but hidden.

Because of a divine curse on the Ulaid, the invasion was opposed only by the teenage Ulaid hero Cú Chulainn, who held up the army's advance by demanding single combat at fords. Medb and Ailill offered their daughter Findabair in marriage to a series of heroes as payment for fighting Cú Chulainn, but all were defeated. Nevertheless, they secured the bull. After Conchobar finally assembled the Ulaid's army, Ailill gave Fergus back his sword and the final battle began. The Connachta were forced to retreat, but Donn Cúailnge was brought back to Cruachan, where he fought Finnbhennach, killed him, and died of his wounds.

== Death ==
Ailill managed to keep his promise to Medb to be without jealousy, despite her many lovers, until he saw her bathing in a lake with Fergus. His blind brother Lugaid Dalléces was nearby, so Ailill told him a hart and a doe were playing in the lake, and challenged him to kill them with a spear. Lugaid threw the spear and killed Fergus.

Late in life, the Ulaid hero Conall Cernach came to stay with Ailill and Medb, as theirs was the only household in Ireland that could satisfy his enormous appetite. Medb found Ailill was seeing another woman and demanded Conall kill him, something he was happy to do in revenge for Fergus. Ailill was killed on 1 May Lá Bealtaine which was on a Tuesday. Conall then fled, but the men of the Connachta pursued and killed him at the ford of Ballyconnell, County Cavan.

== Texts ==
- Ferchuitred Medba, a.k.a. Cath Bóinde: Medb's Men, or the Battle of the Boyne
- Fled Bricrend: Bricriu's Feast
- Aisling Óenguso: The Dream of Óengus
- Táin Bó Fraích: The Cattle Raid of Fráech
- Táin Bó Regamain: The Cattle Raid of Regamon
- Táin Bó Dartada: The Raid for Dartaid's Cattle
- Táin Bó Flidhais or The Mayo Táin: The Driving of Flidais's Cattle
- Echtra Nerae: The Adventures of Nera
- Táin Bó Cuailnge: The Cattle Raid of Cooley Recension 1, Recension 2
- Aided Fergusa meic Róig: The Death of Fergus mac Róich
