= Conchobar mac Nessa =

Legendary Irish king

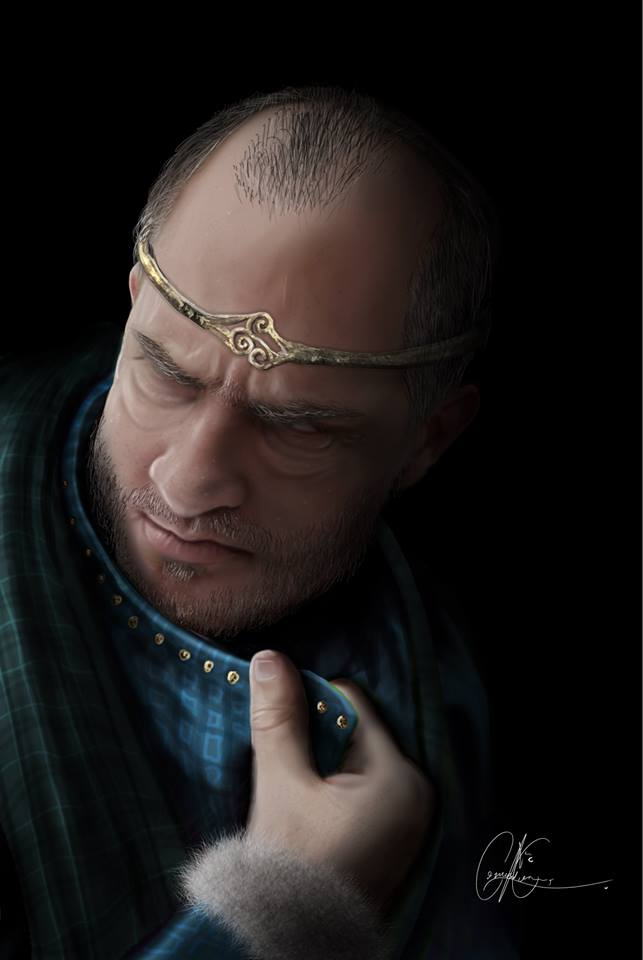
Artistic rendition of Conchobar's portrait (Cormac McCann)

Conchobar mac Nessa (son of Ness) is the king of Ulster in the Ulster Cycle of Irish mythology. He rules from Emain Macha (Navan Fort, near Armagh). He is usually said to be the son of the High King Fachtna Fáthach, although in some stories his father is the druid Cathbad, and he is usually known by his matronymic, mac Nessa: his mother is Ness, daughter of Eochaid Sálbuide, King of Ulster.

Conchobar was an important figure in the Ulster Cycle, appearing in the Táin Bó Cúailnge and a number of other stories where he is depicted as a good king, though he is depicted as a tyrant and villain in the legend of Deirdre of the Sorrows.

== Legendary biography ==
=== Birth ===
There are several versions of how Conchobar was conceived. In the earliest, Ness, daughter of Eochaid Sálbuide, the then king of Ulster, asks the druid Cathbad what it is an auspicious time for. Cathbad replies, "for begetting a king on a queen". There are no other men around, so Ness takes Cathbad to bed and she conceives a son. In a later version, Ness is brought up by twelve foster-fathers, and while all twelve are at a feast, Cathbad, leading a fian or landless war-band, attacks the house and kills them all. Eochaid is unable to avenge them as the culprit cannot be identified, so Ness forms her own fian to hunt Cathbad down. But while she is bathing alone in a pool, Cathbad appears, stands between her and her weapons, and bares his sword. He spares her life on the condition that she becomes his wife. They settle near a river called Conchobar, and Ness soon conceives a son, but in this version, the father is the High King Fachtna Fáthach, who is Ness's lover. As she and Cathbad set out to visit Fachtna, Ness goes into labour. Cathbad tells her if she can manage not to give birth until the following day, her son will be a great king and have everlasting fame, for he will be born on the same day as Jesus Christ. Ness sits on a flagstone by the river Conchobar, and the following morning gives birth. The baby falls into the river, but Cathbad lifts him out, names him Conchobar after the river, and brings him up as his own son.

=== Conchobar becomes king ===
By the time Conchobar is seven, Fergus mac Róich is king of Ulster and falls in love with Ness. She agrees to become his wife, on one condition: that Fergus allows Conchobar to be king for a year, so his children will be called the sons of a king (under Medieval Irish law inheritance passed through the male line, and only those who had a king as a male-line ancestor were eligible for kingship). The nobles of Ulster advise Fergus that this will not affect his standing with them, as the boy will be king in name only, so he agrees. But Conchobar, advised by his mother, rules so well that by the end of the year it's decided he should be king permanently. Fergus makes an alliance with the new High King, Eochu Feidlech, and they make war on Ulster. After a series of bloody battles, Conchobar makes overtures for peace. Fergus is offered land, the Champion's Portion at Emain Macha, and the position of Conchobar's heir. Conchobar demands compensation from Eochu for the killing of his father, Fachtna Fáthach, and is granted land, status and the High King's daughter in marriage.

=== Marriages and family ===
Conchobar marries several of Eochu's daughters. Medb, later queen of Connacht, is the first. She bears him a son called Amalgad, but soon leaves him.

Her sister Eithne conceives a son by him, but Medb murders her by drowning her in a stream. Her son Furbaide is delivered by posthumous Caesarian section.

Mugain bears him a son called Glaisne and remains his chief wife.

The mother of Conchobar's eldest son, Cormac Cond Longas, is either Eochu's daughter Clothru or Conchobar's own mother Ness. Cormac is given to Fergus mac Róich to foster.

His other sons include Cúscraid Mend Macha and Folloman. His daughter Fedelm Noíchrothach marries Cairbre Nia Fer, King of Tara, and they have a son, Erc, and a daughter, Achall.

Conchobar has two sisters, Findchóem and Deichtine. Findchóem marries the poet Amergin, and they have a son, Conall Cernach. Deichtine is the mother of Cú Chulainn, by either her mortal husband Sualtam or the god Lugh, making Conchobar his uncle.

=== Deirdre ===
When Conchobar is visiting the house of his storyteller Fedlimid mac Daill, Fedlimid's wife gives birth to a daughter. Cathbad, now Conchobar's chief druid, prophesies that she will be so beautiful that kings will go to war over her, and she will bring nothing but sorrow. The child is named Deirdre, and Conchobar decides to have her brought up in seclusion from men, intending to marry her when she comes of age. However, she elopes with a young warrior called Naoise. Along with Naoise's two brothers, the couple go into hiding and are eventually forced to flee to Scotland. Wherever they settle, the local king tries to have the brothers killed so he can have Deirdre for himself, and they have to move on. Eventually, Conchobar tracks them down to a remote island and sends Fergus to them with his guarantee of safe passage home. On the way home he arranges for Fergus to be separated from his charges by having him invited to a feast, so they are escorted back to Emain Macha by Fergus's son Fiachu. When they arrive, Fiachu, Naoise and his brothers are murdered on Conchobar's orders by Éogan mac Durthacht, and Deirdre is forced to marry Conchobar.

Fergus, outraged by the death of his son and the betrayal of his honour, makes war against Conchobar, alongside Cormac Cond Longas, who sides with his foster-father against his father, and Dubthach Dóeltenga. They burn Emain and slaughter the maidens of Ulster, before going into exile with Medb and her husband Ailill in Connacht.

Deirdre lives with Conchobar for a year, but during that time she never smiles, rarely eats or sleeps, and refuses to be comforted. Conchobar asks her what it is she hates, and she replies, "you, and Éogan mac Durthacht." Conchobar gives her to Éogan. The next day, riding in Éogan's chariot, she commits suicide by dashing her head against a stone.

=== The Cattle Raid of Cooley ===
When Medb raises an army from four of the five provinces of Ireland and launches an invasion of Ulster to steal the bull Donn Cúailnge in the Táin Bó Cúailnge, Conchobar, like all the Ulstermen but Cú Chulainn, is unable to fight, disabled by the curse of Macha. Cú Chulainn fights a series of single combats against Connacht champions, hoping to give the Ulstermen time to recover and take the field.

Eventually, Cú Chulainn's father, Sualtam, comes to Conchobar at Emain Macha to warn him of the devastation the Connacht army is creating and demand he raise his army before it's too late. Conchobar and his druids agree that Sualtam should be put to death for breaking the protocol of the court - no-one is permitted to speak before Conchobar but the druids - and Sualtam runs out, but falls and decapitates himself on the sharpened edge of his shield. His severed head is brought back in on his shield, still crying out his warning. Conchobar raises his army and leads them into battle. During the fighting, Fergus has him at his mercy, but Cormac Cond Longas prevents his foster-father from killing his biological father, and Fergus strikes off the top of three hills instead. Medb is eventually forced to retreat by Cú Chulainn, but manages to bring the bull back to Connacht, where it fights her husband Ailill's bull Finnbhennach, kills it, and dies of exhaustion.

=== The Battle of Ros na Ríg ===
After the Táin, Conchobar falls ill and doesn't eat or sleep. The Ulaid ask Cathbad to find out what's wrong with their king. Conchobar tells Cathbad that he is ill because the other four provinces of Ireland have made war against him with impunity. Although he was victorious against Ailill and Medb, neither of them was killed in the battle, and he still lost his bull. He wants to make war against Connacht, but it is now winter, so Cathbad advises him to wait until summer when his men and horses will be fresh and energetic, and in the meantime, call on all his foreign allies to bring reinforcements. He sends word to Conall Cernach, who is raising tribute in the Scottish islands, and he raises a great fleet of the Ulaid's allies in Scandinavia and the Faroe Islands and brings them home to Ulster.

In response to this build-up, the other provinces mobilise. Eochu mac Luchta, king of Munster, convinces Ailill and Medb, very much against Medb's better judgement, to offer reparations to Conchobar. Ailill sends a man the Ulaid have reason to mistrust as their envoy to make the offer. Conchobar rejects the offer and says he will not be satisfied until he is able to pitch his tent anywhere in Ireland. When asked where he wants to pitch his tent that night, he selects Ros na Ríg (Rosnaree) on the River Boyne. A battle ensues at Ros na Ríg between the Ulaid on one side, and on the other side the kingdom of Meath, led by Conchobar's son-in-law Cairpre Nia Fer, king of Tara, and the Gailióin of Leinster, led by their king Find mac Rossa. The battle goes badly for the Ulaid until Conall Cernach joins the fray because the wavering Ulstermen are too scared of him to retreat. Conall kills a thousand men in the battle. Cairpre Nia Fer kills 800 before Cú Chulainn kills him with a spear thrown from a distance, and then beheads him before his body hits the ground. The Gailióin retreat and the Ulaid take Tara. Erc, Cairpre's son and Conchobar's grandson, is installed as the new king of Tara. He swears allegiance to Conchobar and is given Cú Chulainn's daughter Fínscoth in marriage.

=== Death ===
The story of Conchobar's death was a popular medieval tale and is recorded in many manuscripts which give different versions of the story.

Conchobar is eventually killed as a result of a wound inflicted by the Connacht warrior Cet mac Mágach. Cet had stolen one of Ulster's trophies of battle, the petrified brain of Mesgegra, king of Leinster, and shoots it from his sling so it embeds itself in Conchobar's head; this is supposed to have taken place at Baile Ath in Urchair, (Ardnurcher). Conchobor's physicians are unable to remove it, but sew up the wound and tell the king he will survive so long as he doesn't get excited or over-exert himself. Seven reasonably peaceful years later, Conchobar is told of the death of Christ and becomes so angry that the brain bursts from his head, and he dies. The blood from the wound baptises him as a Christian, and his soul goes to heaven. While this account of his death has been superficially Christianised, it also bears strong resemblances to the Scandinavian myth of Thor's fight against Hrungnir, suggesting either a common origin of the two episodes or a later borrowing during the era of Viking influence in Ireland.

The Ulstermen invite his son Cormac Cond Longas, still in exile in Connacht, to succeed him as king, but on his way to Emain Macha Cormac is forced to break his geasa or taboos, and is killed in battle at Da Choca's Hostel. On Conall Cernach's recommendation the kingship is then given to Conchobar's other son, Cúscraid Mend Macha.

== See also ==
- Brain balls

== Links to texts in translation ==
- Tidings of Conchobar son of Ness
- The Birth of Conchobar
- Medb's Men, or the Battle of the Boyne
- The Birth of Cú Chulainn
- The Exile of the Sons of Usnech
- The Battle of Ros na Ríg
- The Death of Conchobar

== See also ==
- Irish mythology in popular culture
