= Ulster Cycle =

Grouping of Irish myths

The Ulster Cycle (Irish: an Rúraíocht), formerly known as the Red Branch Cycle, is a body of medieval Irish heroic legends and sagas of the Ulaid. It is set far in the past, in what is now eastern Ulster and northern Leinster, particularly counties Armagh, Down and Louth. It focuses on the mythical Ulster king Conchobar mac Nessa and his court at Emain Macha, the hero Cú Chulainn, and their conflict with the Connachta and queen Medb. The longest and most important tale is the epic Táin Bó Cúailnge (Cattle Raid of Cooley). The Ulster Cycle is one of the four 'cycles' of Irish mythology and legend, along with the Mythological Cycle, the Fianna Cycle and the Kings' Cycle.

== Ulster Cycle stories ==
The Ulster Cycle stories are set in and around the reign of King Conchobar mac Nessa, who rules the Ulaid from Emain Macha (now Navan Fort near Armagh). The most prominent hero of the cycle is Conchobar's nephew, Cú Chulainn. The Ulaid are most often in conflict with the Connachta, led by their queen, Medb, her husband, Ailill, and their ally Fergus mac Róich, a former king of the Ulaid in exile. The longest and most important story of the cycle is the Táin Bó Cúailnge or "Cattle Raid of Cooley", in which Medb raises an enormous army to invade the Cooley peninsula and steal the Ulaid's prize bull, Donn Cúailnge, opposed only by the seventeen-year-old Cú Chulainn. In the Mayo Táin, the Táin Bó Flidhais, a white cow known as the 'Maol', which is the object of desire. One of the better known stories is the tragedy of Deirdre, source of plays by W. B. Yeats and J. M. Synge. Other stories tell of the births, courtships and deaths of the characters and of the conflicts between them.

The stories are written in Old and Middle Irish, mostly in prose, interspersed with occasional verse passages, with the earliest extant versions dated to the 12th century. The tone is terse, violent, sometimes comic, and mostly realistic, although supernatural elements intrude from time to time. Cú Chulainn in particular has superhuman fighting skills, the result of his semi-divine ancestry, and when particularly aroused his battle frenzy or ríastrad transforms him into an unrecognisable monster who knows neither friend nor foe. Evident deities like Lugh, the Morrígan, Aengus and Midir also make occasional appearances.

Unlike the majority of early Irish historical tradition, which presents ancient Ireland as largely united under a succession of High Kings, the stories of the Ulster Cycle depict a country with no effective central authority, divided into local and provincial kingdoms often at war with each other. The civilisation depicted is a pagan, pastoral one ruled by a warrior aristocracy. Bonds between aristocratic families are cemented by fosterage of each other's children. Wealth is reckoned in cattle. Warfare mainly takes the form of cattle raids, or single combats between champions at fords. The characters' actions are sometimes restricted by religious taboos known as geasa.

=== Manuscripts ===
The stories are preserved in manuscripts of the 12th to 15th centuries but, in many cases, are believed to be much older. The language of the earliest stories is dateable to the 8th century, and events and characters are referred to in poems dating to the 7th.

The earliest extant manuscripts of the Ulster Cycle are Lebor na hUidre, "The Book of the Dun Cow", dating to no later than 1106, and The Book of Leinster, compiled around 1160.

== Chronology ==
The events of the cycle are traditionally supposed to take place around the time of Christ. The stories of Conchobar's birth and death are synchronised with the birth and death of Christ, and the Lebor Gabála Érenn dates the Táin Bó Cúailnge and the birth and death of Cú Chulainn to the reign of the High King Conaire Mor, who it says was a contemporary of the Roman emperor Augustus (27 BC – AD 14). Some stories, including the Táin, refer to Cairbre Nia Fer as the king of Tara, implying that no High King is in place at the time.

The presence of the Connachta as the Ulaid's enemies is an apparent anachronism: the Connachta were traditionally said to have been the descendants of Conn Cétchathach, who is supposed to have lived several centuries later. Later stories use the name Cóiced Ol nEchmacht as an earlier name for the province of Connacht to get around this problem. However, the chronology of early Irish historical tradition is an artificial attempt by Christian monks to synchronise native traditions with classical and biblical history, and it is possible that historical wars between the Ulaid and the Connachta have been chronologically misplaced.

== Historicity ==
Along with the Lebor Gabála Érenn, elements of the Ulster Cycle were for centuries regarded as historical in Ireland, and the antiquity of these records was a matter of politicised debate; modern scholars have generally taken a more critical stance.

Some scholars of the 19th and early 20th centuries, such as Eugene O'Curry and Kuno Meyer, believed that the stories and characters of the Ulster Cycle were essentially historical; T. F. O'Rahilly was inclined to believe the stories were entirely mythical and the characters euhemerised gods; and Ernst Windisch thought that the cycle, while largely imaginary, contains little genuine myth. Elements of the tales are reminiscent of classical descriptions of Celtic societies in Gaul, Galatia and Britain. Warriors fight with swords, spears and shields, and ride in two-horse chariots, driven by skilled charioteers drawn from the lower classes. They take and preserve the heads of slain enemies, and boast of their valour at feasts, with the bravest awarded the curadmír or "champion's portion", the choicest cut of meat. Kings are advised by druids (Old Irish druí, plural druíd), and poets have great power and privilege. These elements led scholars such as Kenneth H. Jackson to conclude that the stories of the Ulster Cycle preserved authentic Celtic traditions from the pre-Christian Iron Age. Other scholars have challenged that conclusion, stressing similarities with early medieval Irish society and the influence of classical literature, while considering the possibility that the stories may contain genuinely ancient material from oral tradition. J. P. Mallory thus found the archaeological record and linguistic evidence to generally disfavour the presence of Iron Age remnants in the Ulster and Mythological Cycles, but emphasised the links to the Corlea Trackway in the earlier Tochmarc Étaíne as a notable exception.

It is probable that the oldest strata of tales are those involving the complex relationship between the Ulaid and the Érainn, represented in the Ulster Cycle by Cú Roí and the Clanna Dedad, and later by Conaire Mór. It was observed a century ago by Eoin MacNeill and other scholars that the historical Ulaid, as represented by the Dál Fiatach, were apparently related to the Clanna Dedad. T. F. O'Rahilly later concluded that the Ulaid were in fact a branch of the Érainn. A number of the Érainn appear to have been powerful Kings of Tara, with a secondary base of power at the now lost Temair Luachra "Tara of the Rushes" in West Munster, where some action in the Ulster Cycle takes place and may even have been transplanted from the midland Tara. Additionally it may be noteworthy that the several small cycles of tales involving the early dominance of the Érainn in Ireland generally predate the majority of the Ulster Cycle tales in content, if not in their final forms, and are believed to be of a substantially more pre-Christian character. Several of these do not even mention the famous characters from the Ulster Cycle, and those that do may have been slightly reworked after its later expansion with the Táin and rise in popularity.

== Texts ==
Earliest strata

- Conailla Medb míchuru "Medb has entered evil contracts" (7th-century poem attributed to Luccreth moccu Chiara)
- The lost manuscript Cín Dromma Snechtai, associated with Bangor, is thought to have included versions of these five texts:
  - Compert Con Culainn "The Birth of Cú Chulainn"
  - Compert Conchobuir "The Birth of Conchobor"
  - Fíl and grían Glinne Aí
  - Forfess fer Falchae "Night-watch against the men of Falgae"
  - Verba Scathaige "The words of Scáthach"
- Material related to Cú Roí, such as Amra Con Roí and Aided Con Roi
- References in Old Irish law, e.g. Cethairslicht Athgabálae.

Here follows a list of tales which are assigned to the Ulster Cycle, although it does not claim to be exhaustive. The classification according to 'genre' followed here is merely a convenient tool to bring clarity to a large body of texts, but it is not the only possible one nor does it necessarily reflect contemporary approaches of classifying texts.

Compert Birth

- Compert Con Culainn "The Birth of Cú Chulainn"
- Compert Conchobuir "The Birth of Conchobor"

Wooings and elopements

- Aided Conrói maic Dáiri
- Aithed Emere (le Tuir nGlesta) "The Elopement of Emer (with Tuir Glesta)"
- Aislinge Óenguso "The Dream of Óengus"
- Longes mac n-Uislenn "The Exile of the sons of Uisliu"
- Oided mac n-Uisneg
- Tochmarc Emire
- Tochmarc Étaíne
- Tochmarc Ferbe (or Fís Conchobair)
- Tochmarc Luaine 7 aided Arthirne (second half of the 12th century)
- Tochmarc Treblainne

Feasts

- Da Gábail int sída "On the Taking of the (síd-)Mound"
- Echtra Nerai
- Scéla mucce maic Dathó "The Tale of Mac Da Thó's Pig"
- Mesca Ulad "The Intoxication of the Ulstermen"
- Fled Bricrenn "The Feast of Bricriu"
- Fled Bricrenn 7 Longes mac n-Duil Dermait
- Bruiden da Chocae "The Hostel of Da Choca"
- Togal Bruidne Da Derga "The Destruction of Da Derga's Hostel"
  - De Shíl Chonairi Móir "On the Descendants of Conaire Mór"
  - De Maccaib Conaire "On the sons of Conaire (Mór)"

Cath 'Battle'

- Cath Airtig "The Battle of Airtech"
- Cath Aenaig Macha "The Battle of the Assembly of Macha"
- Cath Cumair "The Battle of Cumar" or Cath Atha Comair
- Cath Findchorad "The Battle of Findchorad"
- Cath Leitrich Ruide "The Battle of Leititr Ruide"
- Cath Ruis na Ríg "The Battle of Rosnaree"
- Cogadh Fheargusa agus Chonchobhair "The Battle of Fergus and Conchobor"
- Forfess fer Falchae "Night-watch against the men of Falgae"
- Comracc Con Chulainn re Senbecc "The Combat of Cú Chulainn with Senbecc"
- Cathcharpat Serda "The Scythed Battle-Chariot"

Táin Bó 'Cattle-raid'

- Táin Bó Cúailnge I
- Táin Bó Cúailnge II
- Táin Bó Cúailnge III
- De Faillsigud Tána Bó Cuailnge "On the finding of the Táin Bó Cúailnge"
- Táin Bó Dartada "The Cattle Raid of Dartaid"
- Táin Bó Flidhais I "The Cattle Raid of Flidais" I
- Táin Bó Flidhais II "The Cattle Raid of Flidais" II
- Tain Bó Fraích "The Raid of Fróech's Cattle"
- Tain Bó Regamain "The Cattle Raid of Regamon"
- Tain Bó Regamna "The Cattle Raid of Regamain"

Remscéla (Fore-tales) to the Táin Bó Cúailnge

- Ces Noínden, In Ceas Naigen
- De Chophur in Dá Mucado
- Echtra Nerai
- see further: Táin Bó Cúailnge

Aided "Violent death"

- Aided Chonchobuir "The Death of Conchobor"
- Aided Áenfir Aífe "The Death of Aífe's Only Son"
- Cuchulinn 7 Conlaech "Cú Chulainn and Conla"
- Aided Con Culainn or Brislech Mór Maige Muirthemne
- Aided Ceit maic Mágach "The Death of Cét mac Mágach"
- Aided Cheltchair mac Uthechair "The Death of Celtchar mac Uthechair"
- Aided Derbforgaill "The Death of Derbforgaill"
- Aided Fergusa maic Roig "The Death of Fergus mac Róig"
- Imthechta Tuaithe Luachra 7 Aided Fergusa "The Proceedings of the People of Luchra and the Death of Fergus (mac Léti)"
- Aided Guill meic Garbada ocus Aided Gairb Glinne Ríge
- Aided Laegairi Buadaig "The Death of Loegaire Buadach"
- Goire Conaill Chernaig 7 Aided Aillela 7 Conall Chernaig "The Cherishing of Conall Cernach and the Deaths of Ailill and Conall Cernach"
- Aided Meidbe "The Death of Medb"
- Ferchuitred Medba, Cath Boinne

Miscellaneous

- Verba Scathaige "The words of Scáthach"
- Scéla Conchobair maic Nessa "The Story of Conchobor mac Nessa"
- Siaburcharpat Con Culaind "Cú Chulainn's Phantom Chariot"
- Foglaim Con Culainn "Cú Chulainn's Training"
- Serglige Con Culainn "The Wasting Sickness of Cú Chulainn"
- Immacaldam in dá thuarad "The Colloquy of the Two Sages"
- Talland Étair "The Siege of Howth"
- Cath Étair "The Battle of Howth"
- Tromdámh Guaire (or Imthecht na Tromdáime)
- Lánellach Tigi Rích 7 Ruirech "The Full Complement of the House of a King and an Overlord"
- Fochonn Loingse Fergusa meic Róig "The cause of the exile of Fergus mac Róig"
- Nede 7 Caier "Néde and Caier"
- Echtra Fergusa maic Léti"The Adventures of Fergus mac Léti"

== Texts in translation ==
Most of the important Ulster Cycle tales can be found in the following publications:

- Thomas Kinsella, The Táin, Oxford University Press, 1969
- Stephen Dunford, Táin Bó Flidhais or The Mayo Táin, Enniscrone, 2008
- Jeffrey Gantz, Early Irish Myths and Sagas, Penguin, 1981
- Tom Peete Cross & Clark Harris Slover, Ancient Irish Tales, Henry Holt & Company, 1936 (reprinted by Barnes & Noble, 1996)
- John T Koch & John Carey, The Celtic Heroic Age, Celtic Studies Publications, 2000
- Kuno Meyer, The Death-Tales of the Ulster Heroes, Todd Lecture Series, 1906
- A H Leahy, Heroic Romances of Ireland, 2 vols, 1905–1906 (Online at Sacred Texts)

=== Online translations ===
- The Martial Career of Conghal Cláiringhnech
- The Birth of Conchobar
- Tidings of Conchobar son of Ness
- The War of Fergus and Conchobar
- Medb's Men, or the Battle of the Boyne
- The Conception of Conall Cernach
- The Birth of Cú Chulainn
- The Wooing of Emer
- The Death of Aífe's Only Son
- The Story of Mac Dathó's Pig Archived 25 September 2007 at the Wayback Machine
- Bricriu's Feast
- The Exile of the Sons of Usnech
- The Dream of Óengus
- The Cattle Raid of Fráech
- The Raid for the Cattle of Regamon
- The Raid for Dartaid's Cattle
- The Driving of Flidais's Cattle
- The Courtship of Ferb Book of Leinster version; Egerton version
- The Adventures of Nera
- The Cattle Raid of Regamna
- The Debility of the Ulstermen
- The Cattle Raid of Cooley Recension 1; Recension 2
- The Battle of Ross na Ríg
- The Death of Cú Roí
- The Sick-Bed of Cuchulain
- The Pursuit of Gruaidh Ghriansholus
- The Destruction of Da Derga's Hostel
- The Death of Celtchar mac Uthechair
- The Affliction of the Ulstermen
- The Colloquy of the Two Sages
- The Death of Cú Chulainn
- The Death of Cet mac Mágach
- The Death of Lóegaire Búadach
- The Death of Conchobar
- The Battle of Airtech
- The Death of Fergus mac Róich
- The Violent Death of Medb
- The Phantom Chariot of Cú Chulainn
- The Revealing of the Táin Bó Cúailnge

== Adaptations ==
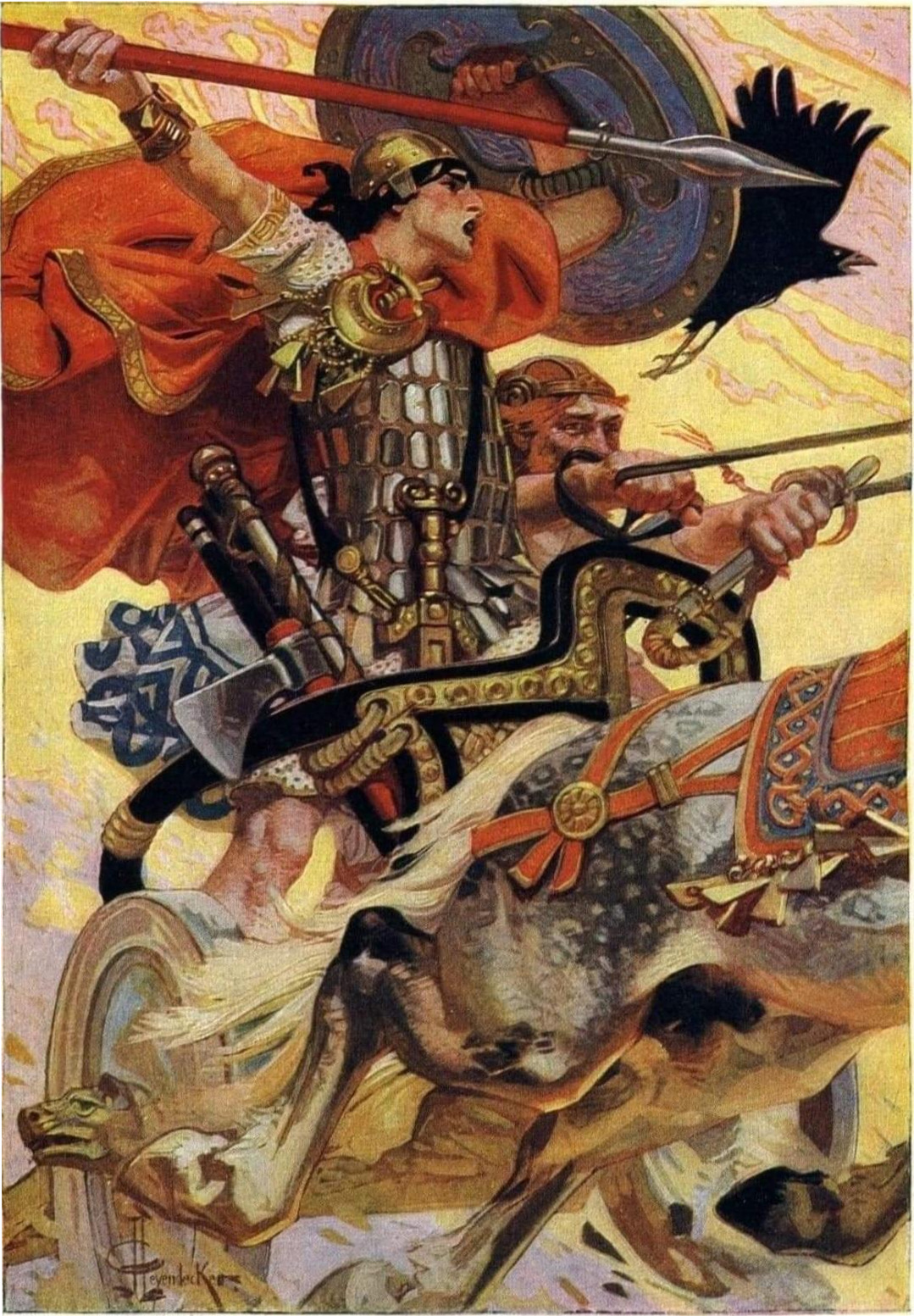
"Cuchulain in Battle", illustration by J. C. Leyendecker in T. W. Rolleston's Myths & Legends of the Celtic Race, 1911

The Ulster Cycle provided material for Irish writers of the Gaelic revival around the turn of the 20th century. Augusta, Lady Gregory's Cuchulain of Muirthemne (1902) retold most of the important stories of the cycle, as did Eleanor Hull for younger readers in The Boys' Cuchulain (1904). William Butler Yeats wrote a series of plays – On Baile's Strand (1904), Deirdre (1907), The Green Helmet (1910), At the Hawk's Well (1917), The Only Jealousy of Emer (1919) and The Death of Cuchulain (1939) – and a poem, Cuchulain's Fight with the Sea (1892), based on the legends, and completed the late John Millington Synge's unfinished play Deirdre of the Sorrows (1910), in collaboration with Synge's widow Molly Allgood.

Literary adaptations of the 20th and 21st centuries include Rosemary Sutcliff's children's novel The Hound of Ulster (1963), Morgan Llywelyn's Red Branch (1989), Patricia Finney's novel A Shadow of Gulls (1977), and Vincent Woods' play A Cry from Heaven (2005). Randy Lee Eickhoff has also created a series of six novelistic translations and retellings, beginning with The Raid (2000).

Parts of the cycle have been adapted as webcomics, including Patrick Brown's Ness (2007–2008) and The Cattle Raid of Cooley (2008–2015); and M.K. Reed's unfinished About a Bull (2011–2013) based around Queen Medb. The myth of Cú Chulainn was also adapted into graphic novels such as An Táin (2006) by Colmán Ó Raghallaigh and by Barry Reynolds and Hound (2014–2018) by Paul J. Bolger and Barry Devlin.

The dramatic musical program "Celtic Hero" in the Radio Tales series for National Public Radio, was based on the Ulster Cycle story Tochmarc Emire. Deirdre is an opera adaptation of the Ulster Cycle composed 1943-5, by the Canadian composer, Healey Willan, the text by John Coulter. It was the first full-length opera commissioned by the CBC, and was premiered 20 Apr 1946 on radio as Deirdre of the Sorrows, conducted by Ettore Mazzoleni and with Frances James as Deirdre. The myth of Cú Chulainn was adapted by Irish musician Gavin Dunne, better known as "Miracle of Sound," in the song "Tale of Cú Chulainn" on his 2020 album Level 11.
