= Aided Óenfhir Aífe =

Irish legend

Aided Óenfhir Aífe (English: The Death of Aífe's Only Son) is a story from the Ulster Cycle of Irish mythology.

It is a sequel to Tochmarc Emire (English: The Wooing of Emer), in which the Ulaid hero Cú Chulainn, while training in arms overseas, left the warrior princess Aífe pregnant. In Aided Óefhir Aífe their son Connla, at the age of seven, comes to Ireland in search of his father, following instructions that Cú Chulainn had left him not to identify himself.

When he arrives on the Irish coast in a bronze boat with golden oars, Connla's prowess alarms the Ulaid. The persuasive Condere mac Echach fails to convince him to turn away, and the hero Conall Cernach is overcome by him. Finally Cú Chulainn, despite the suspicions of his wife Emer that the boy is his own son, fights him and kills him with the Gáe Bulg, a barbed spear the use of which the warrior woman Scáthach taught only to him. Finally, the grief-stricken Cú Chulainn recognises Connla as his son.

The text is dated to the late ninth or early tenth century, and is found in the Yellow Book of Lecan, a manuscript of the 15th century. It is an Irish instance of an international tale-type represented by the Persian tale of Rostam and Sohrab. W. B. Yeats used it as the basis of his poem "Cúchulain's Fight with the Sea" and his play On Baile's Strand.
