= Tochmarc Emire =

Irish myth

- "The Wooing of Emer"
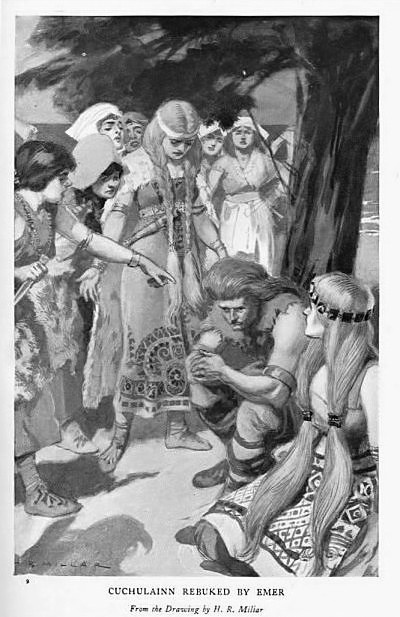
- "Cuchulainn Rebuked by Emer", illustration by H. R. Millar, c. 1905.

Tochmarc Emire ("The Wooing of Emer") is one of the stories in the Ulster Cycle of Irish mythology and one of the longest when it received its form in the second recension (below). It concerns the efforts of the hero Cú Chulainn to marry Emer, who appears as his wife in other stories of the cycle, and his training in arms under the warrior-woman Scáthach. The tochmarc ("wooing" or "courtship") (along with cattle raids, voyages, feasts, births and deaths) is one of the 'genres' of early Irish literature recognised in the manuscript corpus.

== Recensions and manuscript sources ==
The early Irish tale Tochmarc Emire exists in two (main) recensions. The earliest and shortest version is extant only as a copy in a late manuscript, the 15th/16th-century Bodleian Library, MS Rawlinson B 512, where it lacks the first part, beginning instead with the last riddle exchanged between Cú Chulainn and Emer. The text has been dated by Kuno Meyer to the tenth century. An Old Irish original, possibly dating back to the 8th century, but transcribed and slightly modernised in the Middle Irish period appears to lie behind this text.

The longer recension (LU, Stowe D iv 2, Harleian 5280, 23 N 10 and two fragments) was written in the Middle Irish period and represents a greatly expanded version of the earlier version of the narrative.

- Leabhar na hUidre (LU): p 121a-127b (Dublin, RIA). Second part missing.
- Stowe D IV 2: f 74Ra-78Vb (Dublin, RIA). Complete.
- Rawlinson B 512: f 117Ra-118Rb (Oxford, Bodleian Library). First part missing.
- Book of Fermoy 23 E 29: p 207a-212b (Dublin, RIA). Fragment
- Egerton 92: f 24Ra-25Vb (London, British Library). Fragment
- Harley 5280: f 27R-35Rb (London, British Library). Complete.
- 23 N 10 (formerly Betham 145): p 21-24 & 113–124 & 11–12 & 25–26 & 125–128 (Dublin, RIA). Complete.
- Book of Leinster (LL), f 20a46 ff (Trinity College Dublin). Variant of § 30 as found in Echtra Machae.

== Summary ==
In his youth, Cú Chulainn is so beautiful that the Ulstermen become worried that, without a wife of his own, he will steal their wives and ruin their daughters. They search all over Ireland for a suitable wife for him, but he will have none but Emer, daughter of Forgall Monach. However, Forgall is opposed to the match. He suggests that Cú Chulainn should train in arms with the renowned warrior-woman Scáthach in the land of Alba (Scotland), hoping the ordeal will be too much for him and he will be killed. Cú Chulainn takes up the challenge. In the meantime, Forgall offers Emer to Lugaid mac Nóis, a king of Munster, but when he hears that Emer loves Cú Chulainn, Lugaid refuses her hand.

Scáthach teaches Cú Chulainn all the arts of war, including the use of the Gáe Bulg, a terrible barbed spear, thrown with the foot, that has to be cut out of its victim. His fellow trainees include Ferdiad, who becomes Cú Chulainn's best friend and foster-brother. During his time there, Scáthach faces a battle against Aífe, her rival and in some versions her twin sister. Scáthach, knowing Aífe's prowess, fears for Cú Chulainn's life and gives him a powerful sleeping potion to keep him from the battle. However, because of Cú Chulainn's great strength, it only puts him to sleep for an hour, and he soon joins the fray. He fights Aífe in single combat, and the two are evenly matched, but Cú Chulainn distracts her by calling out that Aífe's horses and chariot, the things she values most in the world, have fallen off a cliff, and seizes her. He spares her life on the condition that she call off her enmity with Scáthach, and bear him a son.

Leaving Aífe pregnant, Cú Chulainn returns from Scotland fully trained, but Forgall still refuses to let him marry Emer. Cú Chulainn storms Forgall's fortress, killing twenty-four of Forgall's men, abducts Emer and steals Forgall's treasure. Forgall himself falls from the ramparts to his death. Conchobar has the coll cétingen or "right of the first night" over all marriages of his subjects. He is afraid of Cú Chulainn's reaction if he exercises it in this case, but is equally afraid of losing his authority if he does not. Cathbad suggests a solution: Conchobar sleeps with Emer on the night of the wedding, but Cathbad sleeps between them.

== Related stories ==
In a related story, Aided Óenfir Aífe ("The Death of Aífe's Only Son"), Connla, the son Cú Chulainn fathers with Aífe in Tochmarc Emire, comes to Ireland at the age of seven to seek out his father. His extraordinary skills make him seem a threat, however, and because of a geis placed on him by his father, he refuses to identify himself, and Cú Chulainn kills him in single combat, using the Gáe Bulg.

In another related story, Aided Derbforgaill ("The Death of Derbforgaill"), the Scandinavian princess Derbforgaill, whom Cú Chulainn rescues from being sacrificed to the Fomorians in some versions of Tochmarc Emire, comes to Ireland with her handmaid, in the form of a pair of swans, to seek Cú Chulainn, with whom she has fallen in love. Cú Chulainn and his foster-son Lugaid Riab nDerg see the swans, and Cú Chulainn shoots Derbforgaill down with his sling. The slingstone penetrates her womb, and to save her life Cú Chulainn has to suck it from her side, but since he has tasted her blood he cannot marry her. Instead, he gives her to Lugaid, and they marry and have children. One day in deep winter, the men of Ulster make pillars of snow, and the women compete to see who can urinate the deepest into the pillar and prove herself the most desirable to men. Derbforgaill's urine reaches the ground, and the other women, out of jealousy, attack and mutilate her. Lugaid notices that the snow on the roof of her house has not melted, and realises she is close to death. He and Cú Chulainn rush to the house, but Derbforgaill dies shortly after they arrive, and Lugaid dies of grief. Cú Chulainn avenges them by demolishing the house with the women inside, killing 150 of them.

In Táin Bó Cúailnge ("The Cattle Raid of Cooley"), two of the warriors Cú Chulainn faces in single combat, Fer Báeth and Fer Diad, are his foster-brothers and fellow trainees under Scáthach.

== Adaptations ==
The story was adapted as a dramatic musical programme, "Celtic Hero", for the National Public Radio series Radio Tales.

== Secondary sources ==
- Toner, Gregory (1998). "The Transmission of Tochmarc Emire". Ériu. 49: 71–88.
