= Uathach =

Irish and Scottish mythological figure

In Irish and Scottish mythology, Uathach was Scáthach's daughter and thus the niece of her rival and sister Aífe. Cú Chulainn, who had recently arrived at Scáthach's fortress-home Dún Scáith (Fortress of Shadows) to be her pupil, accidentally broke one of Uathach's fingers, and Uathach's suitor, Cochar Croibhe, challenged him to single combat despite Uathach's protests. Cú Chulainn killed him and became Uathach's lover.
