= Fedelm =

Fedelm (sometimes spelled Feidelm; modern Fidelma) is a female prophet and fili, or learned poet, in the Ulster Cycle of Irish mythology. She appears in the great epic Táin Bó Cuailnge, in which she foretells the armies of Medb and Ailill mac Máta will face against the Ulaid and their greatest champion, Cú Chulainn. A prophetess of the same name appears in another tale, which associates her with Cú Chulainn.

== Táin Bó Cuailnge ==
Fedelm appears in the opening scene of the Táin Bó Cuailnge, preserved in Recension I. Intent on an invasion of Ulster, Queen Medb and Ailill mac Máta, the rulers of Connacht, have mustered a large army from all four provinces of Ireland. Just when they set out, they are met on the road by Fedelm, a young woman of blonde hair and beautiful appearance, who is armed, carries a weaver's beam and rides in a chariot. She identifies herself as a banfhili (female poet) from Connacht and claims to have come from Alba, where she had learnt the art of prophecy to the extent that she could now boast the skill of imbas forosnai, or all-encompassing illuminating knowledge. It has been suggested that Fedelm may have received her training from the warrior woman Scáthach, Cú Chulainn's martial arts teacher in Alba and herself a prophetess. Asked by Medb, who addresses her as prophetess (banfháith), to foretell the future of the army, Fedelm predicts carnage. Medb refuses to accept it, since the Ulstermen had been recently overcome by a mysterious condition which had debilitated them completely. However, Fedelm repeats her prophecy and in a poetic description of the bloody encounters to follow, named Cú Chulainn as their most terrifying opponent.

== Name and other appearances ==
The name "Fedelm" matches the character's role in the Táin Bó Cuailnge, as it appears to mean "prophetess" and to derive from the proto-Celtic stem wēd- / wid- "to know, to see". She has been compared to Veleda, the prophetess described by Tacitus. The name is not uncommon; the Táin and other texts name a daughter of Conchobar mac Nessa Fedelm Noíchrothach. It is probably related to the common male name "Fedlimid".

Though the name is not unique, it is not impossible that the Fedelm of the Táin is the same character as the Fedelm Foltcháin ("of the Lovely Hair") who appears in a brief and difficult Irish text known as Fedelm and Cú Chulainn or Ces Ulad ("The Affliction of the Ulstermen"). The transmitted text, preserved only in the 16th-century (London, British Library, Harley MS 5280), is imperfect and the translations attempted by Vernam Hull and John Carey therefore differ on a number of counts. It tells that one day (before the invasion), Cú Chulainn and his charioteer Láeg come to the River Boyne to learn imbas (as Carey translates) or to obtain "riches" (Hull). The search for imbas would be appropriate as in early Irish narrative, the banks of rivers could serve as liminal places subject to the risk of flooding and in a positive sense, to the attainment of poetic wisdom. The text Immacallam in Dá Thuarad, for instance, states that "the bank of a body of water was a place where knowledge was always revealed for poets".

On the opposite bank stands Fedelm and her husband Elcmaire, who notice the intruders and their chariot laden with items of fidchell and búanbach and with Cú Chulainn's catch of birds. When Cú Chulainn manages to catch a speckled salmon with his spear, Elcmaire goes into the ford and flings a pillar stone towards the chariot, but Cú Chulainn cuts off both his thumbs and both his big toes. Fedelm then utters the prophecy (Hull has "promised") that she would appear naked to the Ulstermen and become Cú Chulainn's lover. This she does after a year and a day. The text ends by suggesting that her appearance to the Ulstermen is what caused their aforesaid debility. This explanation of the Debility of the Ulstermen differs considerably from that given by Noinden Ulad and related texts.

Fedelm's name and a connection with the Boyne also occur in the second, Middle Irish recension of the Tochmarc Emire. When Cú Chulainn travels southwards to woo Emer, he comes across the so-called "Marrow (Smir) of the woman Fedelm", explained as another name for the River Boyne. The origin of the name is not explained, however, and the accompanying mythological story focuses on the drowning of Boann instead.

== Sources ==
=== Primary sources ===
- Táin Bó Cuailnge (Recension I), ed. Cecile O'Rahilly, Táin Bó Cúailnge Recension I. Dublin: Dublin Institute for Advanced Studies Dublin, 1976.
- Cú Chulainn and Fedelm (also Ces Ulad), ed. Kuno Meyer, "Mitteilungen aus irischen Handschriften (Fortsetzung)." ZCP 8 (1912): p. 120; tr. Vernam Hull, "Ces Ulad." ZCP 29 (1962–64); tr. John Carey, The Celtic Heroic Age, ed. J.T. Koch and J. Carey. 3d ed. Andover et al., 2000. pp. 67–8.
- Tochmarc Emire (Recension II), ed. A.G. van Hamel (1933). Compert Con Culainn and Other Stories. Mediaeval and Modern Irish Series 3. Dublin: DIAS.; tr. Kuno Meyer (1888). "The Wooing of Emer". Archaeological Review. 1: 68–75, 150–5, 231–5, 298–307.

=== Secondary sources ===
- Bernhardt-House, Phillip A. (2009). "Warriors, Words, and Wood: Oral and Literary Wisdom in the Exploits of Irish Mythological Warriors". Studia Celtica Fennica. 6: 5–19.
- Koch, John T. (2006). "Fedelm". In Koch, John T. (ed.). Celtic Culture: A Historical Encyclopedia. Santa Barbara, Denver, and Oxford: ABC-CLIO. pp. 736–7.
- Koch, John T. (2006). "Imbas forosnai". In Koch, John T. (ed.). Celtic Culture: A Historical Encyclopedia. Santa Barbara, Denver, and Oxford: ABC-CLIO. p. 958.
