= Culann =

Figure in Irish mythology

In the Ulster Cycle of Irish mythology, Culann was a smith whose house was protected by a ferocious watchdog. Culann's hound was a pup of Celtchar's hound Dael, and he was found in the skull of Conganchnes mac Dedad along with two other pups (Celtchar and Mac da Tho's hounds); Culann's hound was speckled, while Celtchar and Mac da Tho's hounds were black and grey, respectively.

Culann invited Conchobar mac Nessa, king of Ulster, and his retinue to a feast at his house. On the way Conchobar saw his young nephew Sétanta playing hurling, and was so impressed he invited the boy to join him at the feast. Sétanta told him he would catch up once the game was over.

The feast got underway, and Culann asked Conchobar if he was expecting anyone else. Conchobar, who had forgotten about Sétanta, answered no, and Culann unleashed his watchdog. When Sétanta arrived he was forced to kill the dog in self-defence, and out of obligation offered to take its place until a replacement could be reared. For this he was renamed Cú Chulainn – "Culann's hound".

== Legacy ==
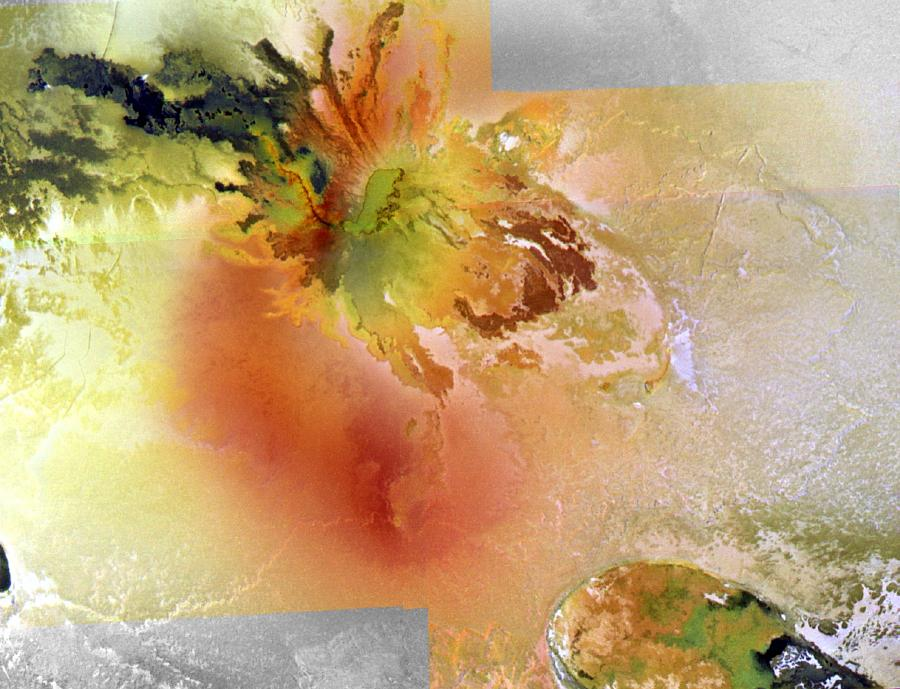
The Culann Patera on Jupiter's moon Io

In 1979, NASA named the Culann Patera on the Gallilean moon of Io after the legendary smith from Irish mythology.
