= Lúin of Celtchar =

Mythological weapon

In the Ulster Cycle of early Irish literature, the Lúin of Celtchar (Irish: Lúin Celtchair) is the name of a long, fiery lance or spear belonging to Celtchar mac Uthechar and wielded by other heroes, such as Dubthach, Mac Cécht and Fedlimid.

== Properties ==
Detailed descriptions of the spear's special use and terrible effect are to be found in the Middle Irish texts Togail Bruidne Dá Derga ("The Destruction of the Hostel of Da Derga") (Recension II) and Mesca Ulad ("The Intoxication of the Ulstermen"), both of which employ the so-called "watchman device" to describe the fearful appearance of the warrior Dubthach Dóeltenga. In Togail Bruidne Dá Derga, it appears when the spies of Ingcél Cáech report on Conaire's large retinue of warriors in the hostel of Da Derga in Leinster. Lomnae Drúth observes:

The man in the centre had a great lance, with fifty rivets through it, and its shaft would be a load for a team of oxen. He brandished the lance until sparks as big as eggs all but flew from it, and then he struck the butt against his palm three times. Before them was a great food cauldron, large enough for a bullock, with an appalling dark liquid in it, and the man dipped the lance into the liquid. If not the lance was not quenched quickly, it blazed up over its shaft – you would have thought there was a roaring fire in the upper part of the house.

The interpreter Fer Rogain identifies the figure as Dubthach Dóeltenga and explains:

And the lance that was in the hand of Dubthach, that was the Lúin of Celtchair son of Uthechar that was found at the Battle of Mag Tuired. Whenever the blood of enemies is about to flow from the lance, a cauldron full of venom is required to quench it; otherwise, the lance will blaze up in the fist of the man carrying it, and it will pierce him or the lord of the royal house. Each thrust of this lance will kill a man, even if it does not reach him; if the lance is cast, it will kill nine men, and there will be a king or royal heir or plundering chieftain in their number. I swear by what my people swear by, the Lúin of Celtchar will serve drinks of death to a multitude tonight.

In Mesca Ulad, Medb's watchmen paint a very similar picture when they describe one of the approaching warriors:

A great warrior, his spear reaches to the height of his shoulder. When its spear-heat seizes it, he strikes the butt of the great spear across the palm, so that the fill of a sack-measure of fiery tinder-sparks bursts out over its blade and over its tip, when its spear-heat takes hold of it. Before him there is a cauldron of black blood, of dreadful liquid, prepared by night by his sorcery from the blood of dogs and cats and druids, in order that the head of that spear might be dipped in that poisonous liquid when its spear-heat comes to it.

Cú Roí then explains to Medb and her company that the watchmen have just seen Dubthach, who has borrowed the Lúin of Celtchar, and that a cauldron of red blood stands before him "so that it would not burn its shaft or the man who carried it were it not bathed in the cauldron of poisonous blood; and it is foretelling battle that it is." This latter quality has been taken to mean that such "sensitive spears ... by their vibration, portended the imminence of battle and slaughter."

A late version of the saga Cath Ruis na Ríg ("The Battle of Ross na Ríg") gives a more succinct account of the Luin, but also adds a number of details, such as the use of four mercenaries to keep the cauldron in place. Obviously, the weapon needed to be handled with extreme care. According to his death-tale, Celtchar was accidentally killed by his own spear in a way which emphasises its excessive heat. When he had used the Lúin to slay a hound which had been ravaging the country, he placed it upright with the spear-point upwards and so a drop of the hound's blood which trickled down along the spear went through him and killed him.

== Circulation ==
In the Ulster cycle, Celtchar's Lúin is used by various warriors of Ulster and Connacht. Dubthach had use of it (Togain Bruidne Da Derga and Mesca Ulad, see above quotes), and Dubhthach himself was slain by Fedlimid who wielded Lúin Celtchar according to a notice following the Togail Bruidne Dá Choca(e)

According to a poem by Cináed ua hArtacáin (d. 975), the Connacht champion Mac Cécht used it to slay Cúscraid Menn, son of Conchobor mac Nessa.

There is also a tract in TCD MS 1336 (olim MS H 3.17), col. 723 which claims that the spear survived into the reign of Cormac mac Airt, and came to be known as the Crimall of Birnbuadach causing Cormac's blinding and rendering him unfit for kingship. Moreover, it alleges this was the "Famous yew of the wood", the name by which the spear of Lug mac Eithliu of the Tuatha Dé Danann was called. This tract occurs as a postscript to a later version (B group) of The Expulsion of the Déisi found in the same MS, but is known only by the brief English recap provided by Hennessy.

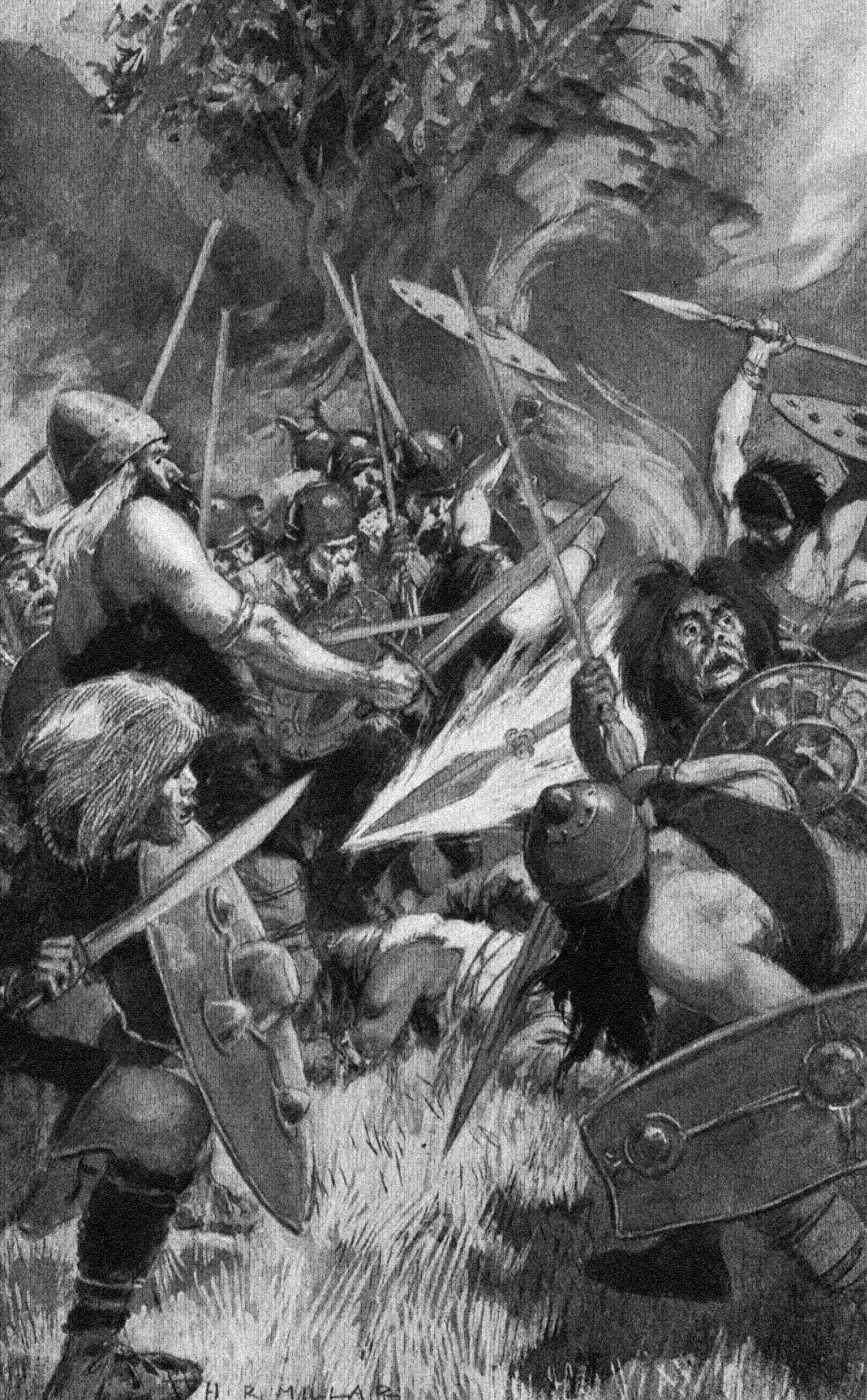
H.R. Millar's illustration of "Lugh's Magic Spear", 1905.

=== Spear of Lug? ===
Arthur C. L. Brown and R. S. Loomis, proponents of the Irish origin of the Grail romances, argued that Celtchar's Lúin was to be identified with the spear of Lug, a weapon which is named in Middle Irish narratives as one of the four items which the Túatha Dé Danann introduced to Ireland. A connection may have been drawn implicitly by Togail Bruidne Dá Derga, which claims that the Lúin was found in the Battle of Mag Tuired, elsewhere known as the battle in which the Túatha Dé Danann led by Lug defeated the Fomoiri. Moreover, a tale of later date, the Early Modern Irish Oidheadh Chloinne Tuireann describes the spear of Lug in ways which are reminiscent of Celtchair's Lúin. However, the Middle Irish references to Lug's spear do not correspond closely to the Lúin.

== See also ==
- Gáe Bulg
- Lance of Longinus

== Sources ==
=== Texts ===
- Cináed Ua Hartacáin, "Fianna bátar i nEmain", ed. Whitley Stokes, "On the deaths of some Irish heroes." Revue Celtique 23 (1902): 303–48.
- Togail Bruidne Dá Derga, ed. Eleanor Knott, Togail Bruidne Da Derga. Dublin, 1936; tr. Jeffrey Gantz, Early Irish Myths and Sagas. Harmondsworth: Penguin, 1986.
- Mesca Ulad, ed. J. Carmichael Watson, Mesca Ulad. Mediaeval and Modern Irish Series 13. Dublin, 1941; tr. John T. Koch, in The Celtic Heroic Age, ed. John T. Koch and John Carey. 3d ed. Andover, 2000. 106–27; ed. and tr. W.R. Hennessy. Mesca Ulad: or, the Intoxication of the Ultonians. Todd Lecture Series 1. Dublin, 1889.
- Aided Cheltchair mac Uthechair, ed. and tr. Kuno Meyer, The Death Tales of the Ulster Heroes. Todd Lecture Series. Dublin, 1906. 24–31. Translation online.
- "The Expulsion of the Déisi" (TCD MS 1336). The relevant portion has remained unedited and was not reproduced in the edition by Vernam Hull (ed. and tr.), "The later version of the Expulsion of the Déssi." ZCP 27 (1957–59): pp. 14–63.
- Cath Ruis na Ríg (Stowe MS E IV 3), ed. and tr. Edmund Hogan, Cath Ruis na Ríg for Bóinn. Todd Lecture Series 4. Dublin, 1892.

=== References ===
- Carey, John. Ireland and the Grail. Aberystwyth, 2007.
- Brown, Arthur Charles Lewis. "The Bleeding Lance." PMLA 25 (1910): 1–59.
- Loomis, Roger Sherman. Arthurian tradition and Chrétien de Troyes. New York, 1949.
- O'Curry, Eugene. On the manners and customs of the ancient Irish. Vol. 3, Lectures vol. 2. London: Williams and Norgate, 1873. pp. 324–7.
- Fire Emblem Three Houses
