= Labraid Luathlám ar Claideb =

Ruler of Mag Mell in Irish mythology

Labraid Luathlám ar Claideb ('Labraid swift sword-hand') is a figure in Irish mythology, appearing in the medieval Ulster Cycle story Serglige Con Culainn. Here, he is the ruler of Mag Mell. He is husband to Lí Ban, who woos Cú Chulainn for Lí Ban's sister Fand. According to his wife, Labraid was the best of all the warriors in the world.

== Labraid's Home ==
The following poem is recited by Lí Ban in reference to Labraid's home in Mag Mell:

Labra's home's a pure lake, whither
Troops of women come and go;
Easy paths shall lead thee thither,
Where thou shalt swift Labra know.

Hundreds his skilled arm repelleth;
Wise be they his deeds who speak:
Look where rosy beauty dwelleth;
Like to that think Labra's cheek.

Head of wolf, for gore that thirsteth,
Near his thin red falchion shakes;
Shields that cloak the chiefs he bursteth,
Arms of foolish foes he breaks.

Trust of friend he aye requiteth,
Scarred his skin, like bloodshot eye;
First of fairy men he fighteth;
Thousands, by him smitten, die.

Chiefs at Echaid Juil's name tremble;
Yet his land-strange tale-he sought,
He whose locks gold threads resemble,
With whose breath wine-scents are brought.

More than all strife-seekers noted,
Fiercely to far lands he rides;
Steeds have trampled, skiffs have floated
Near the isle where he abides.

Labra, swift Sword-Wielder, gaineth
Fame for actions over sea;
Sleep for all his watch sustaineth!
Sure no coward hound is he.

The chains on the necks of the coursers he rides,
And their bridles are ruddy with gold:
He hath columns of crystal and silver besides,
The roof of his house to uphold.
