= Lí Ban =

Irish female mythological figure

Lí Ban (from Old Irish lí 'beauty' and ban 'of women'; thus 'paragon of women') may refer to an otherworldly female figure in Irish mythology.

This Lí Ban claimed the beautiful Fand as sister, and was wife to Labraid Luathlám ar Claideb ("Labraid of the swift sword-hand"), the ruler of Magh Mell.

She appears primarily in the Irish tale of Serglige Con Culainn (The Wasting Sickness of Cú Chulainn), where she is the daughter of Áed Abrat. She appears first in the form of a sea bird, then as an otherworldly woman who inflicts the story's eponymous sickness on Cú Chulainn. In the story, Lí Ban acts as messenger and mediator; she and Cú Chulainn's charioteer Láeg work together to see that Cú Chulainn is healed in exchange for his aid in Fand's battle in the Otherworld.

From this, Lí Ban may have derived her namesake, a legendary Lí Ban of Lough Neagh.
