= Labraid =

Labraid is an Irish male name, it may refer to:

- Labraid Loingsech, a.k.a. Labraid Lorc, a High King of Ireland.
- Labraid Luathlám ar Claideb, a figure in Irish mythology
- Labraid Lámderg ("Red hand Labraid"), possible origin of the term Red Hand of Ulster
