= Geas =

Mythological taboo or vow

A geis or geas (pl. geasa) is an idiosyncratic taboo, whether of obligation or prohibition, similar to being under a vow or curse, yet the observance of which can also bring power and blessings. The word "geas" is also used to mean specifically a spell prohibiting some action. Geasa occur commonly in Irish and Scottish folklore and mythology, as well as in modern English-language fantasy-fiction.

The word originates in Old Irish, also known as Old Gaelic, and retains the same form in Modern Irish (nominative singular geis /ɟɛʃ/, nominative plural geasa /ˈɟasˠə/; genitive sg. geise /ˈɟɛʃə/, genitive plural geas /ɟasˠ/). In modern Scottish Gaelic, the spelling has evolved in a slightly different direction (nominative singular geas /kʲes/, nominative plural geasan, genitive singular geis or geasa). It has also been borrowed into English in both forms (singular geas or geis /ɡɛʃ/ or /ˈɡi.əʃ/, plural geasa)).

== In Irish mythology ==
A geas can be compared with a curse or, paradoxically, a gift. If someone under a geas violates the associated taboo, the infractor will suffer dishonor or even death. Conversely, the observing of one's geas is believed to bring power.

The geas is often a key device in hero tales, such as that of Cú Chulainn in Irish mythology. Traditionally, the doom of heroes comes about due to their violation of their geas either by accident or by having multiple geasa, which then come into conflict. For instance, Cú Chulainn has a geas to never eat dog meat, and he is also bound by a geas to eat any food offered to him by a woman. When a hag offers him dog meat, he has no way to emerge from the situation unscathed; this leads to his death.

In some cases, the placing of a geas can lead to tragedy even when it is not violated. Aoife imposed three geasa on Connla, her son with Cú Chulainn: he cannot turn back once he starts his journey; he must not refuse a challenge; and he must never tell anyone his name. She then sent Connla, aged seven, to seek out his father, but he was a child of such extraordinary skill that he was seen as a threat after having defeated all Ulster heroes who met him. Because of the geas placed on him by his mother, he refuses to identify himself, which leads to his own father, Cú Chulainn, killing him in single combat using the Gáe Bulg before recognising too late who he is. He then introduces his dying son to the men of Ulster as a fitting hero.

A geas might appear beneficial by involving a prophecy that a person would die in a particular way so bizarre that they could then avoid their fate for many years. As with Conaire Mór, though, in the tale of Togail Bruidne Dá Derga, who strictly observed a number of geasa, a small unconnected infraction can escalate to one's undoing. By initially making exceptions to crimes of stealing by his foster-brothers contravening fír flathemon, the king's upholding of true judgement, things proceed until they deliberately contravene a geis of Conaire's against marauding in his reign. Though he tries to rectify the situation by exiling them, his fate intervenes, so the remaining geasa are involuntarily and accidentally broken one after the other with a sense of gathering doom that cannot be checked.

In the Irish saga of Conchobar mac Nessa, the king is said to have the right to the first night with any marriageable woman and the right to sleep with the wife of anyone who hosted him. This is called the Geis of the king. Whether this right actually existed and was exercised by the Celts is not attested outside the sagas. It is similar to the droit du seigneur of feudal Europe.

== Welsh mythology ==
Considerable similarity exists between the Goidelic geasa and the Brythonic tynged. This is not surprising given the close origins of many of the variants of Celtic mythology.

For example, the Welsh hero Lleu Llaw Gyffes (in one version of his story) was destined to die neither "during the day or night, nor indoors or outdoors, neither riding nor walking, not clothed and not naked, nor by any weapon lawfully made." He was safe until his wife, Blodeuwedd, learning of these foretold conditions, convinced him to show her how he could theoretically be stepping out of a river onto a riverbank sheltered by a roof and put one foot on a goat, and so on, thus enabling the conditions that allowed him to be wounded.

== In popular culture ==
Geas, geis and derivative words and concepts have appeared in a variety of forms in popular culture.

In Terry Pratchett's Discworld book series, there is a running homophonic gag centered on various characters having a broad misunderstanding of the words geis and geese.

In Pirates of the Caribbean: At World's End, Governor Weatherby Swann was going to stab the heart of Davy Jones, only for Jones to reveal that he cast a terrible geis upon his heart when he carved it from his body, that if someone stabs the heart then theirs will take its place. The line was cut from the film, but the geis remains in place as the curse of the Flying Dutchman. With the help of Jack Sparrow, Will Turner stabs the heart and becomes the new captain of the Dutchman.

Geasa are widely used in Charles Stross's Laundry Files series, especially employed by The Laundry (Britain's secret government agency tasked with protecting the realm from supernatural threats) to enforce the loyalty and duty of its agents.

Geas (spelled Geass in the series) is an ability that plays a prominent role in the Anime Code Geass: Lelouch of the Rebellion, conceptually inspired by traditional Gaelic Geas. In the Series, Geass manifests as a unique ability granted to characters by otherworldly beings, often described as witch-like. Many of these Geass function as a sort of binding vow that grants a character the ability to compel or enforce specific behaviors onto others, in parallel to the folkloric Geas, which traditionally imposes obligations or prohibitions on an individual.

=== Parallels in English literature ===
Prohibitions and taboos similar to geasa are also found in more recent English literature, though they are not described as geasa in those texts. For example, in William Shakespeare's play Macbeth, the title character believes he is safe because "no man of woman born shall harm Macbeth". However, his nemesis Macduff was "from his mother's womb untimely ripp'd" (i.e., born by Caesarean section), and was therefore not "of woman born".

Another example is the Witch-King of Angmar from Tolkien's legendarium, who has a geas-like prophecy described by the Elven hero, Glorfindel: "Far off yet is his doom, and not by the hand of man shall he fall." The meaning is then quite literal, for the Witch-king eventually falls at the hands of Éowyn and Meriadoc, one a shieldmaiden of Rohan, and thus not a man but a woman, and the other a hobbit, and thus not a Man as in species.
