= Blaí Briugu =

Warrior in Irish mythology

Blaí Briugu (Blaí the Landholder or Hospitaller) is an Ulster warrior in the Ulster Cycle of Irish Mythology. He was wealthy and kept a hostel, and had a geis which required him to sleep with any woman who stayed there unaccompanied. When Brig Bretach, wife of Celtchar, stayed there on her own, he slept with her (as required by his geis) and for that Celtchar killed him.
