= Emer =

Wife of Cú Chulainn in Irish mythology

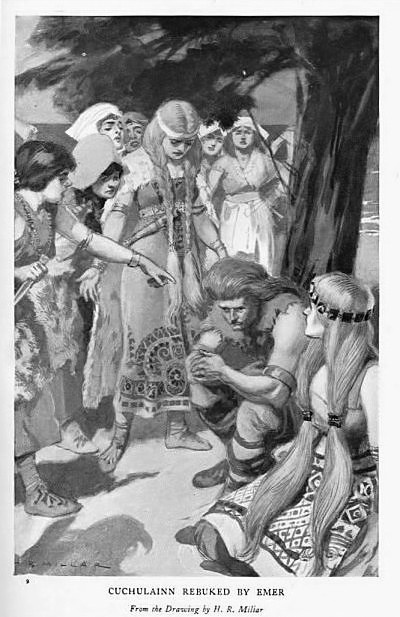
Emer rebuking Cú Chulainn. (1905 illustration by H. R. Millar.)

Emer (Old Irish: [ˈẽβ̃ʲəɾ]), in modern Irish Eimhear or Éimhear (with variations including Eimer, Eimear and Éimear) and in Scottish Gaelic Eimhir, is the name of the daughter of Forgall Monach and the wife of the hero Cú Chulainn in the Ulster Cycle of Irish mythology.

== Legend ==
=== Tochmarc Emire "The Wooing of Emer" ===
The Ulstermen searched all over Ireland for a suitable wife for Cú Chulainn, but he would have none but Emer. He visited her at Forgall's house at Lusk, County Dublin, and wooed her by trading cryptic riddles with her. Emer would accept Cú Chulainn as a husband, but only when his deeds justified it.

However, Forgall was opposed to the match. He came to Ulster in disguise and suggested that Cú Chulainn should train in arms with the renowned warrior-woman Scáthach in Scotland, hoping the ordeal would be too much for him and he would be killed. Cú Chulainn took up the challenge. He learned all the arts of war from Scáthach, and while he was there slept with her rival Aoife, or Aífe, leaving her pregnant.

In the meantime, Forgall offered Emer to Lugaid mac Noís, a king of Munster. However, when he heard that Emer loved Cú Chulainn, Lugaid refused her hand.

Cú Chulainn returned from Scotland fully trained, but Forgall still refused to let him marry Emer. Cú Chulainn stormed Forgall's fortress, killing twenty-four of Forgall's men, abducted Emer and stole Forgall's treasure. Forgall himself fell from the ramparts to his death. An ally of Forgall's, Scenn Menn, tried to stop the fleeing couple, but Cú Chulainn killed him in single combat at a ford. Having proved his prowess, Emer now agreed to marry him.

Conchobar mac Nessa, the king of Ulster, had the "right of the first night" over all marriages of his subjects. He was afraid of Cú Chulainn's reaction if he exercised it in this case, but would lose his authority if he didn't. A solution was found - Conchobar would sleep with Emer on the night of the wedding, but Cathbad the druid would sleep between them.

=== Emer's only jealousy ===
Though Cú Chulainn had many lovers, Emer's only jealousy came when he was entranced into love with Fand, wife of Manannán mac Lir, the king of the great sea, as recounted in the narrative Serglige Con Culainn ("The Wasting Sickness of Cú Chulainn"). She decided to kill her rival, but when she saw the strength of Fand's love for Cú Chulainn she decided to give him up to her. Fand, touched by Emer's magnanimity, decided to return to her own husband. Manannán shook his cloak between Cú Chulainn and Fand, ensuring the two would never meet again, and Cú Chulainn and Emer drank a potion to wipe the whole affair from their memories.

=== Other stories ===
When Aífe's son Connla came to Ireland in search of his father Cú Chulainn, he was challenged by three champions from Ulster. Connla overcame the first two, and Cú Chulainn was the third. When he was summoned, Emer informed him that Connla was his only son, but he refused to listen to her. Only once Cú Chulainn had killed Connla with his spear did he realize that Emer was telling the truth.

Emer was said to possess the six gifts of womanhood: beauty, voice, sweet speech, wisdom, skill at needlework, and chastity.

== Cultural references ==
=== Literature ===
Emer is the subject of William Butler Yeats' play The Only Jealousy of Emer. This play is one of his five famous Cú Chulainn pieces, and is written with heavy stylistic influences from the Japanese Noh theatre. The story is taken, with some alterations, from Lady Gregory's saga-story of the same name in her collection Cuchulain of Muirthemne (1902). Jealousy premiered in Amsterdam in 1922, under the direction of Albert van Dalsum with masks created by the sculptor Hildo Krop. It did not play on the Irish stage until May 1926, when it was staged by the Dublin Drama League at the Abbey Theatre.

Emer is mentioned in Yeats' poem "The Secret Rose": "and him Who met Fand walking among flaming dew By a grey shore where the wind never blew, And lost the world and Emer for a kiss;"

Emer is described in Angela's Ashes by Frank McCourt as "The Greatest Pisser" in reference to the manner in which she won Cuchulain's hand in marriage. She is also referenced as part of the Táin-based imagery in Máirtín Ó Cadhain's The Withering Branch.

In November 1943, Scottish Gaelic poet Sorley MacLean published his first individual collection of poems, Dàin do Eimhir agus Dàin Eile (Poems to Eimhir and Other Poems). The Dàin do Eimhir sequence was one of the most important works published in Gaelic in the 20th century.

Emer is the protagonist of David Duchovny's 2018 novel Miss Subways which draws inspiration from the myth.

=== Other references ===
The LÉ Emer (P21), a former ship in the Irish Naval Service, was named after her.
