= Ferdiad =

Character in the Ulster Cycle of Irish mythology

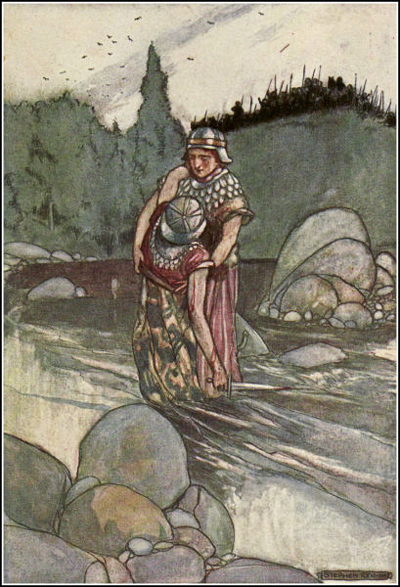
"Ferdia Falls by the Hand of Cuchulain", illustration by Stephen Reid from Eleanor Hull's The Boys' Cuchulain, 1904

Ferdiad (pronounced [ˈfʲerd̠ʲiːa̯ð]; also Fer Diad, Ferdia, Fear Diadh), son of Damán, son of Dáire, of the Fir Domnann, is a warrior of Connacht in the Ulster Cycle of Irish mythology. In the Táin Bó Cúailnge, Ferdiad finds himself on the side of the war opposite to that taken by his best friend and foster-brother Cú Chulainn, with whom he had trained in arms under the renowned warrior woman Scáthach. He and Cú Chulainn are equal in all martial feats, with two exceptions: the Gáe Bulg, a barbed spear which Scáthach has taught only Cú Chulainn to use; and Ferdiad's horn skin, which no weapon can pierce.

When Ailill and Medb, king and queen of Connacht, invade Ulster to steal the bull Donn Cúailnge, their progress is held up by Cú Chulainn, who demands single combat. After Cú Chulainn has defeated a series of Connacht champions, Medb sends for Ferdiad, but he only agrees to fight Cú Chulainn after Findabair, Ailill and Medb's daughter, has seductively plied him with alcohol, and Medb has variously bribed, shamed and goaded him to do so. They fight in the ford for three days, first fighting with eight swords, darts, and spears, then fighting with "throwing-spears" and lances, and finally moving on to "heavy, hard-smiting swords." It is on the third day that Ferdiad starts to gain the upper hand. At this point, Cú Chulainn calls to his charioteer, Laeg, for the Gáe Bolga, which he floats down the river to him. Cú Chulainn throws a light spear at Ferdiad's chest, causing him to raise his shield, and then picks up the Gáe Bolga between his toes and thrusts it through Ferdiad's anus, upon which the barbs spread throughout his body, killing him. The Gáe Bolga is then removed from Ferdiad's body by Laeg, and Cú Chulainn mourns Ferdiad's death, praising his strength and bravery:

Ah, Ferdiad, betrayed to death.
Our last meeting, oh, how sad!
Thou to die I to remain.
Ever sad our long farewell!

Scholars believe that the fight between Cú Chulainn and Ferdiad is a late addition to the Táin, originating not earlier than the eleventh century and drawing on earlier episodes in the story.

Ferdiad's name has been interpreted as meaning "man of smoke", "man of the pair" or "man of two feet", and may be a back-formation from the placename Áth Fhir Diad (Ardee, County Louth) which is supposedly named after him.

Some modern scholars see his relationship with Cú Chulainn, and his death, as having homoerotic undertones.

== Legacy ==
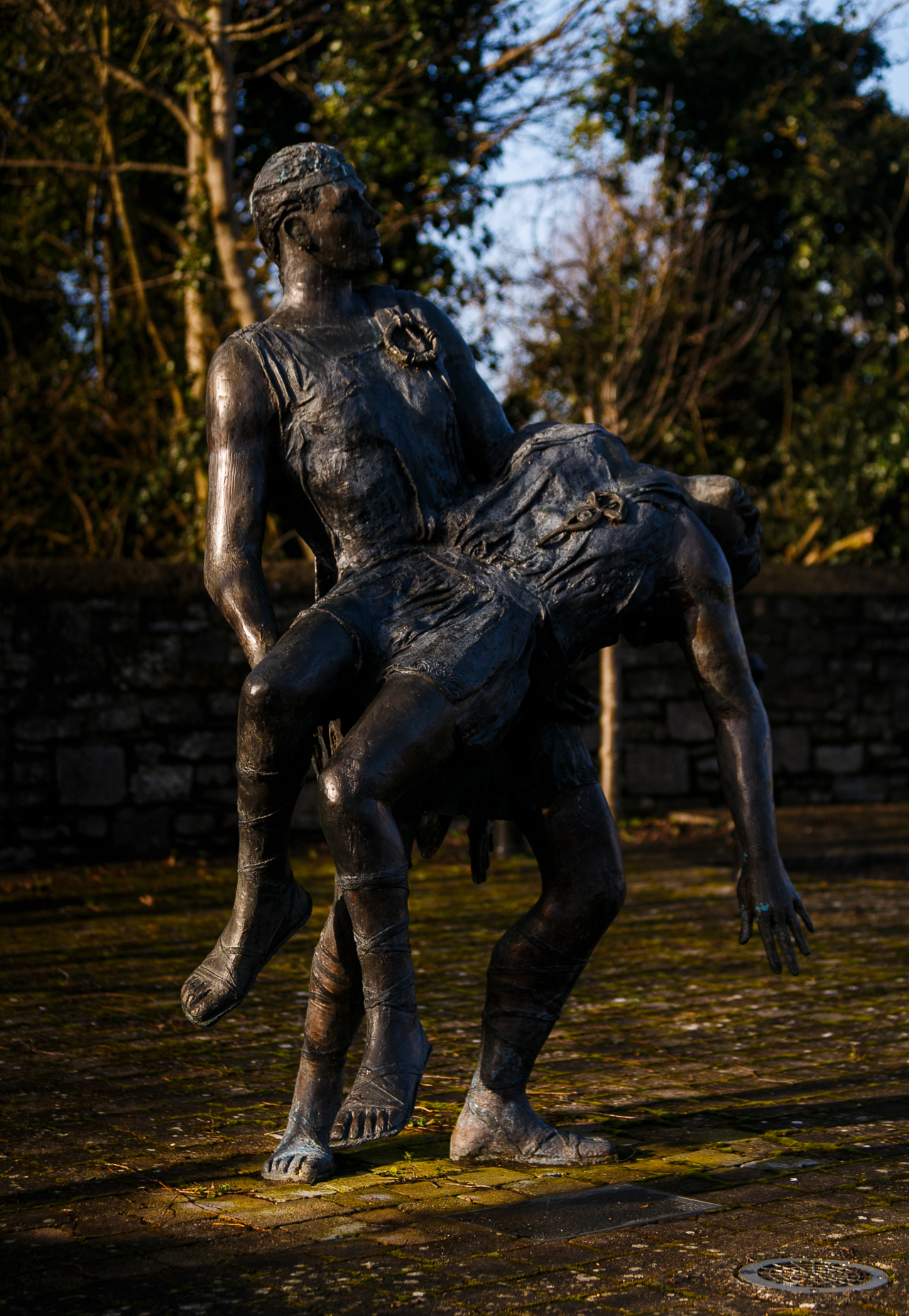
A Statue of Cuchulainn and Ferdia in Ardee, Co. Louth, Ireland.

The ford on which he died is named Áth Fhirdiad (Ferdiad's ford in Irish) Ardee, County Louth is named after him (Baile Átha Fhirdhia).

A bronze statue stands in Bridge Street, Ardee depicting the battle and the death of Ferdiad.

== See also ==
- Impalement
- Dragon of Wantley
