= Serglige Con Culainn =

Irish legend

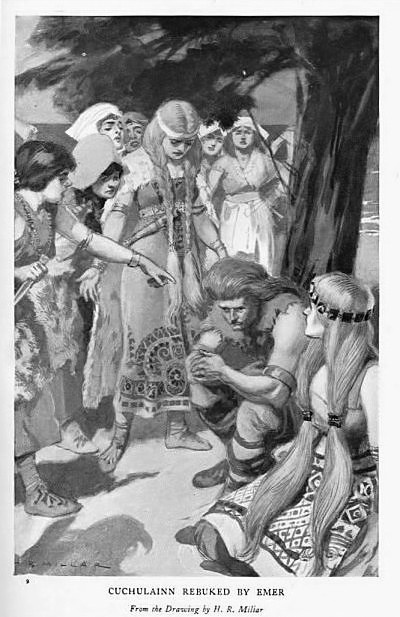
Cúchulainn rebuked by Emer (1905 illustration by H. R. Millar)

Serglige Con Culainn (The Sick-Bed of Cú Chulainn or The Wasting Sickness of Cúchulainn), also known as Oenét Emire (The Only Jealousy of Emer) is a narrative from the Ulster Cycle of Irish mythology. It tells of a curse that fell upon the warrior Cú Chulainn as a result of his attacking otherworldly women, and his eventual recovery by reluctantly agreeing to give military aid to those he had wronged. His developing relationship with one of the otherworldly women, Fand, occasions his wife Emer's "only jealousy."

== Literary and historical value ==
In the assessment of Myles Dillon,

The story of Cú Chulainn's visit to the Other World has a special claim on our attention, because of its long descriptions of the Irish Elysium, here called Mag Mell 'the Plain of Delights', and also for the quality of the poetry which makes up almost half of the text. In some of the poems one recognizes the tension and grace which were later so finely cultivated in the bardic schools, and the moods of sorrow and joy are shared by the reader; the content is not sacrificed for the form ... The scene between Cú Chulainn and his wife after he has given the magic birds to the other women (§6) and the humorous account of Lóeg's conversation with Lí Ban (§14) are instances of the sudden intimacy in these Irish stories...

== Origins and manuscripts ==
The story survives in two manuscripts, the twelfth-century Book of the Dun Cow and a seventeenth-century copy of this manuscript, Trinity College, Dublin, H. 4. 22.

It is clear, however, that the Book of the Dun Cow combined two different versions of the text: parts are in the hand of the main scribe of the manuscript (referred to by Dillon as Recension A), but parts have been erased and rewritten, or leaves removed and replaced, by a scribe with a different hand, apparently copying from a now lost manuscript known as the Yellow Book of Slane (referred to by Dillon as Recension B). This scribe may have made further additions of his own. Precisely how much of our surviving text belongs to each source has been the subject of debate. The material judged to derive from Recension B exhibits linguistic features pointing, amongst later ones, to the ninth century, while the language of A seems to be eleventh-century. A has long been considered the more conservative version of the story nevertheless, but John Carey has argued that B is the earlier version.

The combination of material leads to some inconsistencies and incoherence in the story, prominently an apparent shift from calling Cú Chulainn's wife Ethne Ingubai to calling her Emer.

== Plot summary ==
The Ulster hero Cú Chulainn is with other men in Muirtheimne, hunting birds by the water. A number of the men kill two birds for their wives, so the women may wear feathers on each shoulder of their gowns. When all the women but Emer have birds, Cú Chulainn becomes determined to kill the largest, most beautiful birds for her. The only birds still in the sky are indeed the largest and most exotic-looking, but the two seabirds are linked by a golden chain and sing a magical sleeping song. Emer recognizes that this means they are from the Otherworld and tells Cú Chulainn not to kill them. He attempts to do so anyway, but only manages to strike one of the birds on the feathers of her wing, damaging her wing, but not inflicting a mortal wound. Cú Chulainn falls ill, and lies unconscious and feverish next to a standing stone.

In his fevered state he sees two women approaching. They are Fand and Lí Ban, whom he assaulted while they were in bird form. They have horsewhips and beat him almost to death. He lies ill in bed for nearly a year, until Lí Ban returns, asking him to come to Mag Mell and help Fand defeat her enemies in a battle there. In exchange for his military aid, Fand will agree to heal him of his illness. Cú Chulainn refuses, but his charioteer, Láeg, agrees to go. At this point, the story is interrupted by Cú Chulainn suddenly giving a long series of advice to his foster-son Lugaid Réoderg, the newly chosen king of Tara. This material is part of the genre of tecosca ('precepts, instructions') and, in Dillon's estimation, 'can hardly belong to the story in its original form'. However, Cú Chulainn's uncharacteristic wisdom here can be understood as a beneficial side-effect of his magically inflicted illness.

On his return, Láeg, with the help of Emer (who berates her husband for choosing his pride over his health) manages to convince Cú Chulainn to accompany him to Fand's lands.

In Mag Mell he joins the battle, and helps defeat Fand and Lí Ban's enemies. Fand agrees to sleep with him, but this is discovered by Emer, who confronts Fand, accompanied by a troop of women armed with knives. After much discussion both women recognize the other's unselfish love, and request that Cú Chulainn take the other. Fand decides that since she already has a husband, Manannán mac Lir, Emer should stay with Cú Chulainn so she will not be left alone. Cú Chulainn and Fand are both heartbroken, however. Fand asks Manannán to shake his cloak of mist between her and Cú Chulainn, ensuring that they will never meet again. The druids give Cúchulainn and Emer a potion of forgetfulness, and they forget the entire affair.

The text closes with a statement generally attributed to the scribe who altered the manuscript text (and which is sometimes omitted from modern translations), that 'that is the disastrous vision shown to Cú Chulainn by the fairies. For the diabolical power was great before the faith, and it was so great that devils used to fight with men in bodily form, and used to show delights and mysteries to them, as though they really existed. So they were believed to be; and ignorant men used to call those visions síde and áes síde'.

== Cultural references ==
Augusta, Lady Gregory included a Victorian version of the story in her 1902 collection Cuchulain of Muirthemne. Gregory's version was loosely adapted by William Butler Yeats for his 1922 play The Only Jealousy of Emer. The Pogues titled the opening track of their 1985 album Rum, Sodomy, and the Lash "The Sick Bed of Cuchulainn" after the tale.

== Bibliography ==
=== Manuscripts ===
- Lebor na hUidre (LU) fol. 43a-50b (+H) (RIA)
- H 4.22, fol. X, p. 89-104 (TCD)

=== Editions ===
- Dillon, Myles (ed.). "The Trinity College text of Serglige Con Culainn." Scottish Gaelic Studies 6 (1949): 139-175; 7 (1953): 88 (=corrigenda). Based on H 4.22, with readings from Lebor na hUidre.
- Dillon, Myles (ed.). Serglige Con Culainn. Mediaeval and Modern Irish Series 14. Dublin: Dublin Institute for Advanced Studies, 1953. Based on LU. Available from CELT
- Smith, Roland Mitchell (ed. and tr.). "On the Bríatharthecosc Conculain." Zeitschrift für celtische Philologie 15 (1924): 187-98. Based on part of the text, Cúchulainn's instruction.
- Windisch, Ernst (ed.). Irische Texte mit Wörterbuch. Leipzig, 1880. 197-234. Based on LU, with variants from H 4.22.

=== Translations ===
- Dillon, Myles (tr.). "The Wasting Sickness of Cú Chulainn." Scottish Gaelic Studies 7 (1953): 47-88. Based on H 4.22.
- Gantz, Jeffrey (tr.). Early Irish Myths and Sagas. London, 1981. 155-78. Based on LU, but omitting the interpolation of Chuchulainn's tescoc.
- Leahy, A. H., *The Sick-Bed of Cúchulainn, 1905
- Smith, Roland Mitchell (ed. and tr.). "On the Bríatharthecosc Conculain." Zeitschrift für celtische Philologie 15 (1924): 187-98. Based on part of the text, Cúchulainn's instruction.
