= Celtchar =

Character in Irish mythology

Celtchar, son of Uthechar or Uthidir, is a character from the Ulster Cycle of Irish Mythology. In Scéla Mucce Maic Dathó ("The Tale of Mac Dathó's Pig") he is described as "a grey, tall, very terrible hero of Ulster". When he challenges Cet mac Mágach for the champion's portion, Cet counters that he once emasculated Celtchar with a spear at Celtchar's own house. He lives in Dún Lethglaise, also known as the Mound of Down (Irish Dún), or Rathkeltair (Irish Ráth Celtchair or Celtchar's Fort) in Downpatrick, County Down. His wife is Findmór of Dún Sobairche (Dunseverick, County Antrim). He wields a spear or lance, the Lúin Cheltchair, whose lust for blood is so great it has to be dipped in a cauldron of poison to control it.

In the Táin Bó Cúailnge, after the Ulstermen have roused from their debility, he and Conchobar mac Nessa rescue eight captive Ulster women from eight men of Ailill and Medb's household at Áth Féinne.

In compensation for murdering Blaí Briugu, who had slept with his wife, Celtchar has to rid Ulster of three menaces. The first is Conganchnes mac Dedad, who seeks revenge for the death of his nephew Cú Roí, and who has skin like horn, which no weapon can pierce. Celtchar offers him his daughter Niam in marriage, who discovers that Conganchnes can only be killed by hammering red hot spits into the soles of his feet. She passes the information to her father, who does the deed. The second menace is a ferocious dog called Luch Donn ("brown mouse"). It had been found as a pup by a widow, who raised it until it was enormous and uncontrollable. It killed all the widow's sheep and cattle, then her sons, and finally the widow herself, and now it devastates a settlement every night. Celtchar finds an alder log, hollows it out so his arm will fit through it, and boils it in honey, grease and herbs until it is tough and supple. He approaches the dog with the log over his arm, and when the dog bites into it its teeth get stuck, enabling Celtchar to pull its heart out through its throat, killing it. The third menace is Dóelchú, Celtchar's own dog. It was found as a pup inside Conganchnes's burial mound, and would only let Celtchar handle it, until one day it escaped, and became a menace to the cattle and sheep of Ulster. Celtchar finds the dog and calls to it, and it comes and licks his feet. Reluctantly, Celtchar dispatches it with his spear. As he lifts the spear, a drop of the dog's poisonous blood runs down it and through Celtchar's body, killing him.

== See also ==
- Lúin of Celtchar
