= Cú Chulainn =

Irish mythological hero

- Hero and champion of Ulster
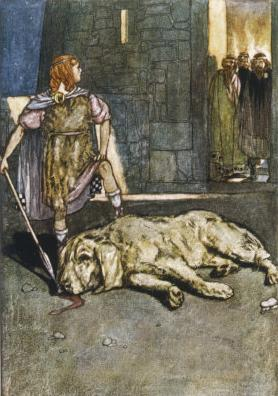
- "Setanta Slays the Hound of Culain", illustration by Stephen Reid from Eleanor Hull, The Boys' Cuchulain, 1904
- Other names: Sétanta
- Affiliation: Red Branch of Ulster
- Weapon: Gáe Bulg
- Texts: Ulster Cycle
- Ethnic group: Irish

Genealogy
- Parents: Lugh (father); Deichtine (mother)
- Spouse: Emer
- Children: Connla (by Aífe)

Cú Chulainn (/kuːˈkʌlɪn/ koo-KHUL-in Irish: [kuːˈxʊlˠɪn̠ʲ]) is an Irish warrior hero and demigod in the Ulster Cycle of Irish mythology, as well as in Scottish and Manx folklore. He is believed to be an incarnation of the Irish god Lugh, who is also his father. His mother is the mortal Deichtine, sister of King Conchobar mac Nessa.

Born Sétanta, he gained his better-known name as a child, after killing Culann's fierce guard dog in self-defence and offering to take its place until a replacement could be reared, hence he became the "Hound (cú) of Culann". He was trained in martial arts by Scáthach, who gave him the spear Gáe Bulg. It was prophesied that his great deeds would give him everlasting fame, but that his life would be short. At the age of seventeen he defended Ulster single-handedly against the armies of Queen Medb of Connacht in the famous Táin Bó Cúailnge ("Cattle Raid of Cooley"). He is known for his terrifying battle frenzy (ríastrad), in which he becomes an unrecognisable monster who knows neither friend nor foe. He fights from his chariot, driven by his loyal charioteer Láeg and drawn by his horses, Liath Macha and Dub Sainglend.

Cú Chulainn's wife is Emer, although he has many other lovers. With Aífe he has a son named Connla, whom Cú Chulainn tragically kills. Cú Chulainn himself is said to have died in battle, binding himself to a standing stone so he could die on his feet.

The image of Cú Chulainn is often depicted in pieces of art such as a bronze sculpture of the dying Cú Chulainn by Oliver Sheppard in the Dublin General Post Office (GPO) in commemoration of the Easter Rising of 1916 and stained glass panel of it in St. Enda's School. In literature, Cú Chulainn has been a central figure in many works. Lady Gregory retold many of the legends of Cú Chulainn in her 1902 book Cuchulain of Muirthemne, which paraphrased the originals but also romanticized some of the tales and omitted most of the more violent content.

== Name ==
His birth name Sétanta may be linked to a Celtic tribe, the Setantii, who dwelt on the west coast of Celtic Britain. His later name Cú Chulainn, is usually translated "Culann's hound", and was explained in the tale whereby he stood in for Culann's guard dog. Although cú literally means "hound", it was also a common figurative term for a warrior in early Irish literature, thus can also mean "Culann's warrior". Folklorist Dáithí Ó hÓgáin speculated that the second part of the name could come from an old Irish word for a chariot, cul, thus meaning "chariot-warrior".

== Legends ==
=== Birth ===
There are a number of versions of the story of Cú Chulainn's miraculous birth. In the earliest version of Compert C(h)on Culainn ("The Conception of Cú Chulainn"), his mother Deichtine is the daughter and charioteer of King Conchobar mac Nessa of Ulster, and accompanies him as he and the nobles of Ulster hunt a flock of magical birds. As snow begins to fall, Ulstermen seek shelter in a nearby house. As the host's wife goes into labour, Deichtine assists in the birth of a baby boy, while a mare gives birth to twin colts. The next morning, the Ulstermen find themselves at the Brug na Bóinde (the Neolithic mound at Newgrange)—the house and its occupants have disappeared, but the child and the colts remain. Deichtine takes the boy home and begins raising him as her own, but the boy falls ill and dies. The god Lug appears to her and tells her he was their host that night, and that he has put his child in her womb, who is to be called Sétanta. Her pregnancy turns into a scandal as she is betrothed to Sualtam mac Róich, and the Ulstermen suspect Conchobar of being the father, so she aborts the child and goes to her husband's bed "virgin-whole". She then conceives a son whom she names Sétanta.

In the later and better-known version of Compert Con Culainn, Deichtine is Conchobar's sister, and disappears from Emain Macha, the Ulster capital. As in the previous version, the Ulstermen go hunting a flock of magical birds, are overtaken by a snowstorm and seek shelter in a nearby house. Their host is Lug, a member of the Tuatha Dé Danann, but this time his wife, who gives birth to a son that night, is Deichtine herself. The child is named Sétanta.

The nobles of Ulster argue over which of them is to be his foster father, until the wise Morann decides he should be fostered by several of them: Conchobar himself; Sencha mac Ailella, who will teach him judgement and eloquent speech; the wealthy Blaí Briugu, who will protect and provide for him; the noble warrior Fergus mac Róich, who will care for him and teach him to protect the weak; the poet Amergin, who will educate him, and his wife Findchóem, who will nurse him. He is brought up in the house of Amergin and Findchóem on Muirthemne Plain in modern County Louth (at the time part of Ulster), alongside their son Conall Cernach.

In another version, the child is named Sédana, and the name is given to him by Ceat mac Mágach. Ceat takes Sédana into fosterage and gives him to his own foster parents, Srían and Gabur, to nurse; they are the parents of Láeg, Cú Chulainn's charioteer, and so the pair grow up together from infancy.

The County Louth town of Dundalk has the motto Mé do rug Cú Chulainn cróga (Irish) "I gave birth to brave Cú Chulainn".

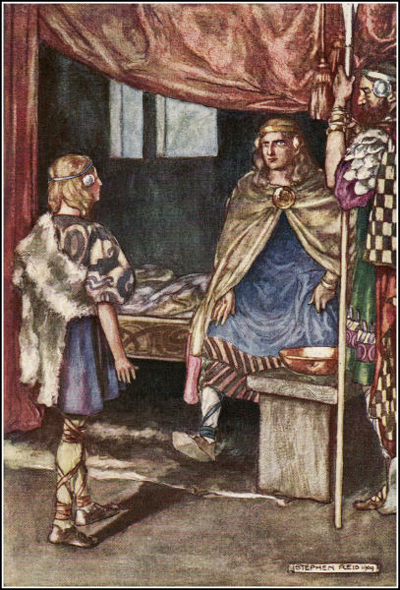
"Cuchulain Desires Arms of the King", illustration by Stephen Reid in Eleanor Hull's The Boys' Cuchulain, 1904

=== Childhood ===
The stories of Cú Chulainn's childhood are told in a flashback sequence in Táin Bó Cúailnge. As a small child, living in his parents' house on Muirthemne Plain, he begs to be allowed to join the boy-troop at Emain Macha. However, he sets off on his own, and when he arrives at Emain he runs onto the playing field without first asking for the boys' protection, being unaware of the custom. The boys take this as a challenge and attack him, but he has a ríastrad (transformative battle frenzy) and beats them single-handed. Conchobar puts a stop to the fight and clears up the misunderstanding, but no sooner has Sétanta put himself under the boys' protection than he chases after them, demanding they put themselves under his protection.

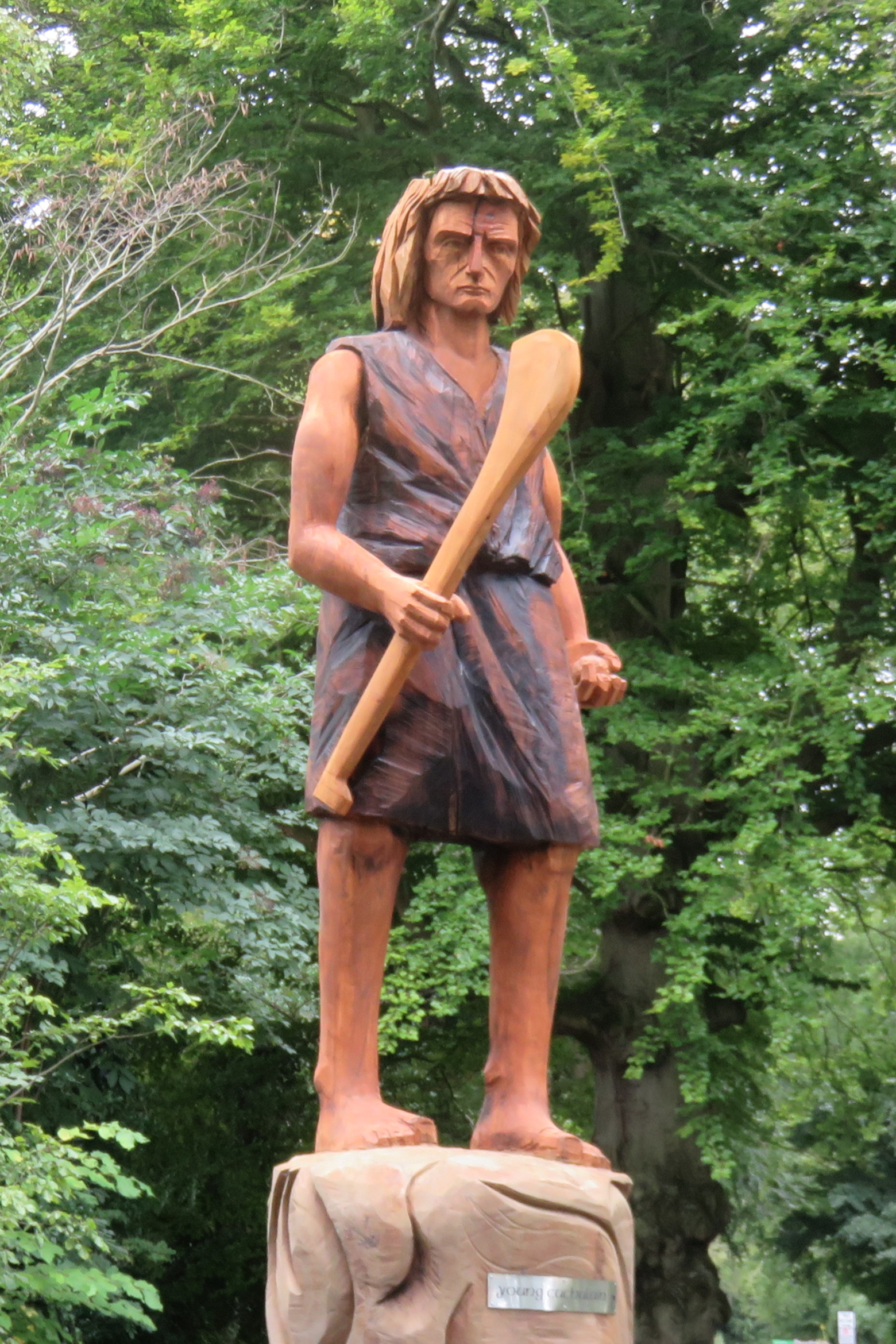
Young Cú Chulainn depicted with sliotar and hurley in a wooden sculpture in Lucan

Culann the smith invites Conchobar to a feast at his house. Before going, Conchobar goes to the playing field to watch the boys play hurling. He is so impressed by Sétanta's performance that he asks him to join him at the feast. Sétanta has a game to finish, but promises to follow the king later. But when Culann asks if anyone will be arriving late to the feast, Conchobar forgets about Sétanta, and Culann lets loose his ferocious hound to protect his house. When Sétanta arrives, the enormous hound attacks him, but he kills it in self defence, in one version by smashing it against a standing stone, and in another by driving a sliotar (hurling ball) down its throat with his hurley. Culann is devastated by the loss of his hound, so Sétanta promises he will rear him a replacement, and until it is old enough to do the job, he himself will guard Culann's house. The druid Cathbad announces that his name henceforth will be Cú Chulainn—"Culann's Hound".

One day at Emain Macha, Cú Chulainn overhears Cathbad teaching his pupils. One asks him what that day is auspicious for, and Cathbad replies that any warrior who takes arms that day will have everlasting fame. Cú Chulainn, though only seven years old, goes to Conchobar and asks for arms. None of the weapons given to him withstand his strength, until Conchobar gives him his own weapons. But when Cathbad sees this he grieves, because he had not finished his prophecy—the warrior who took arms that day would be famous, but his life would be short. Soon afterwards, in response to a similar prophecy by Cathbad, Cú Chulainn demands a chariot from Conchobar, and only the king's own chariot withstands him. He sets off on a foray and kills the three sons of Nechtan Scéne, who had boasted they had killed more Ulstermen than there were Ulstermen still living. He returns to Emain Macha in his battle frenzy, and the Ulstermen are afraid he will slaughter them all. Conchobar's wife Mugain leads out the women of Emain, and they bare their breasts to him. He averts his eyes, and the Ulstermen wrestle him into a barrel of cold water, which explodes from the heat of his body. They put him in a second barrel, which boils, and a third, which warms to a pleasant temperature.

=== Emer and Cú Chulainn's training ===
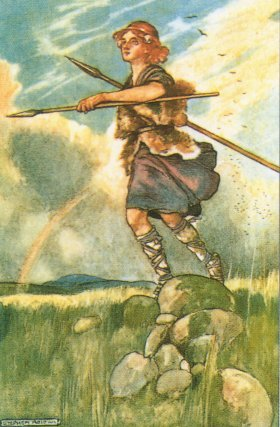
Young Cú Chulainn by Stephen Reid

In Cú Chulainn's youth he is so beautiful the Ulstermen worry that, without a wife of his own, he will steal their wives and ruin their daughters. They search all over Ireland for a suitable wife for him, but he will have none but Emer, daughter of Forgall Monach. However, Forgall is opposed to the match. He suggests that Cú Chulainn should train in arms with the renowned warrior-woman Scáthach in the land of Alba (Scotland), hoping the ordeal will be too much for him and he will be killed. Cú Chulainn takes up the challenge, travelling to her residence Dún Scáith (Fortress of Shadows) on the Isle of Skye. In the meantime, Forgall offers Emer to Lugaid mac Nóis, a king of Munster, but when he hears that Emer loves Cú Chulainn, Lugaid refuses her hand, especially because Cú Chulainn is his foster brother.

Scáthach teaches Cú Chulainn all the arts of war, including the use of the Gáe Bulg, a terrible barbed spear, thrown with the foot, that has to be cut out of its victim. His fellow trainees include Ferdiad, who becomes Cú Chulainn's best friend and foster brother. The two foster brothers share a very close relationship, sharing a bed at times and speaking often and at great length of their love for one another; this has at times led to speculation that the two men were lovers (though this theory is controversial). During his time there, Scáthach faces a battle against Aífe, her rival and in some versions her twin sister. Scáthach, knowing Aífe's prowess, fears for Cú Chulainn's life and gives him a powerful sleeping potion to keep him from the battle. However, because of Cú Chulainn's great strength, it only puts him to sleep for an hour, and he soon joins the fray. He fights Aífe in single combat, and the two are evenly matched, but Cú Chulainn distracts her by calling out that Aífe's horses and chariot, the things she values most in the world, have fallen off a cliff, and seizes her. With his sword at her throat, he agrees to spare her life on the condition that she call off her enmity with Scáthach, and bear him a son.

Leaving Aífe pregnant, Cú Chulainn returns from Scotland fully trained, but Forgall still refuses to let him marry Emer. Cú Chulainn storms Forgall's fortress, killing twenty-four of Forgall's men, abducts Emer and steals Forgall's treasure. Forgall himself falls from the ramparts to his death. Conchobar has the "right of the first night" over all marriages of his subjects. He is afraid of Cú Chulainn's reaction if he exercises it in this case, but is equally afraid of losing his authority if he does not. Cathbad suggests a solution: Conchobar sleeps with Emer on the night of the wedding, but Cathbad sleeps between them.

=== Killing his son ===
Eight years later, Connla, Cú Chulainn's son by Aífe, comes to Ireland in search of his father, but Cú Chulainn takes him as an intruder and kills him when he refuses to identify himself. Connla does not identify himself, as his mother Aífe bound him to not identify himself or back down from a challenge. She does this as she wishes revenge upon Cú Chulainn for loving another woman after her. Connla was also trained and almost beat his father in battle, but misses his spear shot on purpose as he finds out Cú Chulainn is his father. However Cú Chulainn hits Connla with his spear, the Gae Bulg, which mortally wounds him. Connla's last words to his father as he dies are that they would have "carried the flag of Ulster to the gates of Rome and beyond", leaving Cú Chulainn grief-stricken. The story of Cú Chulainn and Connla shows a striking similarity to the legend of Persian hero Rostam who also kills his son Sohrab. Rostam and Cú Chulainn share several other characteristics, including killing a ferocious beast at a very young age, their near invincibility in battle, and the manner of their deaths. Another similar myth is found in the Hildebrandslied, in which Hildebrand is thought to kill his son, Hadubrand, though the poem's ending is lost.

=== Lugaid and Derbforgaill ===
During his time abroad, Cú Chulainn had rescued Derbforgaill, a Scandinavian princess, from being sacrificed to the Fomorians. She falls in love with him, and she and her handmaid come to Ireland in search of him in the form of a pair of swans. Cú Chulainn, not realising who she is, shoots her down with his sling, and then saves her life by sucking the stone from her side. Having tasted her blood, he cannot marry her, and gives her to his foster-son Lugaid Riab nDerg. Lugaid goes on to become High King of Ireland, but the Lia Fáil (stone of destiny) fails to cry out when he stands on it, so Cú Chulainn splits it in two with his sword. When Derbforgaill is mutilated by the women of Ulster out of jealousy for her sexual desirability and dies of her wounds, Lugaid dies of grief, and Cú Chulainn avenges them by demolishing the house the women are inside, killing 150 of them.

=== The Cattle Raid of Cooley ===
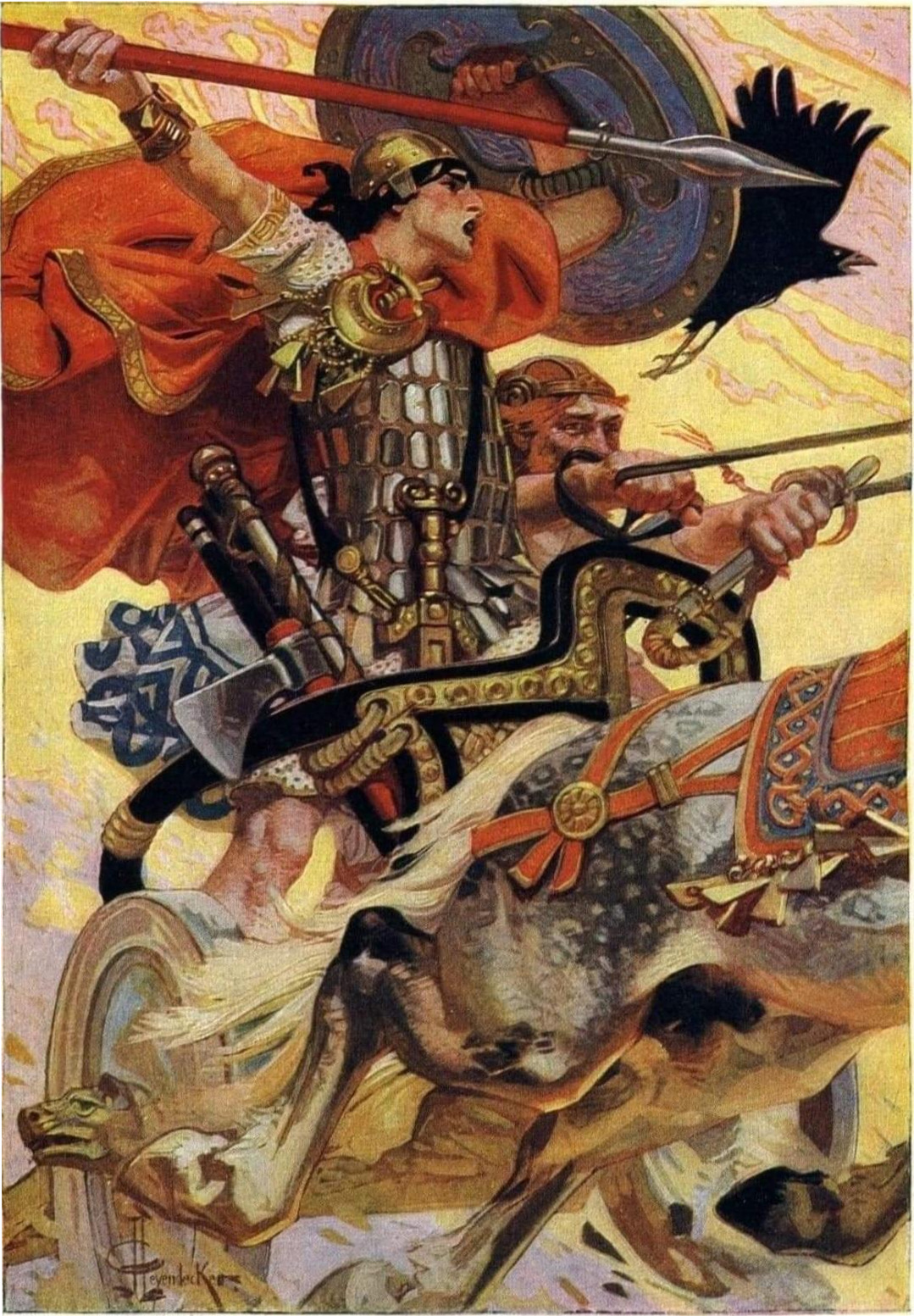
"Cuchulain in Battle", illustration by J. C. Leyendecker in T. W. Rolleston's Myths & Legends of the Celtic Race, 1911

At the age of seventeen, Cú Chulainn single-handedly defends Ulster from the army of Connacht in the Táin Bó Cúailnge. Queen Medb of Connacht mounted the invasion to steal the stud bull Donn Cúailnge, Cú Chulainn allows her to take Ulster by surprise because he was with a woman when he should have been watching the border. The men of Ulster were disabled by a curse that caused them to suffer from labour pains, so it becomes Cú Chulainn's job to stop Medb's army from advancing further. He does this by invoking the right of single combat at fords. He defeats champion after champion in a standoff that lasts for months.

Before one combat a beautiful young woman comes to him, claiming to be the daughter of a king, and offers him her love, but he refuses her. The woman reveals herself as the Morrígan, and in revenge for this slight, she attacks him in various animal forms while he is engaged in combat against Lóch mac Mofemis. As an eel, she trips him in the ford, but he breaks her ribs. As a wolf, she stampedes cattle across the ford, but he blinds her eye with a sling stone. Finally, she appears as a heifer at the head of the stampede, but he breaks her leg with another sling stone. After Cú Chulainn finally defeats Lóch, the Morrígan appears to him as an old woman milking a cow, with the same injuries he had given her in her animal forms. She gives him three drinks of milk, and with each drink he blesses her, healing her wounds.

After one particularly arduous combat, Cú Chulainn lies severely wounded but is visited by Lug, who tells him he is his father and heals his wounds. When Cú Chulainn wakes up and sees that the boy-troop of Emain Macha have attacked the Connacht army and been slaughtered, he has his most spectacular ríastrad yet:

The first warp-spasm seized Cúchulainn, and made him into a monstrous thing, hideous and shapeless, unheard of. His shanks and his joints, every knuckle and angle and organ from head to foot, shook like a tree in the flood or a reed in the stream. His body made a furious twist inside his skin, so that his feet and shins switched to the rear and his heels and calves switched to the front... On his head the temple-sinews stretched to the nape of his neck, each mighty, immense, measureless knob as big as the head of a month-old child... he sucked one eye so deep into his head that a wild crane couldn't probe it onto his cheek out of the depths of his skull; the other eye fell out along his cheek. His mouth weirdly distorted: his cheek peeled back from his jaws until the gullet appeared, his lungs and his liver flapped in his mouth and throat, his lower jaw struck the upper a lion-killing blow, and fiery flakes large as a ram's fleece reached his mouth from his throat... The hair of his head twisted like the tangle of a red thornbush stuck in a gap; if a royal apple tree with all its kingly fruit were shaken above him, scarce an apple would reach the ground but each would be spiked on a bristle of his hair as it stood up on his scalp with rage.

— Thomas Kinsella (translator), The Táin, Oxford University Press, 1969, pp. 150–153

He attacks the army and kills hundreds, building walls of corpses.

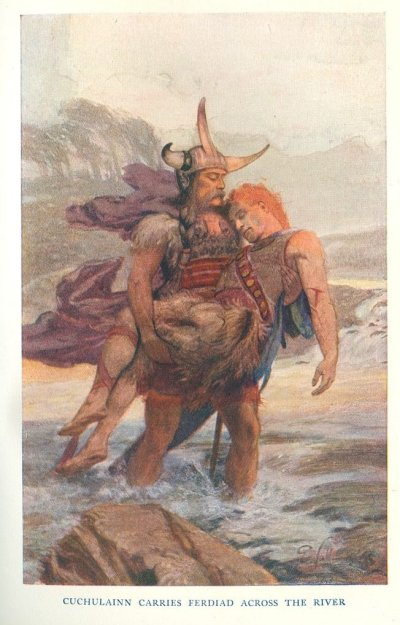
"Cuchulainn Carries Ferdiad Across the River", illustration by Ernest Wallcousins from Charles Squire, Celtic Myths and Legends, 1905

When his foster father Fergus mac Róich, now in exile in Medb's court, is sent to face him, Cú Chulainn agrees to yield, so long as Fergus agrees to return the favour the next time they meet. Finally, he fights a gruelling three-day duel with his best friend and foster brother, Ferdiad, at a ford that was named Áth Fhir Diadh (Ardee, County Louth) after him.

The Ulstermen eventually rouse, one by one at first, and finally en masse. The final battle begins. Cú Chulainn stays on the sidelines, recuperating from his wounds, until he sees Fergus advancing. He enters the fray and confronts Fergus, who keeps his side of the bargain and yields to him, pulling his forces off the field. Connacht's other allies panic and Medb is forced to retreat. At this inopportune moment she gets her period, and although Fergus forms a guard around her, Cú Chulainn breaks through as she is dealing with it and has her at his mercy. However, he spares her because he does not think it right to kill women, and guards her retreat back to Connacht as far as Athlone.

=== Bricriu's Feast ===
The troublemaker Bricriu once incites three heroes, Cú Chulainn, Conall Cernach and Lóegaire Búadach, to compete for the champion's portion at his feast. In every test that is set, Cú Chulainn comes out on top, but neither Conall nor Lóegaire will accept the result. Cú Roí mac Dáire of Munster settles it by visiting each in the guise of a hideous churl and challenging them to behead him, then allow him to return and behead them in return. Conall and Lóegaire both behead Cú Roí, who picks up his head and leaves, but when the time comes for him to return they flee. Only Cú Chulainn is brave and honourable enough to submit himself to Cú Roí's axe; Cú Roí spares him and he is declared champion. This beheading challenge appears in later literature, most notably in the Middle English poem Sir Gawain and the Green Knight. Other examples include the 13th century French Life of Caradoc and the English romances The Turke and Gowin, and Sir Gawain and the Carle of Carlisle.

=== The Death of Cú Roí ===
Cú Roí, again in disguise, joins the Ulstermen on a raid on Inis Fer Falga (probably the Isle of Man), in return for his choice of the spoils. They steal treasure, and abduct Blathnát, daughter of the island's king, who loves Cú Chulainn. But when Cú Roí is asked to choose his share, he chooses Blathnát. Cú Chulainn tries to stop him taking her, but Cú Roí cuts his hair and drives him into the ground up to his armpits before escaping, taking Blathnát with him. Like other heroes such as the Biblical Samson, Duryodhana in the Mahabharata and the Welsh Llew Llaw Gyffes, Cú Roí can only be killed in certain contrived circumstances, which vary in different versions of the story. Blathnát discovers how to kill him and betrays him to Cú Chulainn, who does the deed. However, Ferchertne, Cú Roí's poet, enraged at the betrayal of his lord, grabs Blathnát and leaps off a cliff, killing her and himself.

=== Emer's only jealousy ===
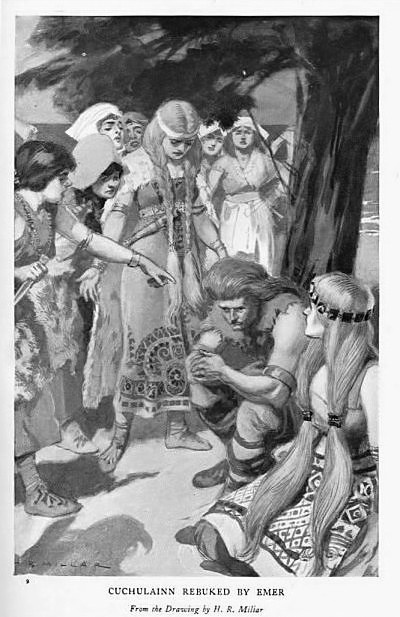
"Cúchulainn rebuked by Emer", illustration by H. R. Millar from Charles Squire, Celtic Myths and Legends, 1905

Cú Chulainn has many lovers, but Emer's only jealousy comes when he falls in love with Fand, wife of Manannán mac Lir. Manannán has left her and she has been attacked by three Fomorians who want to control the Irish Sea. Cú Chulainn agrees to help defend her as long as she marries him. She agrees reluctantly, but they fall in love when they meet. Manannán knows their relationship is doomed because Cú Chulainn is mortal and Fand is a fairy; Cú Chulainn's presence would destroy the fairies. Emer, meanwhile, tries to kill her rival, but when she sees the strength of Fand's love for Cú Chulainn she decides to give him up to her. Fand, touched by Emer's magnanimity, decides to return to her own husband. Manannán shakes his cloak between Cú Chulainn and Fand, ensuring the two will never meet again, and Cú Chulainn and Emer drink a potion to wipe the whole affair from their memories.

=== Death ===
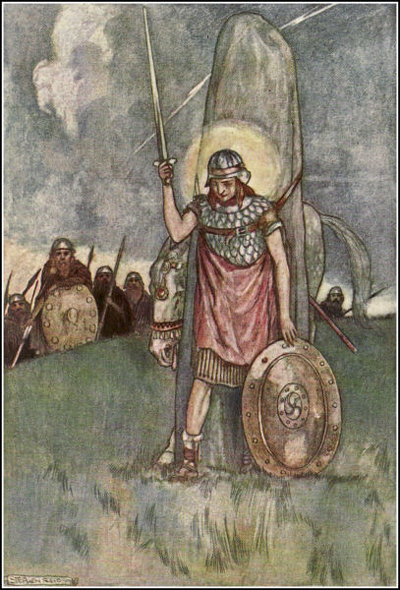
"Cuchulain's death", illustration by Stephen Reid in Eleanor Hull's The Boys' Cuchulain, 1904

(Irish: Aided Con Culainn, also known as Brislech Mór Maige Muirthemne). Medb conspires with Lugaid, son of Cú Roí, Erc, son of Cairbre Nia Fer, and the sons of others Cú Chulainn had killed, to draw him out to his death. His fate is sealed by his breaking of the geasa (taboos) upon him. Cú Chulainn's geasa included a ban against eating dog meat, but in early Ireland there was a powerful general taboo against refusing hospitality, so when an old crone offers him a meal of dog meat, he has no choice but to break his geis. In this way he is spiritually weakened for the fight ahead of him. Lugaid has three magical spears made, and it is prophesied that a king will fall by each of them. With the first he kills Cú Chulainn's charioteer Láeg, king of chariot drivers. With the second he kills Cú Chulainn's horse, Liath Macha, king of horses. With the third he hits Cú Chulainn, mortally wounding him. Cú Chulainn ties himself to a standing stone to die on his feet, facing his enemies. This stone is traditionally identified as Clochafarmore, located near Dundalk. Due to his ferocity even when so near death, it is only when a raven lands on his shoulder that his enemies believe he is dead. Lugaid approaches and cuts off his head, but as he does so the "hero-light" burns around Cú Chulainn and his sword falls from his hand and cuts Lugaid's hand off. The light disappears only after his right hand, his sword arm, is cut from his body. According to the Annals, Cú Chulainn died in the year AD 1.

Conall Cernach had sworn that if Cú Chulainn died before him he would avenge him before sunset, and when he hears Cú Chulainn is dead he pursues Lugaid. As Lugaid has lost a hand, Conall fights him with one hand tucked into his belt, but he only beats him after his horse takes a bite out of Lugaid's side. He also kills Erc, and takes his head back to Tara, where Erc's sister Achall dies of grief for her brother.

=== Appearance ===
Cú Chulainn's appearance is occasionally remarked on in the texts. He is usually described as small, youthful and beardless. He is often described as dark: in The Wooing of Emer and Bricriu's Feast he is "a dark, sad man, comeliest of the men of Erin", in The Intoxication of the Ulstermen he is a "little, black-browed man", and in The Phantom Chariot of Cú Chulainn "[h]is hair was thick and black, and smooth as though a cow had licked it... in his head his eyes gleamed swift and grey"; yet the prophetess Fedelm in the Táin Bó Cúailnge describes him as blond. The description of his appearance comes later in the Táin:

And certainly the youth Cúchulainn mac Sualdaim was handsome as he came to show his form to the armies. You would think he had three distinct heads of hair—brown at the base, blood-red in the middle, and a crown of golden yellow. This hair was settled strikingly into three coils on the cleft at the back of his head. Each long loose-flowing strand hung down in shining splendour over his shoulders, deep-gold and beautiful and fine as a thread of gold. A hundred neat red-gold curls shone darkly on his neck, and his head was covered with a hundred crimson threads matted with gems. He had four dimples in each cheek—yellow, green, crimson and blue—and seven bright pupils, eye-jewels, in each kingly eye. Each foot had seven toes and each hand seven fingers, the nails with the grip of a hawk's claw or a gryphon's clench.

— Thomas Kinsella (translator), The Táin, Oxford University Press, 1969, pp. 156–158

== Later stories ==
=== Siabur-Charpat Con Culaind ===
The Siabur-Charpat Con Culaind (or "Demonic Chariot of Cu Chulaind") tells the story of when Saint Patrick was trying to convert King Lóegaire to Christianity.

In the tale St. Patrick visited King Loegaire, attempting to convert him to the Christian faith. The king agreed but on a condition: that the saint call up Cu Chulainn from the dead, bringing him to the king's presence. St. Patrick agreed, and then the hero appeared, complete with the chariot, and his two horses Liath Macha and Dub-Sainglend, together with his charioteer Loeg. The saint asks if the king is convinced – he replies that the appearance was so short he was not yet sure. The saint responds that God is so powerful that the king would see the hero again.

The ghostly hero returns, and this time salutes and addresses the saint, he then turns to the king, confirms it is Cu Chulainn he sees and not some demon, and implores him to believe in the saint and his god. A dialogue between king and ghostly hero takes place, in which the old hero recounts his life, including a poetic telling of his heroic deeds, ending with a request to Patrick to allow him too into heaven – the king is convinced. At the end of this, the saint declares that Cu Chulainn is welcome in heaven.

The date of the tale is possibly around late tenth century or perhaps to the early eleventh century.

=== A Legend of Knockmany ===
Cú Chulainn was later reimagined as an evil giant at odds with Fionn mac Cumhaill (or Finn McCool).

Unrecorded before the nineteenth century, the earliest known version was "A Legend of Knockmany" in the 1845 Tales and Sketches ... of the Irish Peasantry by William Carleton. Variants were published in Patrick Kennedy's Legendary Fictions of the Irish Celts (1866), and republished and brought to a larger audience by W. B. Yeats in Fairy and Folk Tales of the Irish Peasantry (1888), followed by numerous adaptations and variants, many uncredited. The work was included in later collections of 'folk tales' by other editors such as Joseph Jacobs in his Celtic Fairy Tales (1890).

In this tale, Cú Chulainn's power was contained in his middle finger. Wishing to defeat Finn, he came to Finn's house, but Finn disguised himself as a baby while his wife Oona baked cakes, some with griddle irons inside, some without. When Cú Chulainn could not bite through his cake (which had an iron in it) but the baby could (Finn's cake had no iron), in amazement Cú Chulainn felt to see how sharp the baby's teeth were, allowing Finn to bite his middle finger off and deprive Cú Chulainn of both his strength and size.

== Indo-European parallels ==
Cú Chulainn shows striking similarities to the legendary Persian hero Rostam, as well as to the Germanic Lay of Hildebrand and the labours of the Greek epic hero Heracles, suggesting a common Indo-European origin, but lacking in linguistic, anthropological and archaeological material. Cú Chulainn's smiting of the hound with a hurling stick is reminiscent of the tenth labour of Heracles, in which Heracles is charged with stealing the cattle of Geryon and is attacked by a two-headed hound, which he dispatches with a club.

Additional Indo-European typological parallels include Lithuanian Velnias, who like Cú Chulainn is the protector of cattle, and Romulus, who is associated with a canine in his youth and is surrounded by a youthful band of warriors (the maccrad in the case of Cú Chulainn).

== Cultural depictions ==
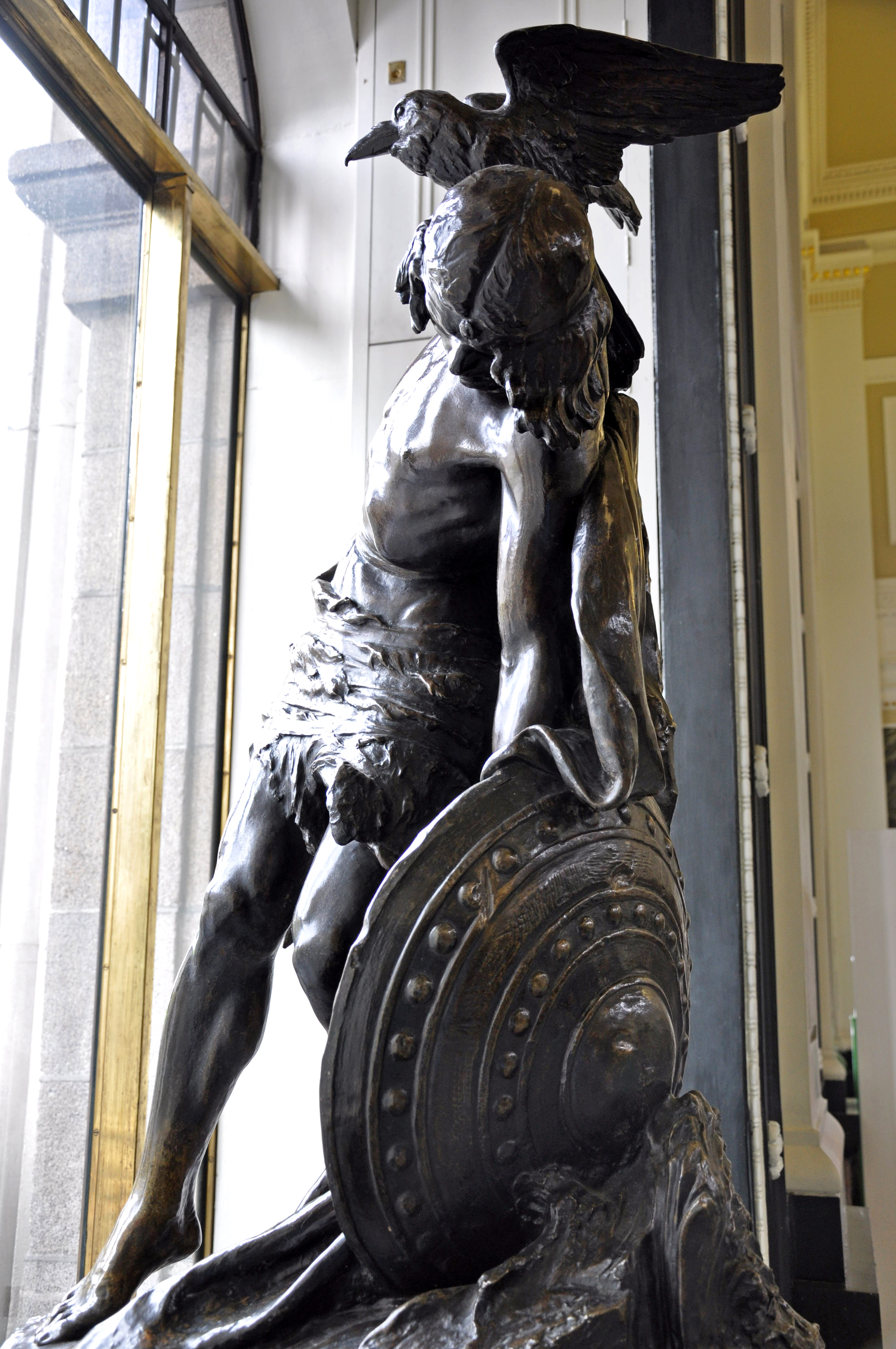
The Dying Cuchulain by Oliver Sheppard (1911), now at the GPO, Dublin

=== Images ===
The image of Cú Chulainn is often invoked by Irish nationalists. The Gaelic revival fed into the Irish revolutionary period, with elements of Irish mythology adopted in nationalist symbolism. In St. Enda's School, run by revolutionary Patrick Pearse, there was a stained-glass panel of Cú Chulainn. A bronze sculpture of the dying Cú Chulainn by Oliver Sheppard stands in the Dublin General Post Office (GPO) in commemoration of the Easter Rising of 1916. Éamon de Valera unveiled the statue in 1935 as President of the Executive Council (Prime Minister) and described Sheppard's work as "symbolising the dauntless courage and abiding constancy of our people". The statue's image is reproduced on the obverse of 1916 Medal awarded to republican veterans of the rising, the Military Star of the Irish Defence Forces, and the commemorative ten shilling coin issued in 1966 for the rising's 50th anniversary. He is also depicted in several murals in nationalist areas of Northern Ireland. An example is the mural painted in 1996 on Lenadoon Avenue, Belfast commemorating Provisional IRA members from the area, which shows Cú Chulainn in the centre.

More recently, some Ulster loyalists have also invoked the image of Cú Chulainn, depicting him as an ancient "defender of Ulster" from Irish enemies to the south. This is based on Ian Adamson's widely rejected theory that Cú Chulainn was a Cruthin hero and that they were a non-Celtic people who were at war with the Gaels. He is depicted in a loyalist mural on Highfield Drive, and was formerly depicted in another on the Newtownards Road, Belfast.

A statue of Cú Chulainn carrying the body of Fer Diad stands in Ardee, County Louth, traditionally the site of their combat in the Táin Bó Cúailnge. A sculpture by Martin Heron, entitled "For the Love of Emer", depicting Cú Chulainn balancing on a tilting 20-foot pole, representing the feat of balancing on the butt of a spear he learned from Scáthach, was installed in Armagh in 2010.

=== Literature ===
Augusta, Lady Gregory retold many of the legends of Cú Chulainn in her 1902 book Cuchulain of Muirthemne, which paraphrased the originals but also romanticized some of the tales and omitted most of the more violent content. It was very popular, supported by the Celtic Revival movement. It featured an introduction by her friend William Butler Yeats, who wrote several pieces based on the legend, including the plays On Baile's Strand (1904), The Green Helmet (1910), At the Hawk's Well (1917), The Only Jealousy of Emer (1919) and The Death of Cuchulain (1939), and the poems Cuchulain's Fight with the Sea (1892) and Cuchulain Comforted (1939), the latter completed two weeks before his death. An tAthair Peadar Ua Laoghaire, a priest from Castlelyons in County Cork, serialised the Táin Bó Cúailnge on a weekly basis in The Cork Examiner between 1900 and 1901 as part of the Gaelic revival. Pádraig Pearse, another revivalist age writer and member of Conradh na Gaeilge mentions Cú Chulainn in his 1912 his Irish language poem Mise Éire where Pearse personifies Ireland as a mother figure who gave birth to Cú Chulainn, but whose glory days are behind her. Sheppard's statue of Cú Chulainn is depicted in Samuel Beckett's 1938 novel Murphy as a vice to mock the Irish Free State and the attitude of its inhabitants. The story of Cú Chulainn and many other characters from Irish Béaloideas tales such as Fionn mac Cumhaill are still taught as part of the Irish primary school curriculum in both the Republic and Northern Ireland.

== See also ==
- Setanta College, a sports college, named after Cu Chulainn's given name, due to his legendary hurling prowess.

== Sources ==
- Compert Con Culainn (Recension I), ed. A.G. van Hamel (1933). Compert Con Culainn and Other Stories. Mediaeval and Modern Irish Series 3. Dublin: DIAS. pp. 1–8.
- Compert Con Culainn (Recension II), ed. Kuno Meyer (1905). "Mitteilungen aus irischen Handschriften: Feis Tige Becfoltaig". Zeitschrift für celtische Philologie. 5: 500–4 (from D IV 2).; ed. Ernst Windisch (1880). Irische Texte mit Wörterbuch. Vol. 1. Leipzig: Von S. Hirzel. pp. 143–5 and 140–2 (from Egerton 1782).
- Tochmarc Emire (Recension I), ed. and tr. Kuno Meyer (1890). "The Oldest Version of Tochmarc Emire". Revue Celtique. 11: 433–57. CELT link.
- Tochmarc Emire (Recension II), ed. A.G. van Hamel (1933). Compert Con Culainn and Other Stories. Mediaeval and Modern Irish Series 3. Dublin: DIAS.; tr. Kuno Meyer (1888). "The Wooing of Emer". Archaeological Review. 1: 68–75, 150–5, 231–5, 298–307.
- Serglige Con Culainn, ed. Myles Dillon (1953). Serglige Con Culainn. Mediaeval and Modern Irish Series 14. Dublin: DIAS.; tr. Jeffrey Gantz (1981). Early Irish Myths and Sagas. London: Penguin. pp. 155–78.
- Kinsella, Thomas (1969). The Táin. Oxford University Press. ISBN 0-19-281090-1.

Modern literature

- Sutcliff, Rosemary (1992). The Hound of Ulster. London: Red Fox.
