= Dunscaith Castle =

Castle in Highland, Scotland

Coordinates: 57°8′11.4″N 5°58′32.76″W

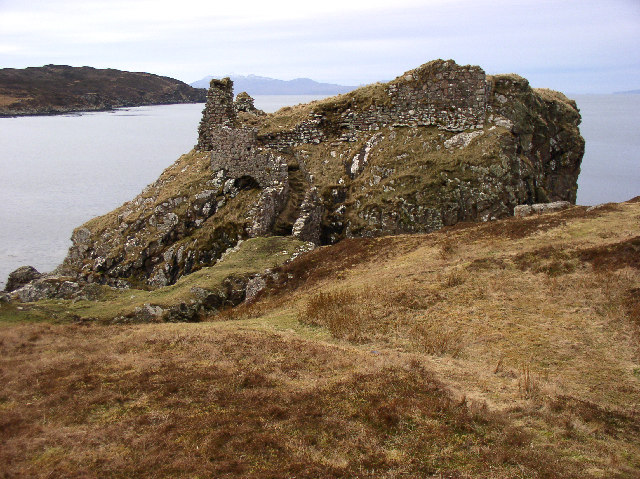
Dunscaith Castle

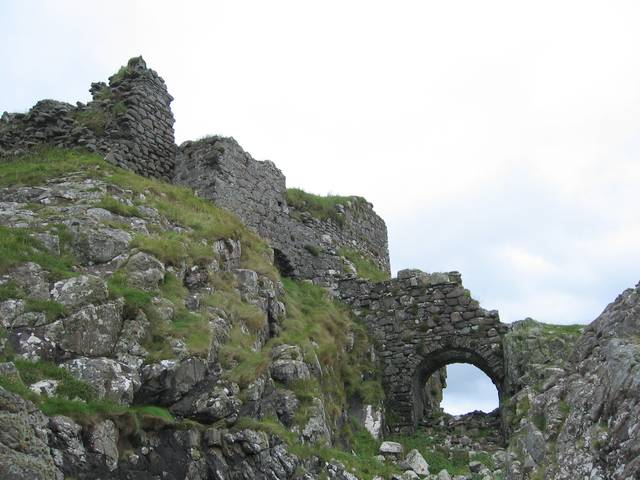
View from below.

Dunscaith Castle also known as Dun Scaich, Dun Sgathaich Castle and Tokavaig, is a ruined castle on the coast of the Isle of Skye, in the north-west of Scotland. It is located in the Parish of Sleat, in the Highland council area, and in the former county of Inverness-shire, at grid reference NG595120. Also called "Fortress of Shadows", it is the legendary home of the warrior maiden Scáthach, after whom it is named. It is protected as a scheduled monument.

== History ==
The castle itself sits on an off-shore rock. The rock rises 40 feet (12 metres) above sea level and there is a gap of 20 feet (6 metres) between the rock and the mainland. The gap was once spanned by a walled bridge with arches six feet (1.8 metres) apart. This stone walled bridge then led onto a drawbridge, the pivot holes for which are still visible on the far side. Once on the other side of the drawbridge a door opened to a flight of stairs which was also sided by two walls. The flight of stairs led up to the castle.

Parts of the castle curtain wall still survive on the cliff edge but most of the inner buildings have gone. The curtain wall was about five feet (1.5 metres) thick. In the courtyard is a well and the remains of a stairway which once led up a tower.

The castle originated in the 1300s as a stronghold on the Isle of Skye for a Viking group led by Gilbert MacAskill, grandson of the Norse explorer Ascall mac Ragnaill. The MacAskills held the castle until at some point before 1395, the castle was taken by the Clan MacDonald of Sleat, a branch of the Clan Donald or MacDonald. In the 14th century it was taken from them by the Clan MacLeod and held briefly back by the MacAskills, allies of the MacLeods, but it was recaptured by the MacDonalds sometime in the 15th century.

In the 15th century the castle was again captured by King James IV of Scotland when the Chief of the Clan Donald, Lord of the Isles was broken by King James IV. The MacDonalds were allowed to keep possession of the castle. The MacDonalds abandoned the castle in the early 17th century, after which it slowly fell into ruin.

== Legend ==
The castle is featured in the Ulster Cycle of Irish mythology as the place where Scáthach the Shadow, legendary Scottish warrior woman and martial arts teacher, trained the hero Cú Chulainn in the arts of combat. The Irish name for the fort, Dún Scáthaigh, is derived from hers.

== See also ==
- List of castles in Scotland
- Historic Environment Scotland
