= Scáthach =

Figure in the Ulster Cycle of Irish mythology

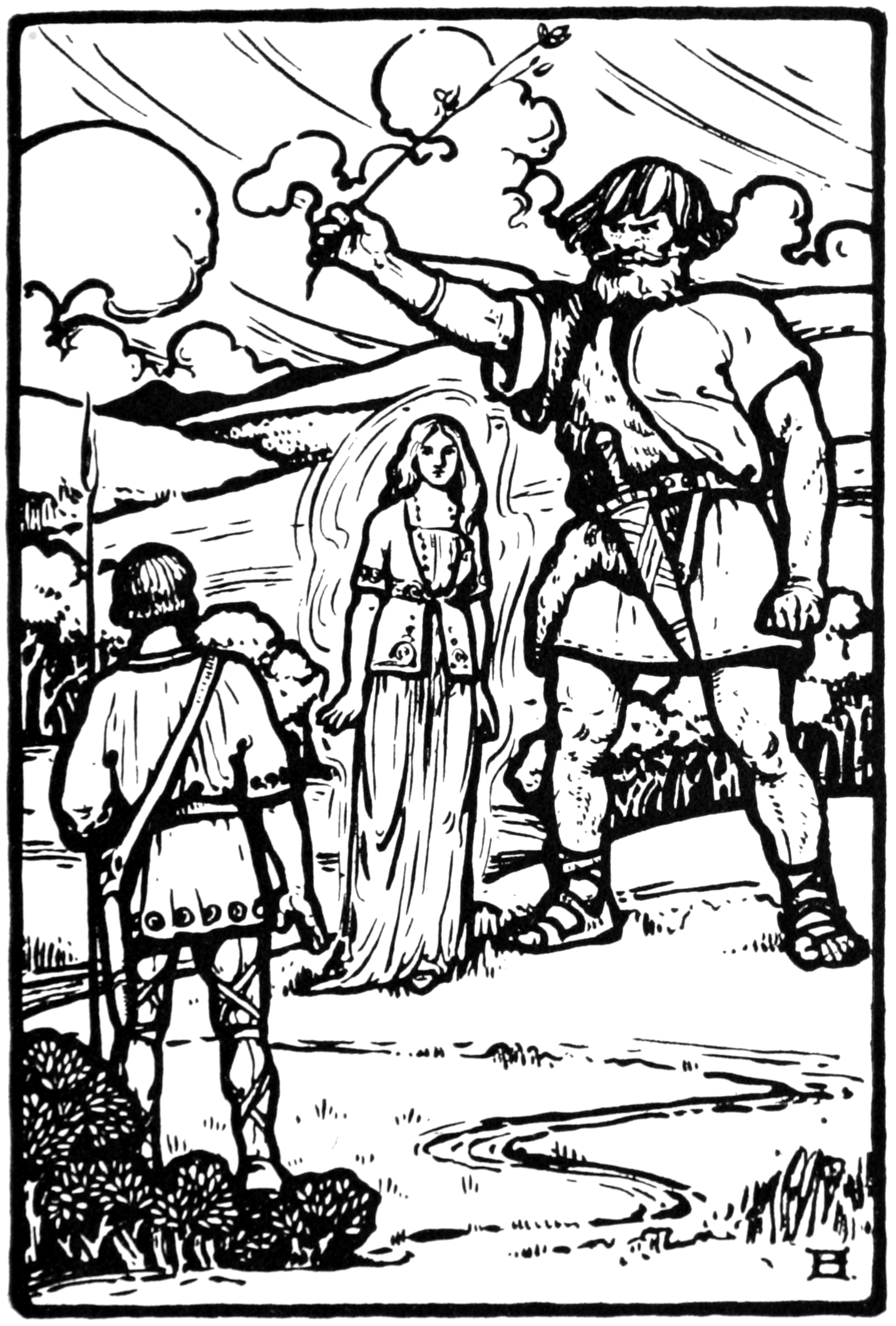
Scáthach, illustrated by Beatrice Elvery, from Heroes of the Dawn, 1914

Scáthach (Irish: [ˈsˠkaːhəx]) or Sgàthach (Scottish Gaelic: Sgàthach an Eilean Sgitheanach) is a figure in the Ulster Cycle of Irish mythology. She is a legendary Scottish warrior woman and martial arts teacher who trains the legendary Ulster hero Cú Chulainn in the arts of combat. Texts describe her homeland as Scotland (Alpeach); she is especially associated with the Isle of Skye, where her residence Dún Scáith ("Fortress of Shadows") stands. She is called "the Shadow" and "Warrior Maid" and is the rival and sister of Aífe, both of whom are daughters of Árd-Greimne of Lethra.

== Appearances ==
Scáthach's instruction of the young hero Cú Chulainn notably appears in Tochmarc Emire (The Wooing of Emer), an early Irish foretale to the great epic Táin Bó Cúailnge. Here, Cú Chulainn is honour-bound to perform a number of tasks before he is found worthy to marry his beloved Emer, daughter of the chieftain Forgall Monach. The tale survives in two recensions: a short version written mainly in Old Irish and a later, expanded version of the Middle Irish period. In both recensions, Cú Chulainn is sent to Alpae, a term literally meaning "the Alps", but apparently used here to refer to Scotland (otherwise Albu in Irish). Cú Chulainn is sent there with Lóegaire and Conchobor, and in the later version also with Conall Cernach, to receive training from the warrior Domnall (whose hideous daughter falls in love with the hero and, after being spurned by him, later exacts her revenge by separating him from his companions by means of a magical illusion). After some time, Domnall assigns them to the care of Scáthach for further training.

Cú Chulainn and his companion Ferdiad travel to Dún Scáith, where Scáthach teaches them feats of arms, and gives Cú Chulainn a deadly spear, the Gáe Bulg. Cú Chulainn begins an affair with Scáthach's daughter Uathach, but accidentally breaks her fingers. She screams, calling her lover Cochar Croibhe to the room. Despite Uathach's protests, he challenges Cú Chulainn to a duel, and Cú Chulainn dispatches him easily. To make it up to Uathach and Scáthach, Cú Chulainn assumes Cochar's duties, and becomes Uathach's lover. Scáthach eventually promises her daughter to him, without requiring the traditional bride price. When her rival, the warrior woman Aífe, threatens her territory, Cú Chulainn battles Aífe, and manages to defeat her through distracting her with lies. With his sword at her throat, he bargains with her that he will spare her life under the conditions that she will cease her conflicts with Scáthach, and that she will allow him to impregnate her so that she will bear him a son. This leaves Aífe pregnant with his son Connla, whom Cú Chulainn kills years later — only realizing who Connla is after he has slain him.

== See also ==
- Cuillin on the Isle of Skye

== General sources ==
- MacKillop, James (1998). Dictionary of Celtic Mythology. London: Oxford. ISBN 0-19-860967-1.
- Tochmarc Emire (Recension I), ed. and tr. Kuno Meyer (1890). "The Oldest Version of Tochmarc Emire". Revue Celtique. 11: 433–57. CELT link. CELT
- Quin, E. G.; et al., eds. (2007) [1913–1975]. "Alpae". Dictionary of the Irish Language, Based Mainly on Old and Middle Irish Materials. Dublin: RIA. Letter A, Column 291.
- Tochmarc Emire (Recension II), ed. A. G. van Hamel, Compert Con Culainn and Other Stories. Mediaeval and Modern Irish Series 3. Dublin, 1933.
