= Láeg =

Companion of Cú Chulainn in Irish mythology

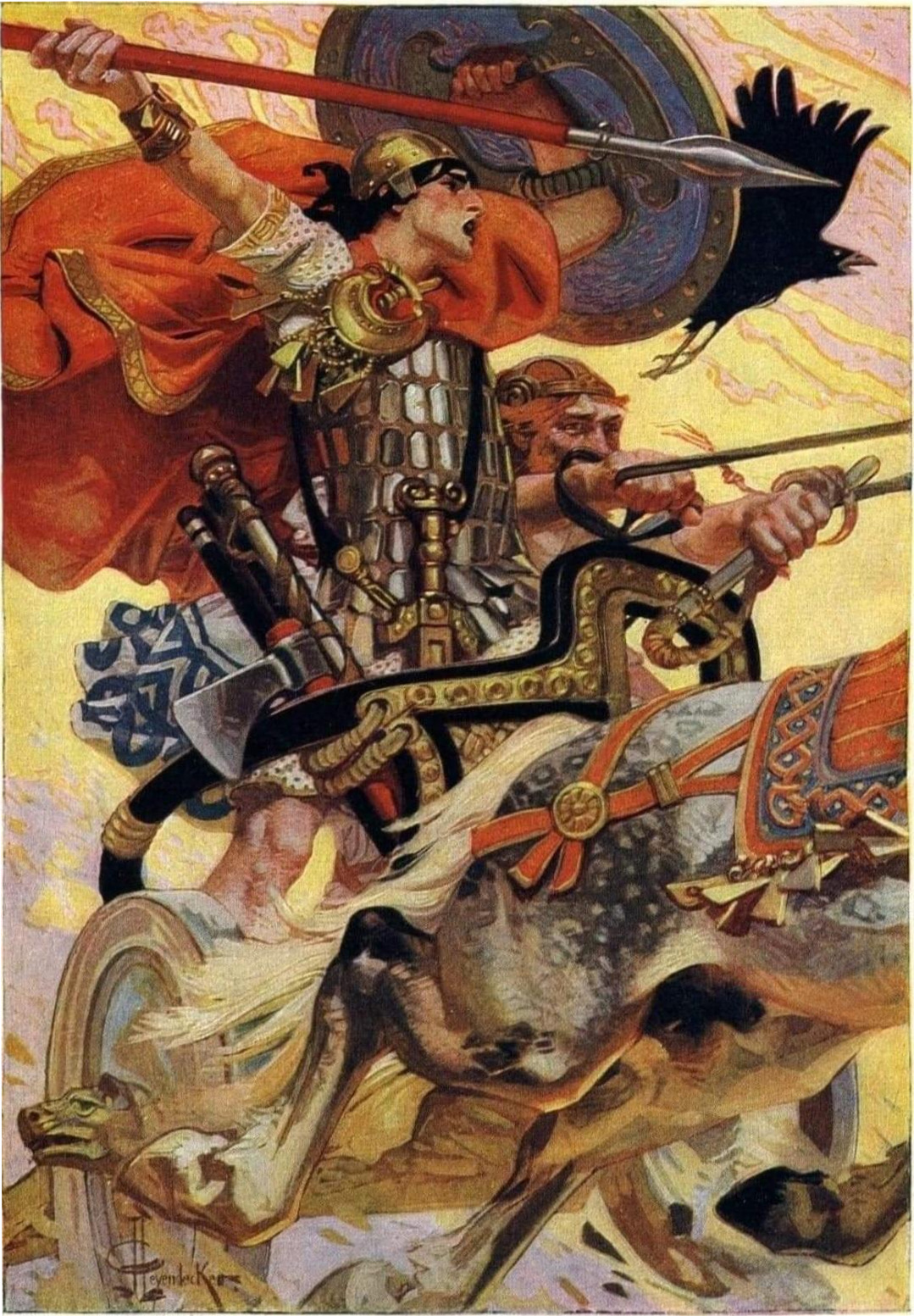
"Cuchulain in Battle", illustration by J. C. Leyendecker from T. W. Rolleston, Myths and Legends of the Celtic Race, 1911. Láeg is driving the chariot.

Láeg, or Lóeg, son of Riangabar, is the charioteer and constant companion of the hero Cú Chulainn in the Ulster Cycle of Irish mythology. His horses are Liath Macha and Dub Sainglend.

Cú Chulainn sends Láeg to the Otherworld with Lí Ban, sister to Fand, and he brings back bountiful descriptions of the Otherworld in the tale Serglige Con Culainn (The Sickbed of Cúchulainn). In the tale of Cú Chulainn's death, he is killed by Lugaid mac Con Roí with a spear intended for Cú Chulainn.
