= Stephen Reid (artist) =

British artist (1873–1948)

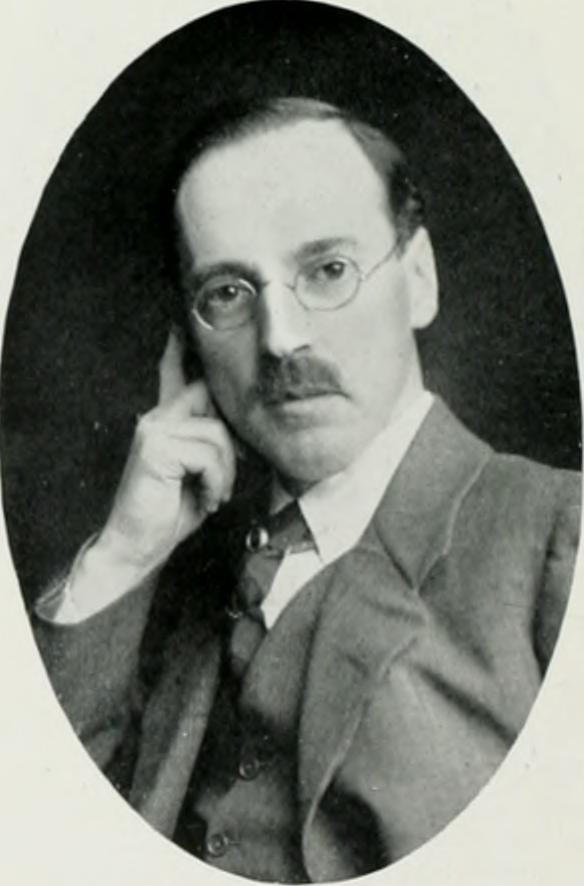
- Born: 30 May 1873; Aberdeen, Scotland
- Died: 7 December 1948 (aged 75); Hampstead, London, England
- Education: Gray's School of Art
- Alma mater: Royal Scottish Academy
- Occupations: Illustrator; painter

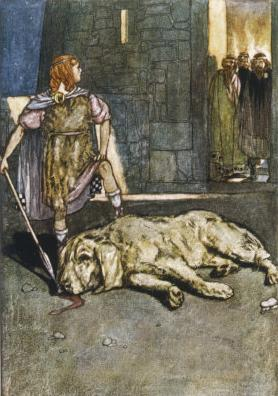
"Cuchulainn Slays the Hound of Culain", illustration from The Boy's Cuchulain by Eleanor Hull (1910)

Stephen Reid (30 May 1873 – 7 December 1948) was a Scottish illustrator and painter who specialised in Georgian settings and costume pieces.

Born in Aberdeen, he was educated Gray's School of Art and the Royal Scottish Academy. He was elected to the Royal Society of British Artists at the age of 33. His early work was influenced by Edwin Austin Abbey.

Books he illustrated include:

- Hull, Eleanor (1904), The Boys' Cúchullain
- Noyes, Alfred (1908), Magic Casement; An Anthology of Fairy Poetry
- Wood, Eric (1910), Famous Voyages of the Great Discoverers
- Rolleston, T. W. (1910), The High Deeds of Finn
- Rolleston, T. W. (1911), Myths & Legends of the Celtic Race
- Letts, W.M. and M.F.S. (1913), Helmet & Cowl

He also contributed to magazines, including The Strand Magazine and The Connoisseur.
