= Connla =

Character in Irish mythology

Connla or Conlaoch is a character in the Ulster Cycle of Irish mythology, the son of the Ulster champion Cú Chulainn and the Scottish warrior woman Aífe. He was raised alone by his mother in Scotland. He appears in the story Aided Óenfhir Aífe (The Tragic Death of Aífe's Only Son), a pre-tale to the great epic Táin Bó Cúailnge.

== Story ==
Connla was the son of Cú Chulainn and Aífe Ardgeimm, identified in this text as the sister of his teacher Scáthach. Leaving to return to Ireland, Cú Chulainn gives Aífe a token, a gold thumb-ring, telling her that when his son is old enough to wear it, he should be sent to Ireland. However, he imposes three geasa or prohibitions on him. Connla cannot turn back once he starts his journey, he must not refuse a challenge, and must never tell anyone his name.

Connla comes ashore at Tracht Eisi, where he practises his martial feats. The Ulaid, observing these, recognise his skill as a warrior, and Conchobar observes that any land which produces young boys of such skill must be home to warriors who would 'pound [the Ulaid] to dust'. They send Condere son of Echu to encounter him, and Condere asks Connla for his name and lineage, which he refuses to give. Condere then welcomes Connla, complimenting his skill as a warrior and inviting him to meet the Ulaid. But Connla only asks whether the Ulaid would like to fight him in single combat, or as a group, telling Condere that he is not worth fighting.

Condere returns to the Ulaid, and Conall Cernach goes out to meet Connla, saying, "The Ulaid will not be shamed while I am alive." Connla sends a sling shot into the air so powerfully that the sound of it knocks Conall off his feet, and then he quickly disarms him. Conall returns shamed to the rest of the Ulaid.

Cú Chulainn then approaches Connla, but Emer, his wife, warns him not to fight him because the boy is his own son, Connla, whose mother is Aífe. Cú Chulainn rebukes her, saying that heroic deeds "are not performed with a woman's assistance", and that for the sake of the Ulaid, he would fight any intruder no matter who they were. He asks Connla to identify himself, warning him that he will die if he does not, but Connla refuses. They wrestle in the water, with Connla gaining the upper hand, until Cú Chulainn resorts to the gae bolga, a weapon whose use Scáthach taught only to him, and Connla is fatally wounded.

Cú Chulainn carries Connla to the shore and identifies him to the Ulaid as his son. Connla greets each of the heroes of the Ulaid in turn before bidding his father farewell and dying. He is grieved, and a marker is raised for his grave, "and for three days not a calf of the cattle of the Ulaid was left alive after him".

== Versions and date ==
There are two versions of Aided Óenfhir Aífe. The earliest is a late Old Irish text, found in the Yellow Book of Lecan, which is the most well-known version and the source of the narrative above. It has been dated to the 9th or 10th century. There is also a later version in TCD 1336, appended with legal commentary about accountability and compensation.

Versions of the story also appear in the dinnsenchas of Lechtán Óenfhir Aífe, Geoffrey Keating's History of Ireland, and in an Early Modern Irish version, entitled Oidheadh Chonlaoich.

The tale of Connla shares many key aspects with stories from other traditions. In the Greek story of Theseus the hero is also born of an irregular union and raised by his mother in a far-off place. When of a similar stature to his unknown father he must take certain tokens left and set out to claim his birthright. He then combats with a series of opponents before meeting his father, Aegeus, and being recognised. A later unknowing father-son element in the story occurs when he returns from Crete, having killed the Minotaur, and the failure to reveal himself leads to the father's death. There are also strong similarities with the lost Greek epic poem the Telegony were father and son fight. In its surviving summary, found in the "Chrestomathy of Proclus", it is the unrecognised father rather than the son that is killed in combat. Telegonus, the son seeking his father, born of a woman in foreign lands (to the enchantress Circe), after travelling as a stranger to his paternal land, inadvertently fights and kills his father Odysseus. This he does with a lance tipped with the venomous spine of a stingray which could stand, as argued by Edward Petit, as the inspiration for the deadly Gáe Bulg of Cú Chulainn made from the bone of a sea monster, the Curruid. Again there is a scene as Odysseus lies dying, when he and Telegonus recognize one another, and in this case the son Telegonus laments his mistake.

The story also closely resembles the tenth-century tale of Rostam and Sohrab from the Iranian epic the Shahnameh; with an unknowing father-son in a closely matched wrestling duel in which the son is killed, a jewel token-memento and in some versions the use of a poisoned weapon as option of last resort. This in turn probably derives from the story of Babhruvahana, son of Arjuna, in the Mahabharata part of the Indic epic tradition, with an unknowing father-son duel, a jewel-memento, the use of a divine weapon, the Pashupatastra, which cannot be resisted and is not to be used against lesser enemies, and particular to these two stories a following-a-horse element.

== In literature ==
The story of Connla's death by his father's hand is related in the W. B. Yeats poem "Cuchulain's Fight with the Sea," first published in 1892. The poetic retelling differs in several respects from the original myth, including portraying Connla as the son of Emer and not Aífe.
