= Aífe =

Character from the Ulster Cycle of Irish mythology

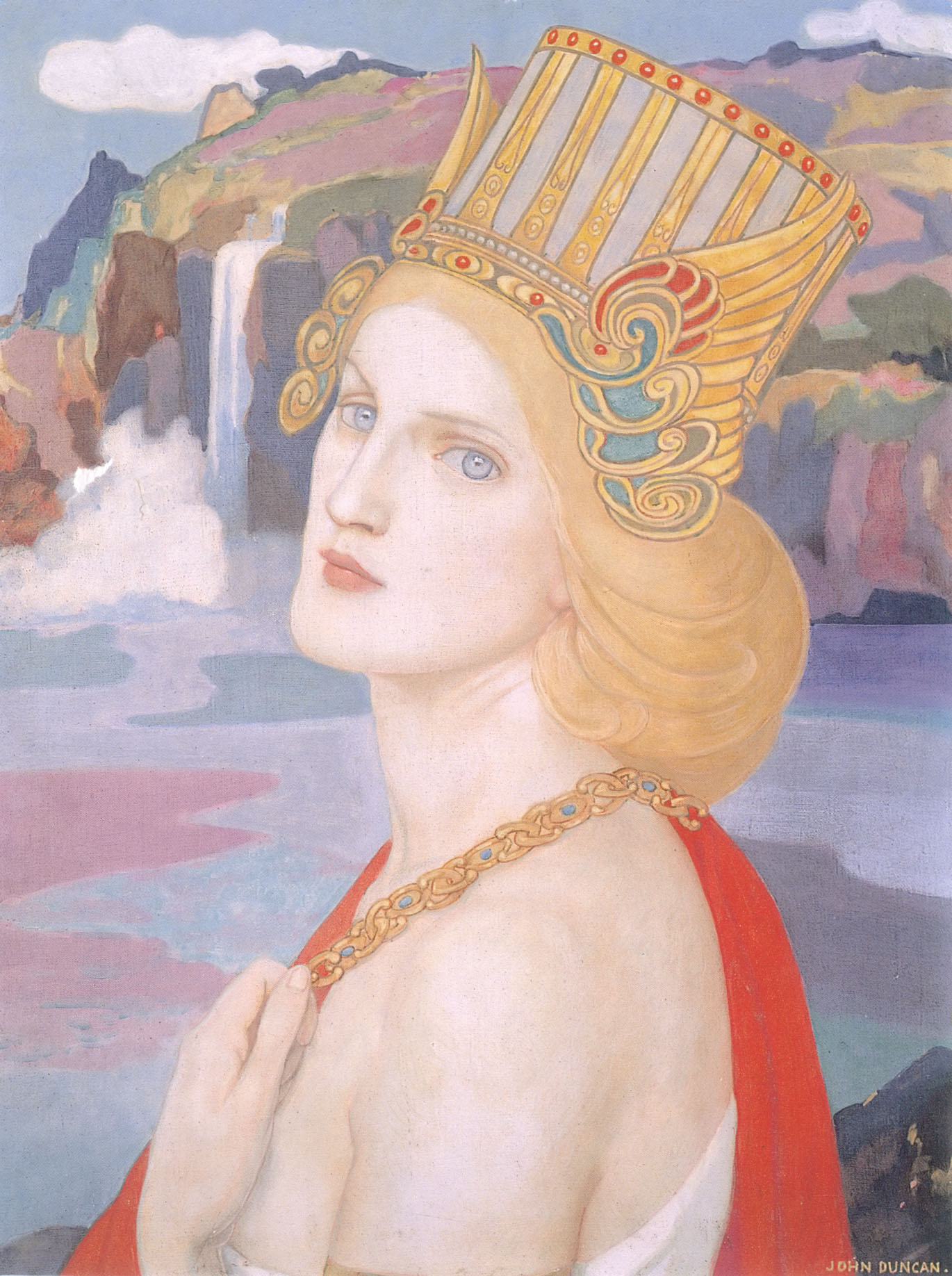
Painting of Aoife by John Duncan

Aífe (Old Irish), spelled Aoife (IPA: [ˈiːfʲə]) in Modern Irish and Scots Gaelic, is a character from the Ulster Cycle of Irish mythology. She appears in the sagas Tochmarc Emire ("the wooing of Emer") and Aided Óenfhir Aífe ("the death of Aífe's only son"). In Tochmarc Emire she lives east of a land called Alpi, usually understood to mean Alba (Scotland), where she is at war with a rival woman warrior, Scáthach. In Aided Óenfhir Aífe she lives in Letha (the Armorican peninsula), and is Scáthach's sister as well as rival – they are both daughters of Árd-Greimne of Lethra.

== Appearances ==
In Tochmarc Emire the Ulaid hero Cú Chulainn has come to train in arms under Scáthach on the Isle of Skye, when a battle breaks against Aífe. Scáthach, fearful of Cú Chulainn's safety, gives him a sleeping potion to keep him from the battle, but a potion that would put most people to sleep for twenty-four hours only knocks him out for an hour, and he joins the fray. Aífe challenges Scáthach to single combat, and Cú Chulainn fights as Scáthach's champion, but before the fight he asks Scáthach what it is that Aífe loves most, which Scáthach reveals is her chariot and horses. They begin to fight, and Aífe shatters Cú Chulainn's sword, at which he cries out that Aífe's chariot and horses have fallen over a cliff. When Aífe turns to look, he overpowers her, throws her over his shoulder, and carries her back to his side. He held his sword at her throat as she begged for her life. He chooses not to kill her, on two conditions: that she cease hostilities with Scáthach and she bear him a son.

When Cú Chulainn returns to Ireland he leaves Aífe pregnant. He gives her a gold ring to give to the child, and instructs her that when he is seven he is to come to Ireland in search of him, but he must not identify himself to anyone. The story is taken up again in Aided Óenfhir Aífe, when the boy, Connla by name, comes to Ireland as Cú Chulainn had instructed, and his precocious prowess alarms the Ulaid. Because he will not identify himself, Cú Chulainn fights and kills him. When it was too late Cú Chulainn recognised the ring; he had killed his only son.

== Biblical rendering ==
The name is unrelated to the Biblical name Eva, which was rendered as Éabha in Irish, but due to the similarity in sound, Aife has often been incorrectly anglicised as Eva or Eve. Aoife MacMurrough (also known as Eva of Leinster) was a 12th-century Irish noblewoman.
