= Gáe Bulg =

Spear of Cúchulainn in the Ulster Cycle of Irish mythology

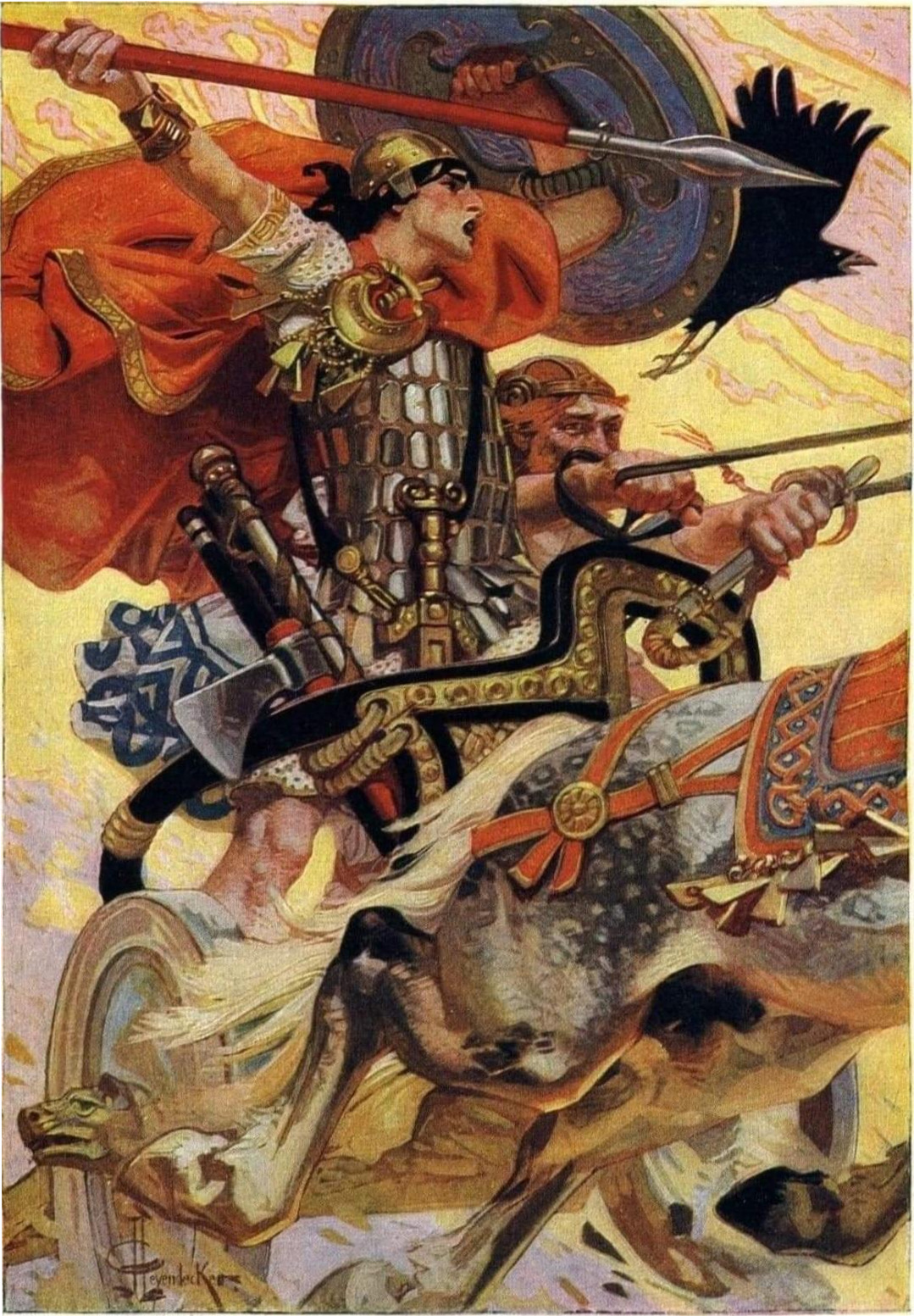
Cú Chulainn fighting with a spear, as depicted by J. C. Leyendecker

The Gáe Bulg (Old Irish pronunciation: [ɡaːi̯ ˈbulg]) (also Gáe Bulga, Gáe Bolg, Gáe Bolga), meaning "spear of mortal pain/death", "gapped/notched spear", or "belly spear", was the name of the spear of Cú Chulainn in the Ulster Cycle of Irish mythology. It was given to him by his martial arts teacher, the warrior woman Scáthach, and its technique was taught only to him.

It was made from the bone of a sea monster, the Curruid, that had died while fighting another sea monster, the Coinchenn. Although some sources make it out to be simply a particularly deadly spear, others—notably the Book of Leinster—state that it could only be used under very specialized, ritual conditions:

The Gáe Bulg had to be made ready for use on a stream and cast from the fork of the toes. It entered a man's body with a single wound, like a javelin, then opened into thirty barbs. Only by cutting away the flesh could it be taken from that man's body.

In other versions of the legend, the spear had seven heads, each with seven barbs. In the Táin Bó Cuailnge, Cú Chulainn received the spear after training with the great warrior mistress Scáthach in Alba. She taught him and his foster-brother, Ferdiad, everything the same, except she taught the Gáe Bulg feat only to Cuchulainn. He later used it in single combat against Ferdiad. They were fighting in a ford, and Ferdiad had the upper hand; Cúchulainn's charioteer, Láeg, floated the Gáe Bulg down the stream to his master, who cast it into Ferdiad's body, piercing the warrior's armor and "coursing through the highways and byways of his body so that every single joint filled with barbs." Ferdiad died soon after. On a separate occasion, Cúchulainn also killed his own son, Connla, with the spear. In both instances, it was used as a last resort, as once thrown it proved invariably fatal.

Cúchulainn's use of the Gáe Bulg in the Táin Bó Cuailnge exemplifies its deadliness and the gruesome condition in which it leaves its victims. This can be seen in the fact that after it is used, one must literally cut into the victim to retrieve it. This was the case in Cúchulainn's slaying of Ferdiad. As it is stated in Ciaran Carson's translation of The Táin:

Láeg came forward and cut Fer Diad open and took out the Gáe Bolga. Cú Chulainn saw his weapon bloody and crimson from Fer Diad's body...

== Etymology ==
Traditionally, the name has been translated as "belly spear", with the second element of the name, bulga, being treated as a derivative of Old Irish bolg "belly, sack, bag".

Several notable Celtic scholars, including Joseph Loth and Kuno Meyer, have preferred to derive it rather from Old Irish bolc "gap, breach, notch" (cognate with Welsh bwlch), suggesting a linguistic link with the second element in the name of Fergus mac Róich's sword, Caladbolg and King Arthur's sword Caledfwlch.

Linguist Eric Hamp derives the second element, bulga, from a Proto-Celtic compound *balu-gaisos meaning "spear of mortal pain/death spear" (comparable to Old Irish fogha "spear, dart", from Proto-Celtic *uo-gaisu-). Once the second element *gaisos "spear" was no longer recognizable to Irish speakers, its Old Irish cognate, gáe, was reattached to the beginning for clarification, forming a new, tautological compound.

== See also ==
- Gungnir, Odin's spear in Nordic legend
- Spear of Lugh, also in Irish myth
- Mythological weapons, for a list
