= Aided Con Culainn =

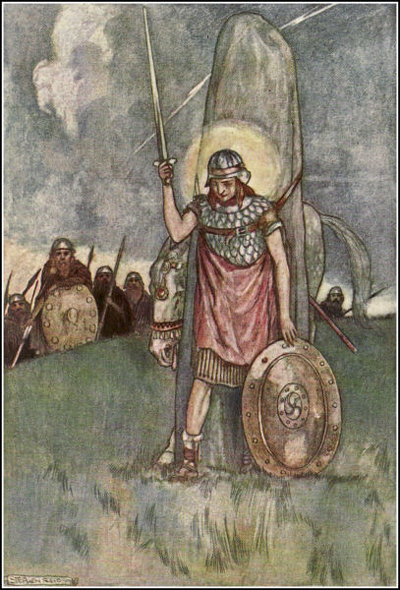
"Cuchulain comes at last to his death", an illustration by Stephen Reid in The Boys' Cuchulain (1904)

Aided Chon Culainn ('the violent death of Cú Chulainn'), also known as Brislech Mór Maige Murthemne ('the great rout at the plain of Murthemne'), found in the twelfth-century Book of Leinster (folios 77 a 1 to 78 b 2), is a story of how the Irish hero Cú Chulainn dies in battle.

== Summary ==
Medb conspires with Lugaid, son of Cú Roí, Erc, son of Cairbre Nia Fer, and the sons of others Cú Chulainn had killed, to draw him out to his death. Cú Chulainn's fate is sealed by his breaking of the geasa (taboos) upon him. Cú Chulainn's geasa included a ban against eating dog meat, but in early Ireland there was a powerful general taboo against refusing hospitality, so when an old crone offers him a meal of dog meat, he has no choice but to break his geis. In this way he is spiritually weakened for the fight ahead of him. Lugaid has three magical spears made, and it is prophesied that a king will fall by each of them. Fighting on the plain of Mag Muirthemne (now in County Louth), he kills Cú Chulainn's charioteer Láeg, king of chariot drivers, with the first spear. With the second he kills Cú Chulainn's horse, Liath Macha, king of horses. With the third he hits Cú Chulainn, mortally wounding him. Cú Chulainn ties himself to a standing stone to die on his feet, facing his enemies. Due to his ferocity even when so near death, it is only when a raven lands on Cú Chulainn's shoulder that his enemies believe he is dead. Lugaid approaches and cuts off his head, but as he does so the "hero-light" burns around Cú Chulainn and his sword falls from his hand and cuts Lugaid's hand off. The light disappears only after his right hand, his sword arm, is cut from his body.

Conall Cernach had sworn that if Cú Chulainn died before him he would avenge him before sunset, and when he hears Cú Chulainn is dead he pursues Lugaid. As Lugaid has lost a hand, Conall fights him with one hand tucked into his belt, but he only beats him after his horse takes a bite out of Lugaid's side. He also kills Erc, and takes his head back to Tara, where Erc's sister Achall dies of grief for her brother.

== Editions and translations ==
- Whitley Stokes (ed. and trans.), 'Cuchulainn's Death, Abridged from the Book of Leinster', Revue Celtique, 3 (1877), 175–185
- T. P. Cross and C. H. Slover (trans.), Ancient Irish Tales (New York, 1936, 1969), pp. 333–40
- Eleanor Hull, The Cuchullin Saga (London, 1898)
- Tymoczko, Maria (trans.), Two Death Tales from the Ulster Cycle: The Death of Cu Roi and The Death of Cu Chulainn, Dolmen Texts, 2 (Dublin: Dolmen Press, 1981), ISBN 978-0851053424
- 'Aided Con Culainn', in Compert Con Culainn and Other Stories, ed. by A. G. Van Hamel, Medieval and Modern Irish Series, 3 (Dublin: Stationery Office, 1933), pp. 69–133
