= Beheading game =

Motif of medieval romance

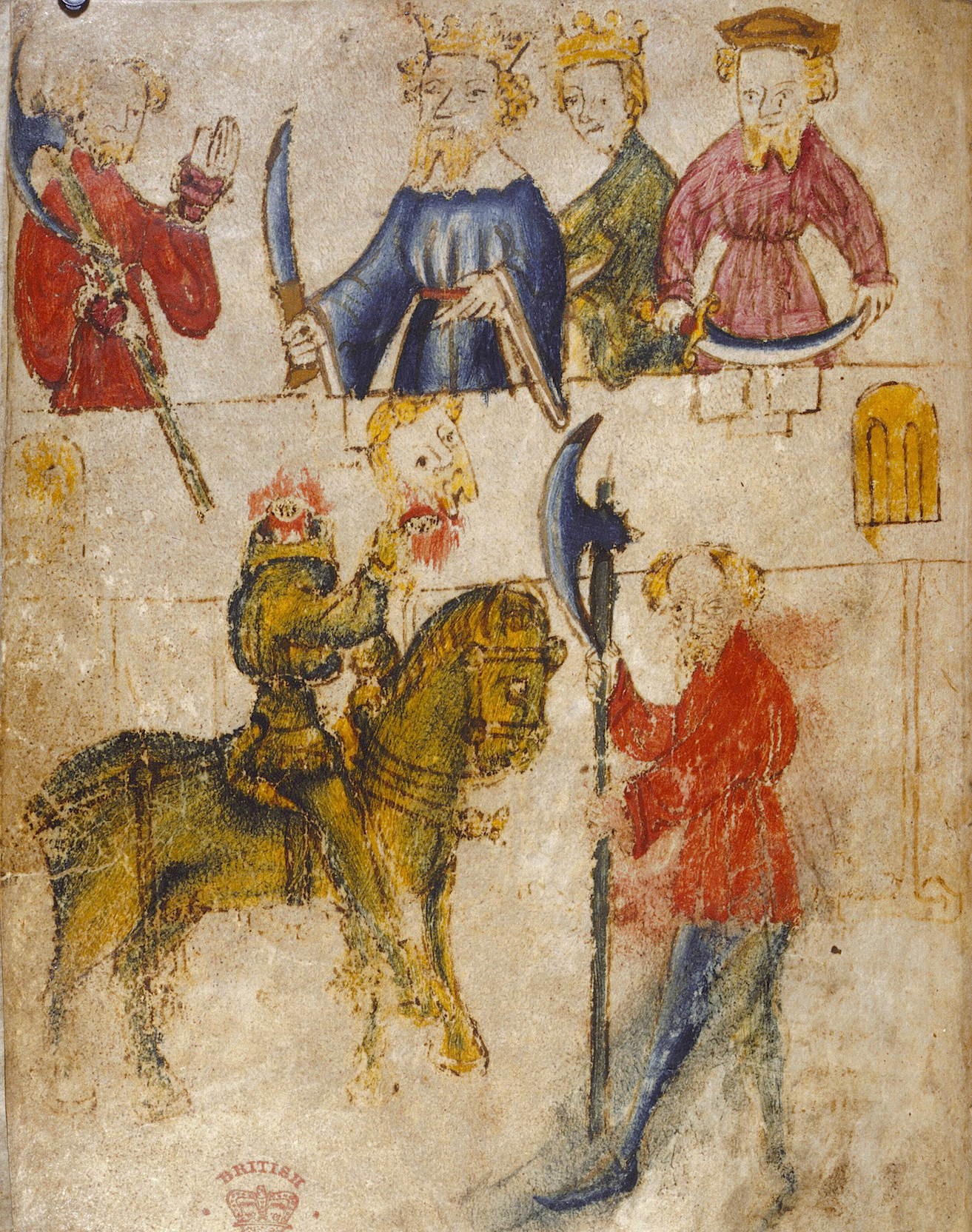
The Green Knight has survived beheading by Gawain and carries his own head in this 14th-century manuscript.

The beheading game is a literary trope found in Irish mythology and medieval chivalric romance. The trope consists of a stranger who arrives at a royal court and challenges a hero to an exchange of blows: the hero may decapitate the stranger, but the stranger may then inflict the same wound upon the hero. The supernatural nature of the stranger, which makes this possible, is only revealed when he retrieves his severed head. When the hero submits himself to the return blow, he is rewarded for his valour and is left with only a minor wound. The hero is seen as coming of age by undergoing the exchange of blows, and his symbolic death and rebirth is represented by the feigned return blow.

Originating in the Irish legend of the Fled Bricrenn, the beheading game appears in several Arthurian romances, most notably Sir Gawain and the Green Knight. The version of the game found in the latter work has been analyzed for its relationship with the Arthurian concept of chivalry. At no point does the Green Knight specify that he must be beheaded, only that he will return whatever blow is struck. When Gawain makes the impulsive decision to decapitate the Knight, the values of Camelot require that he subject himself to death in the name of upholding the rules of the challenge. Gawain is incapable of bravely submitting to death, instead concealing a magic girdle that he believes will keep him from harm, thus demonstrating that he values survival over honour.

== Description and history ==
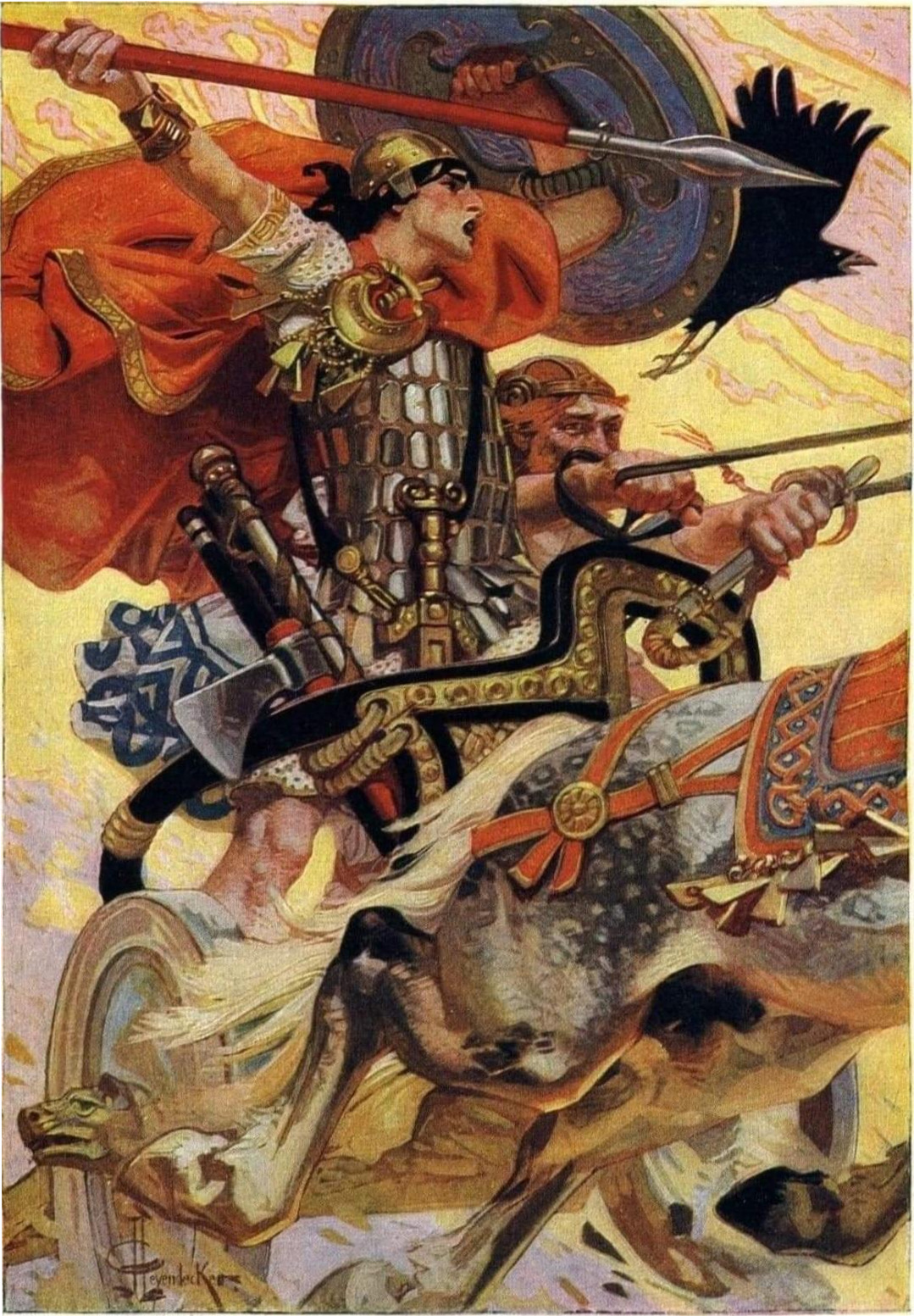
In the Fled Bricrenn, Cú Chulainn (pictured) takes part in a beheading game to earn the Champion's Portion.

The trope of the beheading game appears in 11 recorded works of medieval literature. Of these, two are Irish, four French, two German, and three English. The trope is believed to have originated in Irish mythology, the mythic cycles of which were subsequently adapted into 12th-century French chivalric romance. From there, the trope was introduced in 13th-century German and 14th-century English poetry. The beheading game itself is adapted from the motif of the Exchange of Blows, in which a stranger propositions a hero with a challenge: the hero may strike a blow upon the stranger, but they agree to have that same blow returned to them the following day. The unwritten folkloric origins of the trope remain unknown, but some philological scholars speculate that the Exchange of Blows derives from an ancient myth in which Summer and Winter do battle at the change of seasons.

In its most basic form, the beheading tale concerns the appearance of a mysterious, possibly supernatural figure who appears at a royal court and proposes a challenge for the members of said court: they may attempt to behead the stranger with an axe, but in doing so, the volunteer agrees to be beheaded at a later point in time. The hero who volunteers to take part in this challenge successfully beheads the stranger, who then retrieves his severed head and departs. After the hero spends the resultant waiting period mentally preparing himself for the retributory blow, the stranger returns and either feigns the blow entirely or leaves only a small wound on the hero's neck. The champion is congratulated for succeeding in the true challenge, which is to honour the parameters of the game by submitting himself to certain death. Sometimes the beheading game is expanded into a disenchantment narrative, as in Sir Gawain and the Carle of Carlisle and The Turke and Sir Gawain. In tales such as this, after the initial exchange, the stranger asks the hero to behead him once more, which then frees the challenger of whatever curse has made him monstrous.

=== Celtic mythology ===
The earliest recorded incidence of the trope of the beheading game is in the Fled Bricrenn (Bricriu's Feast), part of the Ulster Cycle of Irish mythology. The overarching plot of the Fled Bricrenn involves three heroes – Cú Chulainn, Conall Cernach, and Lóegaire Búadach – who are each independently told by the titular character that they are worthy of the Champion's Portion and are invited to a feast in their honour. When the three men arrive at Bricriu's Feast, they are put through a series of trials, often involving supernatural figures, to determine which among them is superior. Some written versions of the Fled Bricrenn involve two iterations of the beheading game. One, titled "The Champion's Bargain", dates back to at least the ninth century; the other, known as the "Uath" episode, is probably a later interpolation from when the manuscript was compiled in the eleventh century, but may nonetheless represent an earlier version of the story.

The "Uath" or "Terror" episode contains one of the first trials presented to the three heroes. A man named Uath challenges Cú Chulainn and the others to behead him with an axe, but warns them that they will be beheaded in turn the following day. Consistent with the other episodes of the Fled Bricrenn, which posit Cú Chulainn as the superior warrior, he is the only one to take up Uath's challenge. When he presents himself for the return blow, Uath spares Cú Chulainn by striking him with the blunt edge of the axe. The beheading game is repeated at the end of the Fled Bricrenn, in the episode titled "The Champion's Bargain". There, a strange churl arrives at the court of Conchobar mac Nessa, the king of Ulster, and challenges its members to a beheading game. Three heroes accept the churl's challenge but flee before the blow can be returned; only Cú Chulainn submits himself to the axe. For his valor, the churl, revealed to be the trickster king Cú Roí in disguise, declares that Cú Chulainn deserves the Champion's Portion.

=== Arthurian romance ===
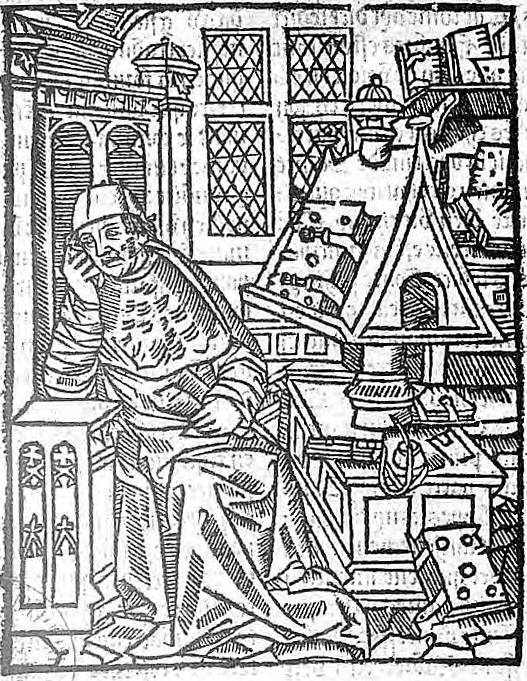
Chrétien de Troyes was the first to incorporate the beheading game into the Matter of Britain.

There are at least seven accounts of the beheading game in Arthurian romance, all of which are believed to derive from the Fled Bricrenn. All of these adaptations take one major deviation from the source, however: while the Irish myth involves three rivals, Arthurian beheading game narratives involve a singular hero. The first work of Arthurian literature to involve the beheading game is Chrétien de Troyes's unfinished Perceval, the Story of the Grail. In the poem, Caradoc, a young Knight of the Round Table, is tricked into participating in a beheading game by his sorcerous father, who arrives at King Arthur's court in disguise. He returns one year after the original decapitation to strike his son with the flat of his sword and praise him for his bravery. While Caradoc's narrative added more details to the game than were found in the Fled Bricrenn, the basic plot structure remains the same, as the test of loyalty and bravery inherent in the original work translated capably to the conventions of chivalric romance. For this reason, the structure of the original Irish myth remains mostly intact in the French romances such as La Mule sans frein, Hunbaut, and Perlesvaus. Besides the singularity of Caradoc's adventure, the one other change taken from the Irish is that, while Cú Chulainn's trial was the culmination of his life of adventure, for Caradoc, the beheading game is his initiation into the world of errantry.

Throughout Arthuriana, multiple knights are subjected to some iteration of the beheading game. In Perlesvaus, it is Lancelot who subjects himself to the game during his quest for the Holy Grail. In accordance with the rest of the text, his encounter with the stranger is viewed as an analogy for Christian sacrifice. In returning to the site of the original beheading and offering himself as a sacrifice, Lancelot brings life to the ruined city, just as the sacrifice of Jesus was meant to save humanity from destruction. In Sir Thomas Malory's Le Morte d'Arthur, meanwhile, Gareth undergoes in his chapter a number of trials which he must overcome in order to learn the merits and responsibilities of knighthood. One of these trials involves Lynette and Lyonesse, two noblewomen from afar who come to Camelot asking for aid against four villains who are assailing them. Beset by his lust for Lyonesse, Gareth decides that he will consummate their relationship once all of these enemies have been defeated. To prevent this fornication from occurring, Lynette magically re-attaches the Red Knight's severed head so that there is always an enemy to defeat. After repeatedly beheading the Red Knight, Gareth decides that the noblest option is to spare his enemy's life, leaving the task incomplete and preserving his chastity.

The Arthurian knight most often subjected to the beheading game is Arthur's nephew Gawain, the hero of both La Mule sans frein and the Hunbaut. In the former, the beheading game is only one of several trials which Gawain must endure in order to return a mule's magical bridle to its owner. Partway through his quest for the bridle and amidst a forest filled with malevolent wild animals, a churl allows Gawain to spend the night in his castle as long as he agrees to a beheading game. By submitting himself to the return blow, Gawain is spared and returns to his quest. Hunbaut, meanwhile, features a subversion of the beheading game: Gawain agrees to deliver the first blow, after which he catches his opponent's severed head. By preventing the challenger from reuniting his head and body, Gawain spares himself the return blow.

Perhaps the best-known and most developed iteration of the beheading game in medieval romance, however, is the late 14th century poem Sir Gawain and the Green Knight. The anonymous Gawain-poet combines the beheading game with another type of exchange, the temptation. In the poem, the Green Knight arrives at Camelot on New Year's Day to propose a beheading game, with the volunteer asked to find the knight in the Green Chapel one year hence. While on his way to the chapel, Gawain encounters the Bertilaks, who propose an exchange of winnings: Gawain may explore their castle while Lord Bertilak hunts, and at the end of the day, they exchange whatever they have acquired. When Lady Bertilak attempts to seduce Gawain, he reveals the kisses that she gave him to Lord Bertilak, but he does not disclose that she also provided him a magical girdle designed to keep the wearer from harm. When Gawain arrives at the chapel, the Green Knight, revealed to be Lord Bertilak in disguise, feigns the beheading blow twice, and on the third swing, he leaves a small wound on Gawain's neck as punishment for his dishonesty about the girdle. Upon his return to Camelot, Gawain, ashamed of his cowardice, decides to continue wearing the girdle as a badge of shame.

== Literary analysis ==
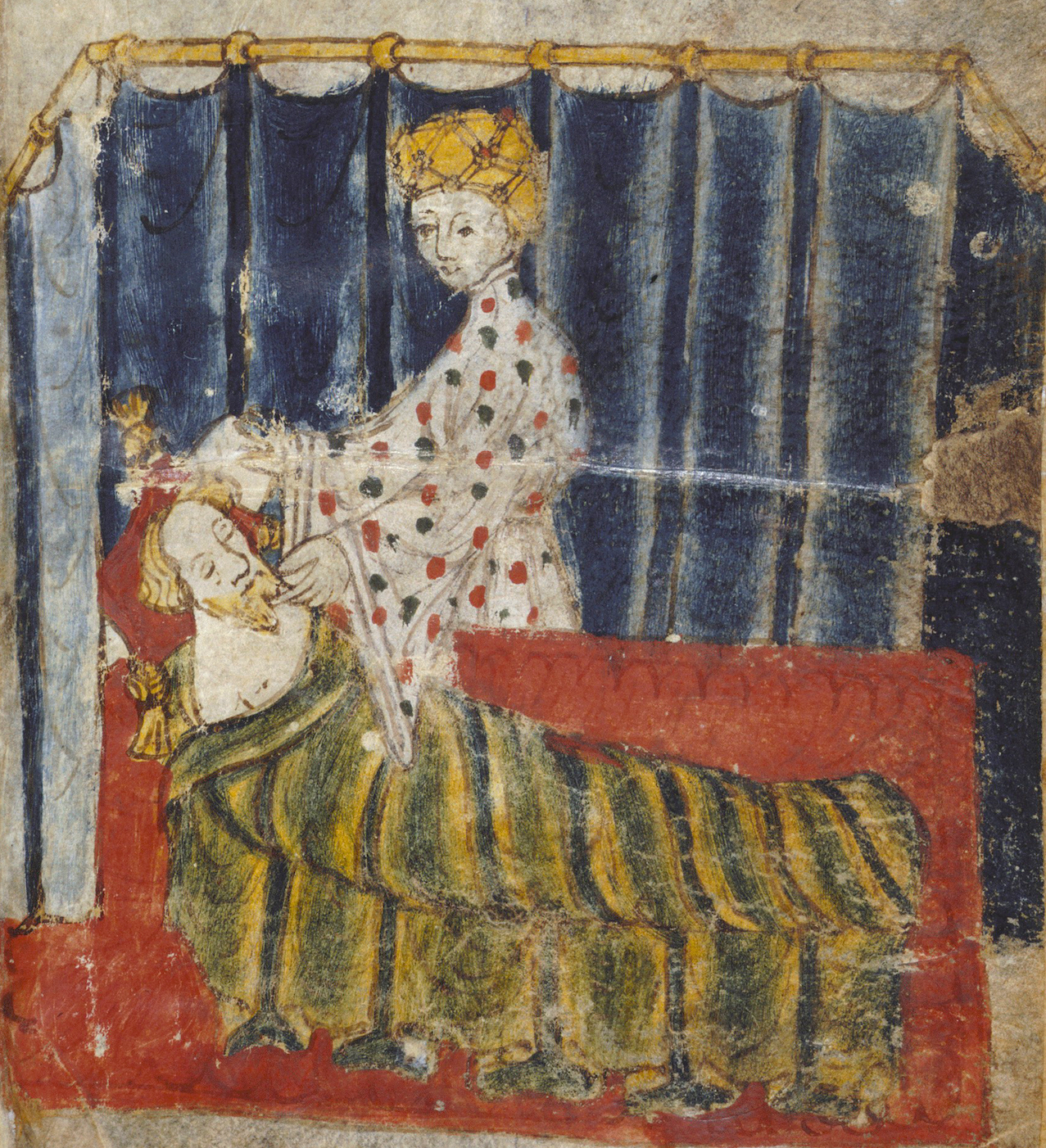
By taking the magic girdle from Lady Bertilak, Gawain fails to uphold the virtues of Camelot.

In both Celtic mythology and Arthurian romance, the head—and more specifically, the taking of a head—was a central mechanism by which a hero could pass from adolescence into adulthood. This was possible either by decapitating an opponent, in which one could cement their status as a warrior, or by subjecting oneself to death through possible decapitation in a beheading game. As a result, most literary scholars analysing this motif have viewed the beheading game as a coming of age metaphor. By subjecting themselves both to the possibility of death as well as a feigned fatal blow, heroes such as Cú Chúlainn and Gawain experience a symbolic death which allows them to be spiritually reborn as better men and warriors. Even more symbolically, the threat of death by decapitation can be seen as a metaphor for circumcision. While the hero is initially threatened with a complete removal of the head, a type of castration, he is ultimately left with only a small wound, akin to the removal of the foreskin. The Bildungsroman aspects of the beheading game are particularly salient in Perceval and in Sir Gawain and the Green Knight. In the former, Caradoc's first trial as a Knight of the Round Table involves his father's game, which serves as an introduction to his future errantry. In the latter, rather than returning to Camelot, the Green Knight demands that Gawain embark on a quest to the Green Chapel, and the road of trials allows the hero to develop physically, emotionally, and spiritually.

The other central theme of the beheading game is that of cultural values. At the end of the narrative, the hero is spared and the blow only feigned, because he fulfilled the contract that was established at the beginning of the game. In this context, some scholars have seen the Gawain-poet as using Gawain's girdle to criticize the emptiness of the Arthurian concept of chivalry. When the Green Knight first arrives at Camelot, he speaks of the honourable reputation that Arthur's knights possess, and proposes the game as a means of testing the merits of that reputation. While Arthurian chivalry emphasises the honourable nature of a sacrificial death, Gawain's decision to behead the Green Knight, which then requires him to fulfill the other side of the contract, is far more foolish than admirable. For Laura Ashe, an English professor at Worcester College, Oxford, the idea that Gawain must travel to the Green Chapel to uphold the chivalric ideals of Camelot, even knowing that it would bring death, demonstrates the foolishness of ideals that preserve honour over life. Additionally, Gawain is criticized for his decision to use the magic girdle that will supposedly preserve his life, demonstrating that he has deemed his life more important than the concepts of honour he is meant to uphold. Literary critic Piero Boitani notes that Gawain is initially presented to the reader as "the perfect representative of the virtues which that society has elevated to principles of life", making his failure to uphold those values at the end of the narrative that much more disturbing.

Analyses of Gawain's failure to complete the quest tend to focus on his concealment of the girdle. Other scholars have noted, however, that Gawain's failure begins simply with his response to the challenge. Unlike other iterations of the beheading game, the Green Knight does not specify that he must be decapitated, only that whatever blow is done to him will be returned. Victoria L. Weiss of Lehigh University describes the initial beheading scene as "Gawain's first failure", criticizing the hero for making the impulsive decision to strike a fatal blow when at no point did the challenger specify that the game required a beheading. Ashe suggests that the holly branch the Green Knight carries in his other hand was a test, and that he wished for a clever knight to strike him with the branch rather than the axe.

The tone of the beheading game becomes darker with adaptation, and the magical elements are altered. In Malory, for instance, severed heads do not speak, creating an air of finality in the action that is only subverted when the challenger reattaches his head. This is mostly due to the differing connotations around beheading in Celtic and medieval English culture. For instance, the Celts believed that decapitation was an honourable form of execution for a foe who had fought valiantly, while for the English, beheading was a punishment reserved for traitors. The magical nature of the head as the container of human power is also not present in the medieval English as it is in Celtic belief, making the Green Knight a sort of pagan figure in a Christian world where death, particularly decapitation, is final. Elizabeth Scala, a medievalist with the University of Texas at Austin, has used this different tone to explain why Gawain makes the decision to behead the Green Knight. Whereas an Irish hero like Cú Chúlainn has enough experience with the supernatural to believe that his opponent will survive what should have been a fatal blow, Gawain has no reason to believe such a thing, and he is not faced with the gravity of his decision until the Green Knight retrieves his severed head.

== Game studies ==
The actions and motivations of the players in the beheading game motif have lent themselves to study not just in the realm of literary theory, but also of game studies. Game studies relating to medieval literature frequently invoke the paradigm created by the Dutch historian Johan Huizinga, whose 1938 Homo Ludens created a paradigm for understanding the functions of games and play across culture. Luden's paradigm would place the beheading game within archaic culture, in which violent single combat was co-opted into recreation. As society progressed into the medieval, this more archaic form of violent sport remained integrated into game culture through tournaments. In addition to a type of tournament, the beheading game might be seen as a game of dares, in which the hero's reputation is dependent on his ability to answer a challenge.

Both the medieval tournament and the game of dares require that the challenge be proposed without ulterior motive. This is not present in the beheading game, in which the challenger's supernatural abilities allow him to deceive the hero, and his motivation goes beyond simple sport. Additionally, an effective dare requires a symmetry of consequence: if the challenger were to complete the dare himself, the stakes must be as high as they are for his target. This symmetry is complicated by the beheading game: on the one hand, the challenger's ability to survive his own decapitation proves an unfair advantage over a hero who has no such magic; on the other, the challenger must survive the first blow if he is to deliver its return.

By disguising both his supernatural abilities and his true motivations, the challenger exploits the differences Huizinga elucidates between play, a simple form of recreation which is devoid of real-world consequence, and game, which has a designated structure and purpose. For the challenger, who is aware that no harm will come to either party, the beheading game remains within the realm of play, but for the hero and the bystanders, the game is something more sinister. The beheading game can thus be seen as a godgame, in which a godlike game-maker designs a contest that appears unwinnable for their pawn, with the intention of awakening the hero to a greater truth of the universe. In the case of Sir Gawain and the Green Knight, the lesson to be learned is that chivalry, with its insistence on following every rule which one is prescribed, is folly. To teach Gawain and the reader this lesson, the Gawain-poet and the Bertilaks place him in a double bind where, no matter what, a game rule must be broken: if he forfeits his magic girdle to Bertilak, Gawain will "lose" the beheading game through death, but if he conceals the girdle, he will lose the exchange of winnings.

== Other iterations ==
The beheading game has found its way into contemporary culture by means of direct adaptations of the myths from which it originates. W. B. Yeats, for instance, adapted Cú Chulainn's experience into a play first titled The Golden Helmet and later rewritten in 1910 as The Green Helmet. In Yeats's iteration, the Red Man returns the year after he is beheaded to demand a head of his own, and Cú Chulainn bravely offers his own head in sacrifice. The story of Sir Gawain and the Green Knight, meanwhile, has been adapted several times, most recently in David Lowery's 2021 film The Green Knight, which stars Dev Patel as Gawain and Ralph Ineson as the Green Knight.

Outside of Britain and Ireland, the closest analogue for the beheading game is found in the Icelandic Sveins rímur Múkssonar, in which an ogre named the Grey Carle appears at the court of the King of the Greeks and challenges its members, one by one, to a beheading game. The hero Sveinn is the first to oblige, successfully decapitating the Carle, but the Ogre retrieves and reattaches his severed head, informing Sveinn that he will return the next day to incur the same blow. It is believed that the stories of the Fled Bricrenn came to Iceland through an intermediary English work that has since been lost. This exchange of mythologies also occurred in the reverse direction: The Turke and Sir Gawain is an adaptation of the Icelandic Þorsteins saga Víkingssonar, albeit with an added beheading game. In both narratives, the hero accompanies an otherworldly stranger to a distant land, where both gain magical gifts, including invisibility, by which they can defeat an enemy. The Turke adds, however, an episode in which Gawain must decapitate his companion in order to lift the Turke's curse, an element not found in the original.

== See also ==
- Saint symbology
- Dullahan
- Headless Rider urban legend
- Cephalophore – a saint who is generally depicted carrying their severed head
- Chhinnamasta – a Hindu goddess holding her own severed head
- Decapitation – Complete separation of the head from the body
- Headhunting – Practice of hunting a human and collecting the severed head after killing the victim
- Headless priest
- Shrunken head
- With Her Head Tucked Underneath Her Arm
