= The Tale of Mac Da Thó's Pig =

Legendary Irish tale

Scéla Muicce Meicc Da Thó
- "The Tale of Mac Da Thó's Pig"
- Author(s): Unknown Leinster author
- Manuscript(s): Book of Leinster (Trinity College, Dublin), H.3.18 (Trinity College, Dublin), Harley 5280 (British Library), Bodleian Library, MS Rawlinson B 512, MS. XXXVI (National Library of Scotland), H.6.8 (Trinity College, Dublin)
- Genre: prose narrative of the Ulster Cycle and Cycles of the Kings; elements of self-parody
- Subject: Provincial rivalry; heroic communal feasting
- Setting: Mac Da Thó's Hostel, County Carlow, and surrounding Leinster countryside
- Personages: protagonists: Mac Da Thó, king of Leinster; Cet mac Mágach; Conall Cernach; Conchobar, king of Ulster; Fer Loga, charioteer of Ailill

The Tale of Mac Da Thó's Pig (Old Irish: Scéla Muicce Meicc Da Thó) is a legendary tale in the Ulster Cycle.

The story tells of a dispute between the Connachta, led by Ailill and Medb, and the Ulaid, led by Conchobar mac Nessa, over the acquisition of the hound of Leinster, Ailbe. The dispute is ultimately resolved through the plan of the king of Leinster, Mac Da Thó, to hold a feast at his hostel, at which a fight breaks out over the assignment of the curadmír or champion's portion.

The work is an example of early Irish literature, written primarily in prose attributed to an unknown author of Leinster c. AD 800, and survives in at least six manuscripts, written between the 12th and 18th centuries. The story was apparently popular in the Middle Ages and later times, and became the subject of a number of independent poems.

Although apparently the quintessential Ulster Cycle story in many respects, the tale's composition also displays a sophisticated satiric quality as a parody of the genre.

== Manuscripts and editions ==
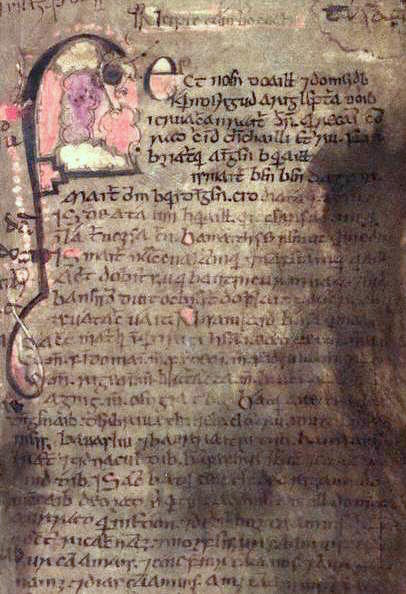
A page from the Book of Leinster.

The texts are preserved in 6 manuscripts:

- L Book of Leinster; Trinity College, Dublin
- H H.3.18, Trinity College, Dublin
- Hl Harley MS. 5280, fol. 40r-42r (old pagination; fol. 50, 52, 53r, rec. pag.); British Library
- R Rawlinson B. 512, fol. 105 v 2–108 r 2; Bodleian Library, Oxford.
- Edinburgh. MS. XXXVI, fol. 86r-91v; National Library of Scotland
- H.6.8, pp. 37–50; Trinity College, Dublin.

The text was edited by Rudolf Thurneysen (1935) as a single book, the LHHl texts with the R text printed below.

== Sources and composition ==
Of The Tale of Mac Da Thó's Pig's six manuscripts, the earliest and best form of the story is preserved in three texts: the Book of Leinster, in the paper leaves of H.3.18 in Trinity College, Dublin, and in the Harley 5280 manuscript in the British Library (formerly the British Museum). The earliest of these is the Book of Leinster, written c. AD 1160; the Harley 5280 manuscript was written in the first half of the 16th century, whereas H.3.18 was written c. 1700. In two of these manuscripts, H.3.18 and Harley 5280, the story is called Scēla muici M(ei)c Dathó, "Tidings of the pig of MacDathó". In the Book of Leinster, the story is similarly entitled Incipit Scēl Mucci M(ei)c Dathó. These texts are independent of each other, but are believed to be derived from a common source. Linguistically, this source is believed to be a lost 10th- or 11th-century transcript of a previous version dating to c. 800. The scene of the story, and its familiarity with the area of modern County Kildare, suggests a Leinster authorship; though it appears that the south-west of Ireland was also not unknown to the author.

A fourth version is recorded in the 15th-century MS Rawlinson B 512, now in the Bodleian Library, which is less accurate and conservative than the first three. In this redaction, the story is designated Scaradh Ulad ocus Connacht im choin M(ei)c Dá-Thó ocus immá muic, "The Separation of the Ulstermen and the Connaughtmen on account of the dog of Mac Dá-Thó and his pig". The manuscript does not preserve the original text with any accuracy, but contains innovations, expansions and other deviations in almost every section. This remoulding might date to the 11th or 12th century: The text is written by the same scribe as Baile in Scáil, which he took from the 11th century Book of Dub-Da-Leithe, leading Celticist Kuno Meyer to conclude the Rawlinson B 512 version was derived from the same source.

Linguistically, the text of Rawlinson B 512 is similar to Harley 5280, especially at the beginning; and there are also innovations in common with the Book of Leinster, showing that the redactor clearly had more than one manuscript at his disposal. In one instance the diction seems to come closer to the form of the original than any other surviving manuscript. An interpolation concerning Cú Roí points to this version's origin in Munster. In spite of some miscomprehension of the story on the part of the revisionist scribe, the literary style as a whole is somewhat smoother than in the earlier version, which Rudolf Thurneysen points out is of help for the understanding of the tale.

The last two manuscripts containing the story are Edinburgh MS. XXXVI in the National Library of Scotland and H.6.8 in Trinity College, Dublin, written 1690–1691 and c. 1777 respectively. These represent a modernisation of the story that might have been made in the 15th or 16th century. The two manuscripts differ from each other in some respects, and the spelling is very poor. William J. Watson notes that the text of MS. XXXVI was based on the redaction contained in Rawlinson B 512, but not upon that specific manuscript. The changes are so considerable in these modernisations that they are of no value for reconstructing the original text.

The story was apparently called Orgain Mic Da Thó ("The Slaughter of Mac Da Thó") in the days of yore, and mentioned as such in a poem by Flannacán mac Cellaig (d. 896) the king of Bregha, and the 10th-century prímscéla, the list of the "primary stories" or "chief stories" which the professional poetic class (filid) used to relate to kings.

== Summary ==
=== Mac Da Thó ===
Genealogy

Mac Da Thó, described as king of Leinster in the base manuscript, is actually probably Mes Róidia, the famed brugaid ('landowner', 'hospitaller') of Leinster and the brother of King Mes Gegra, as attested by a genealogical poem in the Book of Leinster, and by the R variant of the Tale. (Note: This genealogy is found in Book of Leinster, fol. 312b, LL Part F, §1, fol. 311b, referred to as the poem "Cethri meic Airtt Mis-Telmann ("four sons of Art Mes-Telmann") by Buttimer who notes it is also found in Rawlinson 502, p. 82b28ff. Mac Da Thó's alias Mes Roedia is also attested in the Rawlinson 512 variant of the Scéla.)

Both Mes Gegra and Mes Róidia are described as "Mac Dathó", or sons of two deaf-mutes in the Talland Étair ("the siege of Howth"), Mac Dathó in this instance being emended and construed as Mac Dá Túa, "the son of two silent persons". Rudolf Thurneysen dismissed this altogether as a dubious etymological tradition, (Note: And Thurneysen goes on to criticize the gullibility of "some redactors and poets who write dá with a long a (e.g. R[awlinson]) and make Thó alliterate with t.) however, a more recent scholar cautions that this nickname may hold some validity, connected with the behaviour of Mac Dathó who holds his silence or withholding information. (Note: To Ulster and Connacht, he remains silent on promising the dog to the other party as well.)

Mac Da Thó, according to the prose Dindsenchas, had a wife who was named Maine Athrai, and together they had a son Lena.

=== Plot ===
The story opens with Mac Da Thó the king (or the hosteller of Leinster (Note: The word brugaid is translated as "land-holder" by Meyer, and "hospitaller" by Buttimer. But Kershaw refers to them as keepers of bruidne "hostel", and "hosteller" is given as a valid translation of brugaid by P. W. Joyce.)), who possessed a hound called Ailbe which defended the entire province, which became famous throughout Ériu (Ireland) so that the monarchs of the other provinces wished to own it, namely Ailill and Medb of Connacht and Conchobar mac Nessa of Ulster. The messengers from Connacht offer an immediate tribute of 160 milch cows, a chariot and two of the finest horses of the Connachta, and the same tribute to be paid to Leinster again the following year, while the messengers of Ulster offer Mac Da Thó "jewellery and cattle and everything else from the north" and an alliance through the "great friendship" that would result.

Mac Da Thó, on his wife's advice, decides to deal with the conundrum by promising the dog to both parties, and letting them fight over it. Both delegations arrive for a feast at Mac Da Thó's Hostel on the same day, expecting to receive the hound. (Note: Mac Da Thó's Hostel is one of the five famed legendary "hostels" or feasting halls in Ireland at the time. The hostel itself has seven entrances, seven cauldrons full of beef and salted pork, and seven hearths; and fifty paces between each pair of doorways.)

Mac Da Thó has his pig slaughtered for the feast – an animal which had been nourished by 60 milch cows for seven years and which had 40 oxen spread across it for its enormous size. The pig immediately attracts the attention of the Ulaid (Ulstermen) and Connachta (Conachtmen), who must decide over how it is to be divided up, and to whom shall be awarded the curadmír or "hero's portion". It is agreed that the warriors shall challenge each other to boast their past exploits in battle. The Connacht warrior Cet mac Mágach asserts his right to carve the pig as the foremost champion, unless his claim could be proved otherwise:

[Cet] took knife in hand and sat down to the pig saying "Find among the men of Ériu one to match me in feats – otherwise I will carve the pig." ...Lóegure spoke then: "It is not right that Cet should carve the pig before our very eyes." Cet answered "One moment Lóegure, that I may speak with you. You Ulaid have a custom: every one of you who takes arms makes Connacht his object. You came to the border, then, and I met you; you abandoned your horses and charioteer and escaped with my spear through you. Is that how you propose to take the pig?" Lóegure sat down.

Cet manages to outboast his Ulster challengers for several turns: Óengus son of Lam Gabuid, Éogan son of Durthacht, Muinremur son of Gerrgend, and Mend son of Salchad (Note: Cet shames the challenger Óengus son of Lam Gabuid, by recounting that he had cut off Lam Gabuid's hands in battle; he shames Éogan son of Durthacht, the king of Fermag, by recounting that he put out his eye in a cattle-raid; he reminds Muinremur son of Gerrgend that he had taken his son's head as a trophy not six days earlier; Mend son of Salchad, that he had cut off his father's foot.) Cet even outboasts the champion Celtchair son of Uthecar, whom he had castrated with his spear, and a prince, Conchobar's son Cúscraid Mend Machae, whom he had pierced through neck with a spear during Cúscraid's first feat of arms, entailed by the ignominious abandonment by a third of Cúscraid's retinue. In each case, the challenging warriors are compelled to retake their seats in shame.

Just as Cet is exulting in his victory over the full warrior contingent of Ulster present, the Ulster hero Conall Cernach enters the hostel, and leaps into the middle of the hall to roars of welcome from the Ulaid. Cet and Conall acknowledge each other in an exchange of archaic rhetorical verses, and Cet concedes that Conall is a better warrior than he. Cet adds that his brother Anlúan would best Conall in a contest: "'It is our misfortune that he is not in the house.' 'Oh but he is,' said Conall, and taking Anlúan's head from his wallet he threw it at Cet's breast so that a mouthful of blood spattered over the lips."

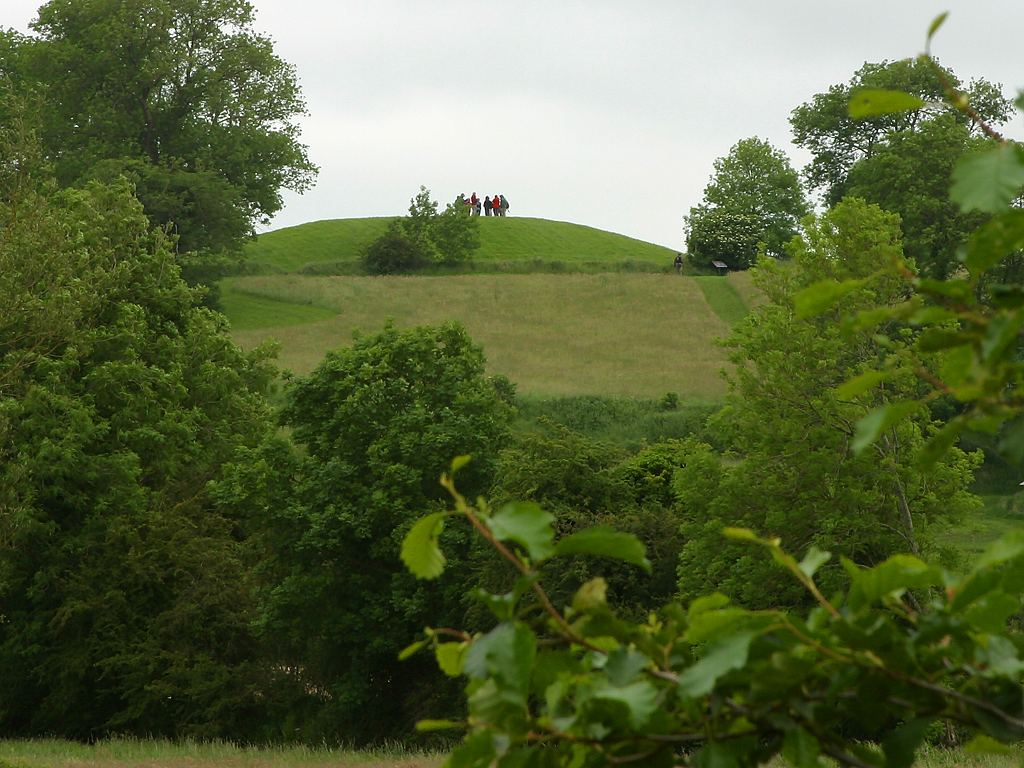
Emain Macha, seat of the Ulaid, where the women of Ulster must sing to the Connachta charioteer Fer Loga

In shame, Cet leaves the pig to Conall, who rightfully claims the belly as his portion, a burden for nine men, leaving only the fore-trotters to the Connachta. Dissatisfied with their meagre share, the Connachta rise against the Ulaid, and a drinking bout breaks out in the hostel and spills out into the courtyard outside. Fergus rips up a great oak tree from the ground by the roots. Mac Da Thó unleashes Ailbe to see which side it would choose; Ailbe sides with the Ulaid, and precipitates the rout of the Connachta. The dog itself is decapitated by Aillil's charioteer Fer Loga at Mag nAilbi (present-day Moynalvy, County Meath), (Note: The valley plain bordering the River Barrow from County Laois and County Carlow to County Kildare in Leinster.) and gave it its name, meaning "Plain of Ailbe". (Note: The incident also gave name to Ibhar Cinn Chonn, "the Yew-tree of the Hound's Head", a name for Connacht according to the R text. However, Thurneysen thought this locale as somewhere in Mag nAilbi.)

As the hosts sweep westward across Mide, Fer Loga hides in the heather and leaps into the chariot of Conchobar as it passes, seizing the king's head from behind. Conchobar promises him any ransom he wishes; Fer Loga asks to be taken to the Emain Macha, capital of Ulster, where the women of the Ulaid and their nubile daughters are to sing to him each evening in chorus, "Fer Loga is my darling". A year later, at the end of the tale, Fer Loga rides westward across Ath Luain with two of Conchobar's horses and golden bridles for them both.

== Additional material ==
=== Dindsenchas ===
Besides the onomastic account of Mag nAilbe, "The Plain of Ailbe" near the end of The Tale of Mac Da Thó's Pig, there are also other reminIscent Dindsenchas stories, namely, the Dindenchas of Mag Léna said to be named after Mac Da Thó's son Léna. This exists in the prose Rennes Dindsenchas version as well as the poetic Metrical Dindsenchas version, and appended to Thurneysen's edition of the tale.

The Metrical Dindenchas of Mag Léna I offers the onomastic explanation that Mag Léna (Moylen), a plain and heath in County Offaly, was named after Léna mac Róida (i.e., Mac Dathó's son Léna). It was the purported place where he was killed by the pig he was rearing. This is a fanciful explanation, and in reality, mag léna simply means "plain of meadows". Considerably more details are given in the prose version of the Rennes Dindsenchas,; which adds that Mac Da Thó's wife was named Maine Athrai. According to this account, Mac Da Thó's pig actually belonged to his son Léna, who first found the pig at Daire Bainb ("slips grove") in the eastern parts of [Sliabh] Bladma (Slieve Bloom Mountains), and nurtured it until the animal had seven inches of fat on its snout. The pig was wanted for Mac Da Thó's feast, and 50 swine were offered in exchange by Lena's mother, but he refused the barter. On the day the pig was to be delivered, Léna went with his pig to a spot called Dubclais (Black Trench). The pig was foraging, and flipped the soil of the trench over him, causing his death, but Lena killed the swine with the sword. Mac Da Thó's swineherd Follscaide delivers the pig to his master's feast, and erected the tomb on the plain.

A version slightly more embellished than this is recorded in the Book of Lecan, transcribed and translated by Eugene O'Curry.

=== Verse telling ===
There are also two poems on the hound Ailbe or the Mac Dathó's pig that have been written. None of these poems inspired by the tale appears to have been directly based on the surviving text, however, suggesting that other versions of the same tale served as their inspiration.

The first poem, (Note: The first poem is appended to the old text in the Book of Leinster, Harley 5280 and H.3.18.) which begins "A gillu Connacht nad-liu/for trommacht ac apairt gó (O lad of Connacht whom I do not accuse of slowness in telling lies)", is used by the poet as opportunity to display knowledge of the names of Irish heroes in general, not confining the list to characters of the tale.

The second is a poem in praise of Mac Dathó's pig, (Note: The poem follows the first in Harley 5280, and appears also in three other manuscripts: the Book of Lecan, Laud 610 in the Bodelian Library and lastly in the Stowe manuscript collection.) (Note: In the Laud 610 and Stowe manuscripts, the poem in praise of Mac Datho's pig forms an appendix to the Dindsenchas of Mag Léna, mentioned above.) and "practically a panegyric on the pig". This poem is in fact, Metrical Dindsenchas on Mag Lena II.

== Criticism ==
=== Narrative style ===
In the assessment of medievalist Nora Chadwick, "the tale is told with brilliant narrative power": its terseness, humour and laconic brevity is reminiscent of the best of the Icelandic sagas. The dialogue is particularly masterly in its "understatement and crisp repartee", with "the utmost condensation and economy" in its choice of words. "[I]n the few remarks made by Mac Da Thó to his visitors, all his previous train of thought, all his cunning and address, are suggested in a few brief words intended by him to hide his true designs from his guests, while suggesting to ourselves his hidden intention."

In spite of the literary finish of the surviving written versions, the tale remains one to be told orally. The story is characterised by "a total absence of reflection"; "not a word is wasted, no statement is expanded". The events of the narrative are expressed with swift movement, aiming to arouse and excite the interest and attention of the hearer rather than to stimulate the thought of the reader. "The story-teller makes use of the element of surprise, of quick developments and dramatic moments. He seeks to impress by rapid crescendo to a startling climax, and a shock"; as when Cet first reluctantly yields to Conall Cernach in the absence of Ánluan, then is unexpectedly and abruptly shamed in full view of the warriors of Ireland, by Conall suddenly hurling the head-trophy of Ánluan "at the breast of his opponent with such violence that a gush of blood burst through Cet's lips".

Chadwick identifies a story calculated to appeal to men rather than women: a stark contrast with "the refined and delicately handled story of Eochaid and Étaín and their supernatural adventures with the god Midir", with "the poetical beauty of the story of Deirdre and the sons of Uisneach", indeed even with the later heroic tales of the Finn Cycle – "stories of life in the open – of hunting, and romance, and of the magic and prowess of a simpler and less organised society than that of Mac Da Thó's feast." The gulf separating the tale from this broad range of genres may be used to illustrate the impressive "range of theme which the early Irish story-tellers had at their command". In Chadwick's final assessment:

One thing we can say with confidence. Our prose saga of Mac Da Thó's Pig is a work of art of high quality in its own right. Without a touch of romance, without the glamour of magic or of the supernatural, almost without antiquarian elements, it holds us throughout by its swift unflagging narrative, the rapid pitch and toss of its dialogue, the brilliant quality of the dramatic presentation. Never has the tradition of the Irish Heroic Age received a more compelling form...

=== Theme and antiquity ===
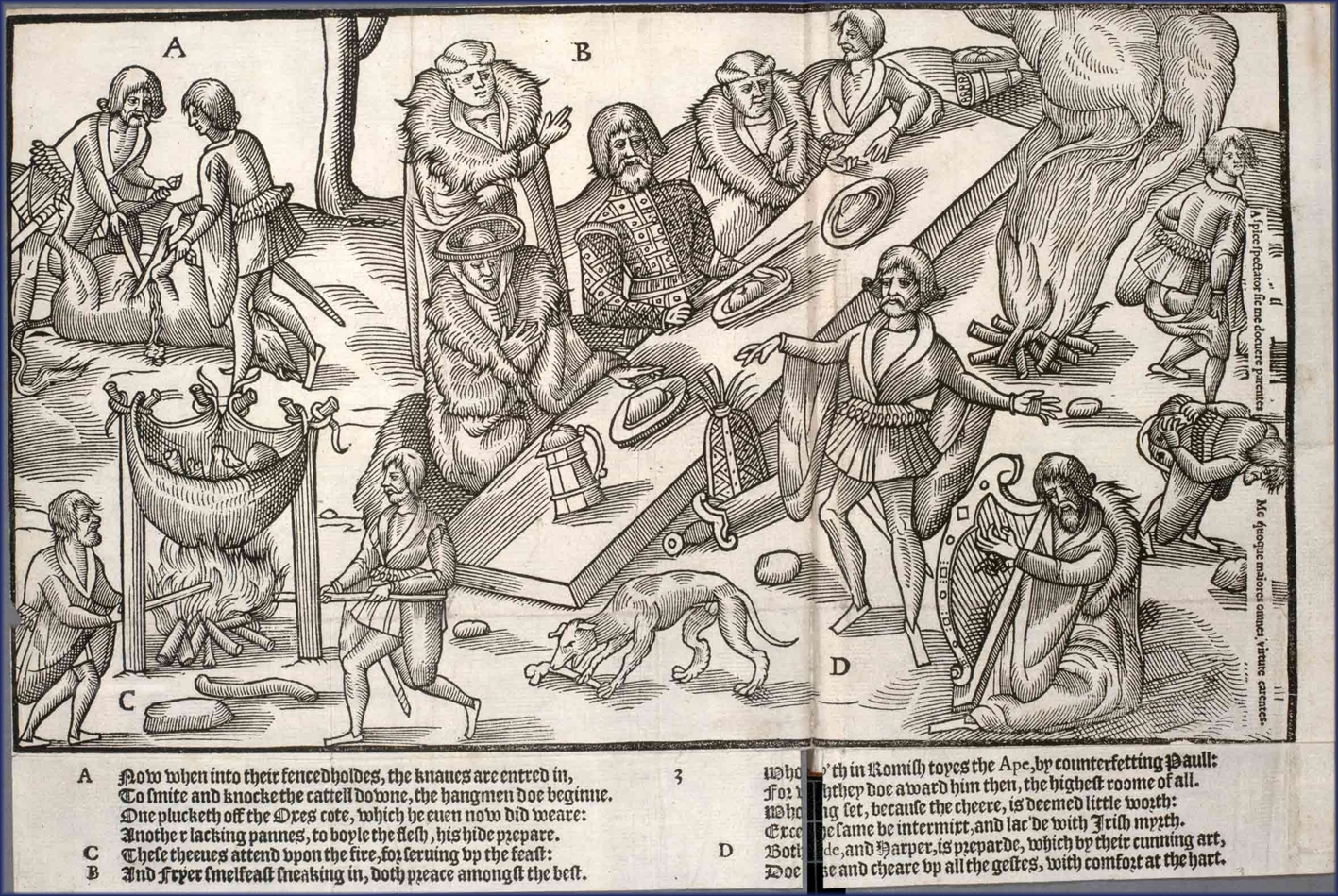
Feasting remained an important part of Gaelic Irish society, even into the Tudor period, when the Harley 5280 version of the tale was composed

The Tale of Mac Da Thó's Pig has been referred to as "one of the most brilliantly told of the early Irish sagas", which "purports to give a picture of the old heroic life in Ireland and its warlike spirit". The central theme of the narrative is the curadmír, the right of the greatest champion at a feast to receive the "hero's portion" from a great central cauldron containing the communal supply. Wherever a great body of heroes was gathered together, this right was determined by boasting contests between the contenders: to assert the right to the hero's portion, a claimant must first produce his credentials by boasting his heroic exploits, and then shame his opponents by quashing their objections and counter-claims. In the event that this unsuccessful and the distinction between the heroes present unclear, the matter would be taken to arbitration, as in the similar Ulster Cycle tale Fled Bricrenn; Chadwick suggests that this arbitration may be parodied when Mac Da Thó releases Ailbe to see which province the hound would side with first.

Chadwick argues that the antiquity of the tale's theme – feasting – is probably the most anciently attested of all Celtic stories. The heroic communal feast was apparently central to the Celtic tradition, and classical ethnographers of the Posidonian tradition, notably the 2nd-century Athenaeus, give accounts of Gaulish feasts which closely parallel their Insular counterparts. Similarly, in the 1st century BC, the Greek ethnographer Diodorus Siculus describes in detail how the Gauls "honour distinguished men with the best portions of the meat", and how disputes often lead to challenges in which "they set about glorifying the valour of their forefathers and boasting of their own prowess; and at the same time they deride and belittle their opponent, and try by their speeches to rob him of the courage he has in his heart".

A secondary theme which drives the contest for the champion's portion is the rivalry between the royal provinces of Connacht and Ulster, resolved in the contest of the two heroes Cet Mac Mágach and Conall Cernach. The presentation of this rivalry is coloured by the author's peculiar Leinster viewpoint. He turns both provinces to ridicule by the cunning of Mac Da Thó, King of Leinster; in particular, the author's political sympathies favour Connacht and remain hostile to Ulster to the end. To the heroes assembled, Mac Da Thó boasts that all the food provided for the feast is a mere trifle for the Leinstermen. It is tempting to conclude that the inspiration of the story is the claim of Leinster to supersede both Ulster and Connacht. However, it is apparent that by the time of the tale's composition, even the story-teller does not take the political issues very seriously, using the theme instead as a vehicle for a good story.

An unusual element is that the tale draws its characters from essentially the same cast as Táin Bó Cuailnge, making mention of some thirty heroes from that narrative, yet never once mentions Cú Chulainn. Chadwick suggests this is probably an indication of the antiquity of the tradition of the story's tradition, predating the development of Cú Chulainn's story within the Ulster Cycle. Some of the rhetorical verse elements are old and obscure, but certain seemingly parodic elements of the genre at least suggest a later composition of the present form.

=== Satiric elements ===
While The Tale of Mac Da Thó's Pig appears to be the quintessential Ulster Cycle story in theme and narrative, there are certain unusual elements of the extant forms which suggest it may have a more satiric quality, parodying the heroic genre of the Ulster Cycle. The eponymous pig of Mac Da Thó may be mythic in origin, but its highly exaggerated size may also be satiric. In the Táin Bó Cuailnge, the Ulaid and Connachta go to war over a mythic best, the finest bull in Ireland, whereas here they come to blows over a dog.

In "an imitable passage of compressed humour", Mac Da Thó promises the dog to both parties, then feigns ignorance when both arrive on the same day. During the bragging contest, the heroes of the Ulaid are not merely shamed, but are made to look ridiculous. Hyperbole is used to humorous effect when Conall flings the head of Ánluan at his opponent Cet. Thurneysen notes that in the Harley 5280 manuscript "the mutual slaying of the guests" is referred to as "'performing a good drinking round'" (so-imól) – a "somewhat coarse joke" that was revised or omitted in the other manuscripts because apparently the copyists did not understand it. Gantz notes that Fer Loga's demand "that the nubile women of Ulaid sing 'Fer Loga is my darling' to him every night is so comical that its inclusion cannot possibly be inadvertent". In Chadwick's assessment, the story is "a glorious travesty of the Ancient World by one who honoured and laughed at its traditions".

The tale's composition in the early period of the Viking Age in Ireland "may have done something to substitute laconic humour and a spirit of ripe burlesque for the dignity and poetical beauty" of other treasures of the Irish sagas. To call the tale a parody would not be entirely accurate; instead, it seems "that a literary genius has presented us with a well-preserved heroic tradition, seen through the prismatic lens of a later age. He brings to his theme a ripe sophistication, a concentrated irony, and a gay and lighthearted hyperbole".

=== Parallels ===
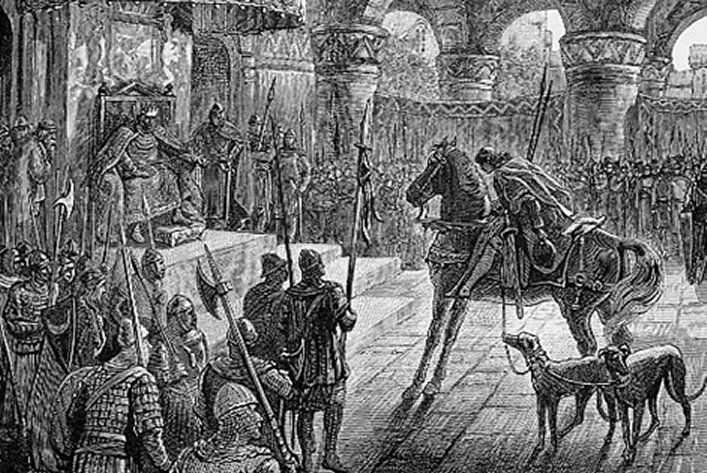
Culhwch entering King Arthur's Court.

In the original version of the story, Mac Da Thó's pig may have been protagonist, showing parallels with the wild boar hunts of Arthurian legend.

The hound-chase the boar Twrch Trwyth in 11th-century Arthurian Welsh tale Culhwch and Olwen is accompanied by a description of the various pieces of geography being passed by, and likewise, in the closing of the Tale of Mac Da Thó's Pig the description of the route taken by the fighting hound Ailbe's is rife with geographical details.

Thurneysen notes that the poems about Mac Da Thó's pig use the words torc (boar) and muc (pig) interchangeably. This is subject to contention, because Edward J. Gwynn translated torc as "chieftain richly clad", referring to the owner, not the pig, but Thurneysen argued this was indeed a 'boar', and its well-cladness was "in regard to skin and fat", contrasted with imnocht ('stark naked') that occurs in the subsequent line.
