= Brain balls (disambiguation) =

Brain Balls may refer to:

- Brain balls, small stone-like balls claimed in Irish history and legend to have been made from the heads or brains of enemies
- Brain Balls, a character in the animated series Futurama
- Brain Ball, an annual event for the Welltower charity foundation

== See also ==
- Mindball
