= Fled Bricrenn =

Story from the Ulster Cycle of Irish mythology

Fled Bricrenn (Old Irish "Bricriu's Feast") is a story from the Ulster Cycle of Irish mythology. Bricriu, an inveterate troublemaker, invites the nobles of the Ulaid to a feast at his new bruiden (hostel, banquet hall) at Dún Rudraige (Dundrum, County Down), where he incites three heroes, Cúchulainn, Conall Cernach, and Lóegaire Búadach, to compete for the "champion's portion" of the feast. The three heroes perform several feats, and travel to Connacht to be judged by Ailill and Medb, and to Munster to be judged by Cú Roí. On each occasion, Cúchulainn is proclaimed champion, but the other two competitors refuse to accept their losses. Eventually, back at Emain Macha, the three heroes are each challenged by a giant churl to cut off his head, on the condition that they allow him to cut off their heads in return. First Lóegaire, then Conall, takes up the challenge and cuts off the churl's head, only for him to pick it up and leave, but when the churl returns the following night they are nowhere to be seen. Only Cúchulainn lives up to his side of the bargain by agreeing to be beheaded. The churl spares his life, reveals himself to be Cú Roí in disguise, and announces that Cúchulainn's bravery and honour make him an undisputed champion.

The story dates from the 8th century and is found in several manuscripts, including the Lebor na hUidre (c. 1106). The motif of warriors competing for the champion's portion is found in another Ulster Cycle tale, Scéla Mucce Maic Dathó ("The Tale of Mac Dathó's Pig"), and is reminiscent of descriptions of customs of the Celts of continental Europe as recorded by classical authors. The beheading challenge also has classical parallels, and appears in later medieval literary works like Sir Gawain and the Green Knight.

Fled Bricrenn is not to be confused with Fled Bricrenn ocus Loinges mac nDuíl Dermait ("Bricriu's Feast, and the Exile of the sons of Dóel Dermait"), another Ulster Cycle tale which features Bricriu and a prestigious portion of food (airigid).

== Manuscript sources ==
- Ed. XL: pp. 69–76 (Edinburgh, National Library of Scotland). 'Cennach ind Ruanada' only.
- Egerton 93: f. 20R-25V (London, British Library). Fragment.
- MS 1336 (H 3.17): pp. 683–710 (Dublin, Trinity College Library). Fragment.
- MS 1337 (H 3.18): p. 607 (Dublin, Trinity College Library). Glossed extracts.
- Codex Vossianus: f 3R-9V (Leiden). Fragments. CELT
- MS 23 E 25 or Lebor na hUidre (LU): p. 99b–112b +H (Dublin, RIA). End missing. Contains interpolations by H.
