= Mesgegra =

Legendary King of Leinster in the Ulster Cycle

- King of Leinster
- Other names: Mess-gegra, Mes Gegra, Mes Gedra
- Texts: The Tale of Mac Da Thó's Pig, Cethri meic Airtt Mis-Telmann
- Region: Leinster

Genealogy
- Parents: Deaf and mute parents; father's name was Art (belonged to the tribe of Domnann)
- Siblings: Mac Da Thó aka Mes Róidia, Mesdana, Mesdomnand
- Consort: Buan

In Irish mythology, Mesgegra (Mess-gegra, Mes Gegra, Mes Gedra) was king of Leinster during the events of the Ulster Cycle, and was also the brother of Mac Da Thó aka Mes Róidia in The Tale of Mac Da Thó's Pig.

Mesgegra was killed by the Ulster warrior Conall Cernach, who preserved Mesgegra's brain in lime as trophy. But the brain-ball was stolen by the Conacht warrior Cet mac Mágach who shot it at the Ulster king Conchobar Mac Nessa and lodged in his head, killing him seven years later, thus fulfilling the prophecy that Mesgegra would somehow avenge his own death.

== Name ==
Mes-gegra is mentioned in Cormac's glossary, only to state that Mes signifies 'edge' or 'blade'. (Note: This indicates that Cormac mac Cuilennáin (d. 908) knew about Mes-gegra and perhaps the Ulster cycle story surrounding him.)

Mes-gegra shared this Mes- prefix with his siblings and father.

Margaret E. Dobbs guesses that Mesgegra would have originally meant "warrior (or sword) of Cecra". In Ancient Chaldea, "Mes-" meaning "hero or champions" appears in the roster of kings, and this Chaldean word derived from Sumerian mas 'cut, divide' or mâsu 'warrior'. Dobbs ventured that the Irish Mes- name convention could have been borrowed from that far region.

== Genealogy ==
Mesgegra (Messcegra), Mesroida (Mesreta), Mesdana, Mesdomnand are named as siblings in the poem Cethri meic Airtt Mis-Telmann ("four sons of Art Mes-Telmann") (Note: These spellings are according to Dobbs, from the Book of Leinster, with variants from Trinity College MS H.2.7.) (Note: The poem is found in these codices: Rawlinson 502, p. 82b28ff; Book of Leinster, LL. facs. 311b29. 378a; H.2.7. col. 72. T.C.D.; LL Part F, §1, fol. 312b (p. 1327);) Their father Art is said to have belonged to the tribe of Domnann, and the settlement of the British Dumnonii in East Leinster appears to be incontrovertible historical fact.

Mesgegra was a King of Leinster, Mesroidia a wealthy brugaid of Leinster also known as Mac-Da-Tho, Mesdana, a warrior, and Mesdomnand, a poet according to the stated poem. Mesroída aka Mac Datho (Note: These spellings are according to Buttimer, who uses the Rawlinson 502 text)

Mesroída who was the brugaid (hospitallerButtimer (1982), p. 61, from brug "hostel") was of course the titular figure of Scéla Muicce Mac Dáthó "The Tale of Mac Da Thó's Pig", and the final strophe of the poem recapitulates that story by telling of the pig and hound and the banquet and the "Four times seven fifties" who died in the mansion.Buttimer (1982), p. 61 (Note: Mac Da Tho's alias Mesroeda is given in the R (Rawlingson recension) of SMMD, but he is changed to rí amrae for Laignib ("wonderful king of Leinster"), without the alias in the L H recensions. John Rhys equates Mac Da Tho with Mesgegra. Since it is stated that both Mesgegra and Mes Mes Róid[i]a had death-mute parents in the Siege of Howth, on the strength of that information, the nickname Mac Da Thó which means 'the son of two silent persons' (tó recte tuá) does become applicable to both figures.)

== Life and death ==
Siege of Howth

Mesgegra (Mess-gegra) was king of Leinster (North Leinster), whose parents were deaf and mute; his brother was named Mes-Róidia (var. Mes roida). (Note: Base text is Book of Leinster, variant H is Harleian 5280, fol. 54b, although dated by Stokes to the 15th century, belongs to the early 16th century and is in the hand of Gilla Riabhach O Cléirigh.)

To Leinster arrived the Ulster poet Athirne, who had been dispatched from his king Conchobar mac Nessa and was making circuit around Ireland to exact ruthless demands of precious jewels, or women, or even an eye, on pain of receiving the poet's invective and dishonor. The poet intended to goad the Leinstermen into killing him, thereby causing war between Leinster and Ulster, so he named an impossible bribe, a lost buried heirloom jewel, but that was fortuitously found and given him.

Mesgegra yielded his wife Buan to the poet for a night, but did not have his wife taken away afterwards, although he had to make a binding promise that she would be given to whichever Ulsterman arrived bearing Mesgegra's head. The poet then carried away him 150 wives of Leinstermen, so that the Leinster army did give pursuit, and clashed with the Ulster army. The ensuing battle, the Siege of Howth, was a bloody stalemate which ceased when Leinster retreated and erected a red wall as barrier, which Ulstermen were forbidden from crossing (due to a geis).

Mesgegra was incautiously tarrying with just his gillie in his company at a spot called Cassán Chlóinta (Path of Clane), where a strange incident unfolds. A giant nut larger than a man's head floats down the stream, which Mesgegra takes and halves with a knife. The gillie wakes up claiming to have had an evil vision, and asks if his half of the nut was saved, then slashes off the king's hand without properly confirming. Learning his mistake afterwards, the gillie commits suicide. The one-handed Mesgegra, forced to act as his own charioteer, is met with worse luck when he encounters the Ulster warrior Conall Cernach, who was seeking revenge for two fallen brothers in the earlier battle. To make it a fair fight, Conall fought him with one hand tied to his side. Conall is triumphant and carries Mesgegara's severed head to Leinster, hoping to claim Mesgegra's queen as his prize (as the poet predicted), but she falls dead in sorrow.

Mesgegra's head was hollowed out, and the brain mixed with lime for Connall to take back to Ulster's capital Emain Macha as trophy.

Aided Conchubair

Mesgegra's calcified brain became Connal's bragging piece in Ulster. Mesgegra's brain was later stolen by Cet Mat Matach (Cet mac Mágach) of Connacht as it was prophesied that Mesgegra would eventually avenge himself even in death. Cet shot the brain-ball and lodged in the head, resulting in a horrific injury. Mesgegra's brain ball made Conchobar unable to over-exert himself, but he still survive the injury another 7 years, when the brain-ball dislodged with Conchobar's fury at the news of the crucifixion of Christ.

It is worth mentioning that Cet had been outdone and shamed by Connal (and the Connachtsmen shamed by the Ulstermen in general by Connal's administration of the curadmír or "Champion's Portion" in the Scéla Muicce Meicc Dá Thó), and the trouble-making hosteller named Mac Dá Thó of Leinster, also called Mesroeda, is identified as a brother of Mesgegera the king. (Note: As noted in §Name and genealogy, supra.)

== Comparative analyses ==
Mesgegra's brain-ball has been likened to the táthlum or táthluib "sling-stone", such as the Lugh's sling-stone which was a hardened ball of blood and sand. (Note: Lugh's tathlum is described in a poem translated by O'Curry.)

The one-handed (French: manchot) Mesgegra fighting Connal with a hand tied has been paralleled with Nuada of the Silver Arm and his arm-cutting foe Sreng whose name can mean "cord" or "tug away", as well as with the Norse god Týr who lost one hand in order to bind Fenris wolf. The one-handed figure appears alongside a one-eyed (French: borgne) Eochaid mac Luchta, the king of South Connacht, whose Norse counterpart is Óðinn. Scowcroft conjectures there was some wisdom-gaining underlying theme, similar to Óðinn losing an eye in Mimir's Well, as the strange nut that Mesgegra ate is reminiscent of the hazelnut of water-pool of Segais which imparted wisdom to the Salmon of Knowledge.
