= Clochafarmore =

Standing stone in County Louth, Ireland

- Cloch an Fhir Mhóir (Irish)
- Cúchulainn's Stone
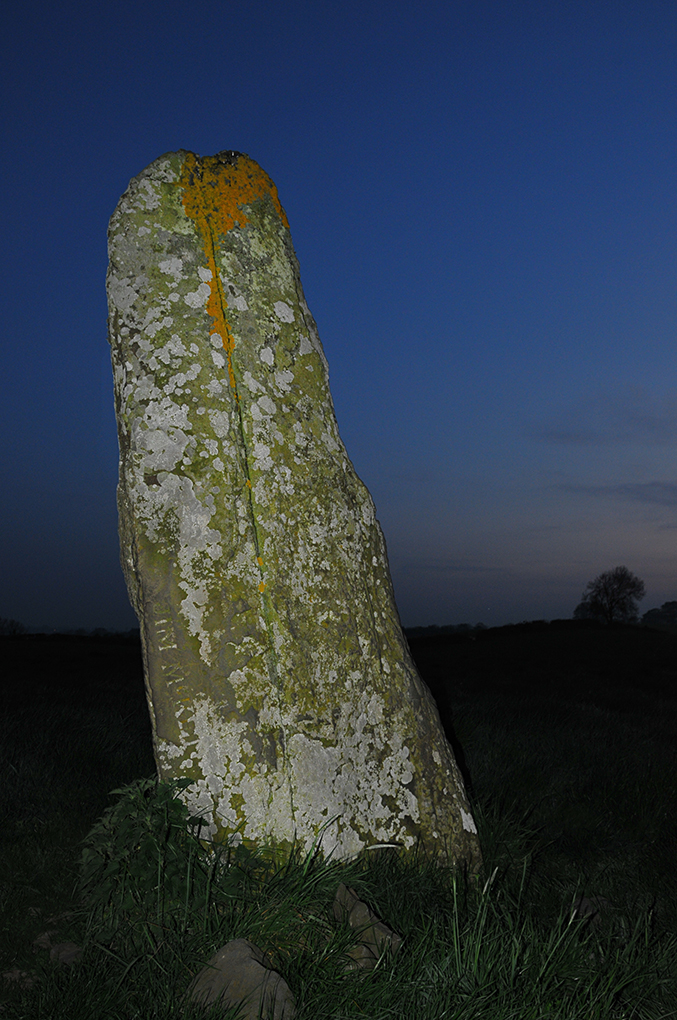
- The stone in 2008

- Location in Ireland
- 53.974505°N 6.465919°W
- Type: Standing stone
- Location: Louth, Ireland

History
- Built: c. 1450 BC

Site notes
- Material: Stone
- Height: 3 m (9.8 ft)
- Circumference: 4 m (13 ft)
- Public access: yes

National monument of Ireland
- Official name: Clochafarmore
- Reference no.: 474

Clochafarmore (Irish: Cloch an Fhir Mhóir, meaning "stone of the great man") is a menhir (standing stone) and National Monument in County Louth, Ireland.

== Location ==
Clochafarmore is located 1.4 km (0.87 mi) east-northeast of Knockbridge, Dundalk on the left bank of the Fane River.

== History and legend ==
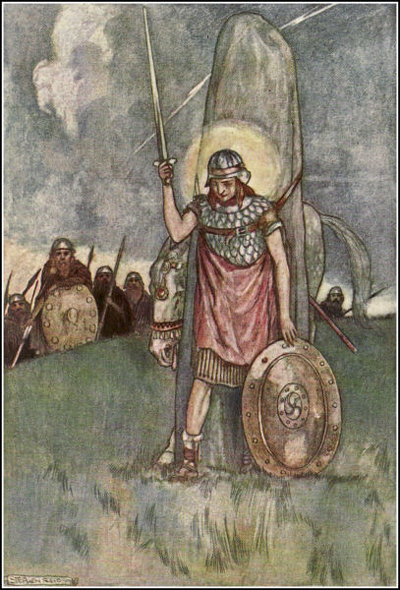
Cú Chulainn's death, illustration by Stephen Reid (1904).

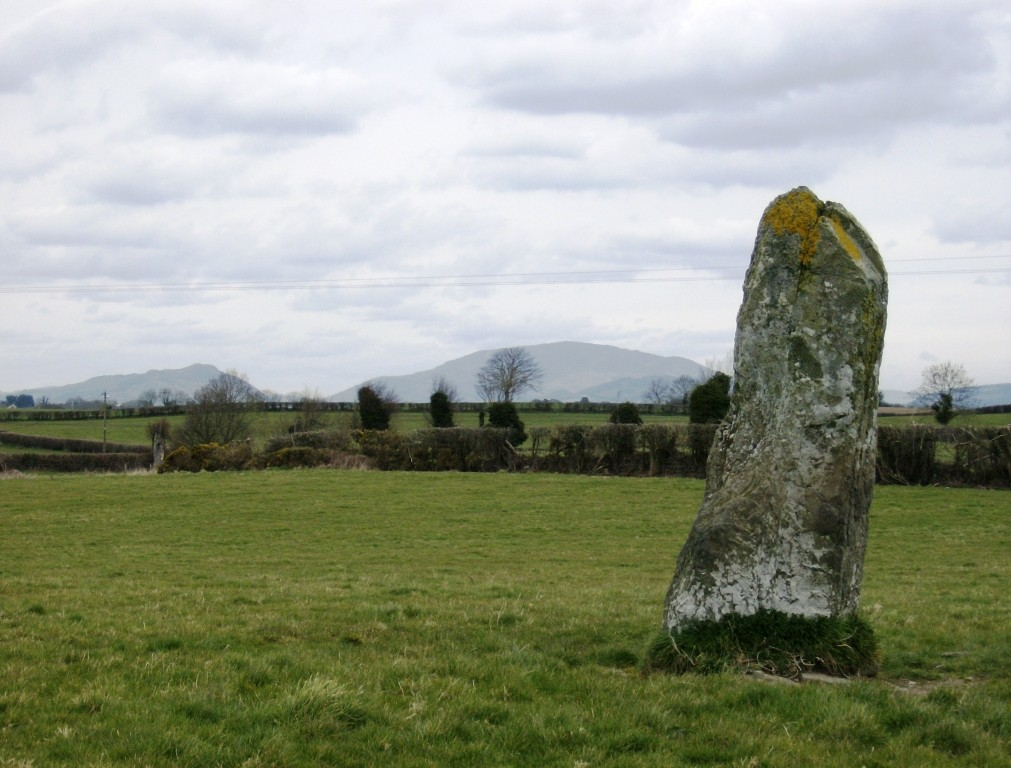
Clochafarmore standing in a field.

This standing stone is traditionally associated with the death of the legendary hero Cú Chulainn. Lugaid mac Con Roí has three magical spears made, and it is prophesied that a king will fall by each of them. With the first he kills Cú Chulainn's charioteer Láeg; with the second he kills Cú Chulainn's horse, Liath Macha; with the third he hits Cú Chulainn, mortally wounding him. Cú Chulainn ties himself to a standing stone — traditionally Clochafarmore ("Stone of the Big Man"), which had been erected to mark the grave of a past great warrior.

Cú Chulainn continues to fight his enemies, and it is only when a raven (the traditional form of The Morrígan) lands on his shoulder that his enemies believe he is dead. Lugaid approaches and beheads him, but as he does so the "hero-light" burns around Cú Chulainn and his sword falls from his hand and cuts Lugaid's hand off. The light disappears only after his right hand is cut off.

The region is known as An Breisleach Mór, "The Great Carnage", while the field in which this stone stands is called the Field of Slaughter. In the 1920s a bronze spearhead was found in the field, perhaps showing it to be a genuine ancient battle-site.

The stone traditionally identified as Cloghafarmore is 3 metres high. It is marked on the Ordnance Survey map of 1911. It bears the inscription "JIM MCKENNA 1912," of unknown significance.
