= Achall =

Ulster Cycle of Irish mythology character

Achall, daughter of Cairbre Nia Fer, king of Tara, and his wife Fedelm Noíchrothach, is a minor character from the Ulster Cycle of Irish mythology. After her brother Erc was killed by Conall Cernach, she died of grief on a hill near Tara, which was named Achall after her.

The legendary High King of Ireland Túathal Techtmar is said to have taken power after defeating the previous High King, Elim mac Conrach, in battle on the hill of Achall. According to The Expulsion of the Déisi, another legendary High King, Cormac mac Airt, lived on the hill of Achall after he lost an eye, his physical imperfection meaning he could no longer rule at Tara. The hill is now known as Skryne.
