= Bodleian Library, MS Rawlinson B 512 =

- Bodleian Library
- Also known as: Ancient Irish Deeds and Writings, Chiefly Relating to Landed Property, from the Twelfth to the Seventeenth Century, with Translations, Notes, and a Preliminary Essay
- Date: 15th — 16th century AD
- Place of origin: Ireland
- Language(s): Early Modern Irish
- Material: vellum

Oxford, Bodleian Library, Rawlinson B. 512 is an Irish vellum manuscript in quarto, numbering 154 folios and written in double columns by multiple scribes in the course of the late 15th and early 16th centuries. The compilation presents a diverse range of medieval texts in verse and in prose, some of which are in Latin, while the vast majority is written in the Irish language. It is a composite manuscript, consisting of five portions which were originally distinct volumes: I (fos. 101-22, 1-36, 45-52), II (fos. 53-75), III (fos. 75B-100, 37-44), IV (fos. 123-44) and V (fos. 145-54).

== Contents ==
I-b (fos. 1-36)
folios	Description
1a	Conclusion of Gein Branduib maic Echach ocus Áedáin maic Gabráin ("The Birth of Brandub son of Eochu and of Aedán son of Gabrán")
1a	Poem Kailleoracht. Tonfeid, a Christ, conic muir.
1a-2a	Ferchuitred Medba ("Medb's husband allowance")
2b	[blank]
3a-b	Poem (37 stanzas) on the Kings of Ireland from Loegaire to Brian Boru.
3b	Gilla Cómáin mac Gilla Samthainde, poem beginning A andáladh anall uile (imperfect copy)
4b-	Poem "Tadg og oDa […] cecinit", much faded.
5a-30a	Tripartite Life of St. Patrick (Beatha Padraic), with marginalia
30a	Topographical verses, beginning Crioch Midhi inn[e]osad duibh ocus crioch Breadh mborrfadach.
30a	Prose notes, Torannacht ocus criocharacht na Midi ("The measurement and mering of Meath")
30a	Latin notes about Risterdus Nugent (ob. 1591) and Katherine Nugent (ob. 1604)
30b	English notes, much faded
31a	Irish Life of St. Brigit (beginning lost)
35b-36a	Accounts of six miracles attributed to St. Brigit
36a	Two late stanzas, beginning Tlachtga ingen Mhodh[a] Ruith ramhaigh
36b	Poem beginning Domun duthain a loinde, and note in prose.

III-b (fos. 37-44)
folios	Description
37a-39a	Apgitir Chrábaid ("The Alphabet of Piety")
39a	Teist Choemáin Chlúana maic Treoin for scoil oc Sinchill Chille Ached ("Coeman of Cluain mace Treoin's testimony as to the young school of Sinchell of Cell Ached").
39a-40b	Irish treatise on eight deadly sins and eight chief virtues
40b-41a	Regula Coluim Cille ("Rule of St. Columba")
41a	Three-line paragraph, beginning Cosc mo Colmaócc maic uBéonna dond óclaicg.
41a	Irish Legend of St. Gregory the Great
41b-42a	Invocation of Christ, prayers to Mary, John the Child and John the Baptist
42a-42b	Mugrón comarba Coluim cille ("Mugrón, a successor of St. Columba")
42b-44a	Na Arrada ("The Remissions").
44a-44b	Irish Vision of Laisrén of Cluain (Connaught)
44b	Note on Churches of Munster

I-c (fos. 45-52)
folios	Description
45a-47b	Treatise on the Psalter, with Irish note (f. 45a) dated October 1731.
48a-51b	Cáin Adomnáin ("The Law of Adomnán")
51b	Irish poem on the Maledictive Psalms (13 stanzas), beginning Sreth a salmaib suad slan / feib rohorddaig Adamnan.
51b	Immathcor nAilella ocus Airt ("The Mutual Restoration of Ailill and Art")
51b-52a	Fragment, beginning muintire. Olldam dicit.
52a	Poem on ecclesiastical seasons and days, beginning A Loingsig a hEs mac nEirc.
52a-52b	Fil and grian glindi hái, poem ascribed to the briugu Dá Choca, with prose preface and glosses.
52b	Seven-line note, Tomus cuirp Crist arna gabail Chonsantin impir ("The measure of Christ's body when found by Emperor Constantine")

II (fos. 53-75)
folios	Description
53a-64a	Félire Óengusso, preface, part of prologue, epilogue (with notes).
56b	Poem (5 stanzas) in rinnard metre, beginning Bendacht indrig [for ríg] donélaib.
64a	Poem (2 stanzas) in rinnard metre, beginning Cach noem robói [for bói], fil, bias.
64a	Quatrain beginning Cech noeb, cech noebuag, cech mairtir, with scribal note
64b	Legend of St. Moling
64b	Legend of St. Moling and the Devil
64b	Scribal note
65a-71a	Irish homily on the Nativity
71a	Two poems, beginning: (1) Buadacht uaim dom compan an tí as iomlan a threghib (ascribed to Rod Ó Cor(n)in); (2) Ag scoith na bPluingeadach (ascribed to Brian mac Dergan).
71a-75b	Irish homily on the Passion
73a	Note by scribe identifying himself as Dubthach Ó Duibgennan writing for Conchobor Ó Maelchonairi.

III-a (f. 75b-100)
folios	Description
76a-97b	Lebor Gabála Érenn ("Book of the Takings of Ireland"), including Flathiusa hErend.
97b	Note on Ireland's resemblance to Paradise, beginning Inis hErenn, tra, ro-suidigad isin fuined.
97b	Triad on first three judgment in Ireland
97b-98b	Scéla Túain maic Cairill do Fhinnén Maige Bile ("The Story of Tuan mac Cairill by Finnian of Mag Bile")
97b	Poem (7 stanzas) about Tuan mac Cairill
97b	Quatrain, beginning Dia rorannta cóicid Erenn.
97b	4 quatrains about Beltaine, Lugnasad, Samain and Imbolc
99a-100b	Scéla Alexandir maic Pilip, episodes from the Irish Alexander saga.
100b	Compert Conchobuir, story of Ness daughter of Eochaid Sálbuide
100b	Out of place scribal note to Lebor Gabála Érenn

I-a (fos. 101-122)
folios	Description
101a-105b	Baile in Scáil ("The Phantom's Frenzy")
105b-108a	Scéla mucce maic Dathó ("The Story of Mac Dá Thó's Pig")
108a	Legend of St Patrick, Enna son of King Loegaire, and Michael the Archangel
108b	Senchus muici fhéili Martain ("The tradition of the St Martinmas pig")
109a-114b	Airec Menman Uraird maic Coisse The Stratagem of Urard (Irard) mac Coisse."
114b-115b	Erchoitmed ingine Gulidi ("The Excuse of Gulide's daughter")
115b-116a	Orgain / Aided trí mac nDiarmata mac Cerrbeóil ("The Destruction / Death of the Three Sons of Diarmait mac Cerbbeóil/Cerbaill")
116a-116b	Aided Maelodráin mic Dímma Chróin ("The death of Maelodrán mac Dímma Chróin")
116b	Agallamh Cormaic 7 Fithil ("The Dialogue between King Cormac and Fíthel (Féigbriathrach)")
–	[Two leaves lost]
117a-118a	Tochmarc Emire ("The Wooing of Emer"), beginning missing
117b-118b	Verba Scáthaige ("The Words of Scáthach")
117b-118b	Forfess Fer Fálgae ("The Siege of the Men of Fálga")
119a-120b	Immram Bráin maic Febail ("The Voyage of Bran mac Febail")
120b	Echtrae Connlai ("The Otherworldly Adventure of Connla the Red"), fragment
121a	Poem A reilec laech Leithe Cuinn (The Graves of the Kings at Clonmacnois)
121b	Poem, dialogue between Findchú and Sétna
121b-122a	Note on the Besom out of Fánait
122a-122b	Esnada tige Buchet ("The Songs of Buchet's House")
122b	Scél Baile Bindbérlaig ("The Story of Baile the Sweet-voiced"), fragment.

IV (fos. 123-44)
folios	Description
123a-139b	Lorgaireacht an tSoidhigh Naomhtha ("The Quest for the Holy Grail"), Early Modern Irish Arthurian tale, fragment.
126a	Poem ascribed to St. Columba, beginning Aibhinn bith ar B[i]nn Etair.
126a	Oghum consonant sísana [...].
140a	Story about Diarmait mac Cerbaill and St. Ciarán at the assembly of Tailtiu
140a	Story about abbot of Drimnagh
140b	Foscél ar Bannscail, story about the temptation of a confessor by a woman
140b	Story of two fellow clerical students
141a	Story of Columba
141a	Story of King Gúaire
141a	Story of the ghost of Mac Craith mac mic in-Lomanaigh
141b	Story about daughter of the son of Tadg úa Cellaigh Maine
141b	Two Legends about St. Moling of Luachair
141b	Story of St. Comgall of Bangor
142a	Story of Brenainnmoccu-Alta
142a	Story of Baithín and St. Columba.
142a	Story of Mochuta and the Devil
142b	Story of David, Solomon and Absalom
142b	Story of Mochuta
142b	Irish Legend of Job
143a	Scribal note dedicated to John Punket and the daughter of the Baron of Galtrim.
143a	Prophetic note
143a	Irish Legend of St. Patrick, King Loegaire's son and Michael the Archangel
143b	Note on tidings, arguments and history: Foilsigter na focail ar tri coraib .i. scél ocus arrumainte ocus (s)tair
143b	Note on a land east of Asia
143b	Comrac Conculaind re Senbecc ("The Combat of Cú Chulainn and Senbecc")
143b	Religious note on repentance
143b	Triad Tri h-inganta Temrach ("The three wonders of Tara")
143b	Irish Legend of Gregory and the widow who laughed at mass
144a	Conclusion to Legend of Solomon
144a	Legend of David and Solomon
144a	Note on a Greek king
144a	Note on pilgrimage of four Irish clerics to Rome
144b	Legend of Emperor Constantine
144b	Note on three gods of Danu.
144b	Beginning of Esnada tige Buchet ("The Songs of Buchet's House"). Cf: f. 122a.

V (fos. 145-154)
folios	Description
145a-146b	Note on Virgin Mary
147a-154b	Irish translation of De miseria humanae conditionis by Pope Innocent (fragment).

== Sources ==
=== Secondary sources ===
- Stokes, Whitley. The Tripartite Life of St. Patrick. London, 1887.
