= Loeg =

Lóeg, Loeg or LoEG can stand for:

- the companion of Cú Chulain, Láeg
- the Alan Moore-penned comic-series The League of Extraordinary Gentlemen

== See also ==
- Loeg Ningloron (The Gladden Fields), a location in J. R. R. Tolkien's Middle-earth
