= The Abbot of Drimnagh =

Medieval Irish story

The Abbot of Drimnagh is a medieval Irish story about an abbot from Drimnagh who is magically transformed into a woman after sleeping on a fairy mound. The abbot then leaves for Crumlin, marries and has seven children, but seven years later returns and is transformed by the same method into a man. The tale is a rare European example of gender-shifting, and has prompted study of its commentary on gender and historic events.

== Plot ==
The Abbot of Drimnagh had finished preparing a large Easter celebration when he went to rest on a hill above the town. When he woke up from his nap, he reached for his sword, only to find a distaff, considered a woman's tool, instead. He realised he was now wearing feminine clothes, with a woman's haircut, and his genitals had been transformed as well.

An ugly woman then passed him, asking what the maiden was doing sleeping alone on the hill near nightfall. The abbot was tearful as he said he wasn't sure what he would do, because his people would disown him, and that he must now wander the world. He claimed God must have transformed him even though he had never wronged anyone. After wishing the ground would swallow him in his hopelessness, the abbot continued to the monastery of Crumlin, to the west of Drimnagh.

Now the Abbot is described as a woman, and she immediately met a tall young man who fell in love with her. He entreated her to have sex, not stopping until they had, and then the man asked her where she was from and who she was. She told him she would never say, so the man told her that he was the erenagh of Crumlin, and was a widower. He asked her to marry him, and they lived together for seven years, where she bore seven children.

One day, the community of Drimnagh invited the erenagh to an Easter celebration, and their family went back to Drimnagh. She immediately fell asleep on the same hill she had first slept on, while the family continued to the monastery. She awoke to find she had been transformed back into a man, and now bemoaned her new predicament. Finally, he then went back to his original house, to see his wife, and he told the story to his household. Nobody believed him, because to them, he had been gone less than an hour.

The abbot was finally able to prove his story, and their household and the erenagh's reached an agreement. They decided to split the children between the households, with the seventh child made the foster-son of the erenagh's.

== Versions ==
=== Medieval texts ===
Five late medieval manuscripts record the story: MS Egerton 1781, MS Additional 30512, MS Rawlinson B 512, MS 236, and the Book of Fermoy. These works documented the tale around the 15th and 16th centuries.

Kuno Meyer published the story in the 1907 first volume of Anecdota From Irish Manuscripts, as "Story of the Abbot of Druimenaig, who was changed into a woman." He used the MS Additional 30512 and Book of Fermoy versions as sources. This version of the tale has been used for much later analyses.

=== Oral traditions ===
In the present day, the story continues to be told as a folk tale in Gaelic Scotland and Ireland, matching closely to the written version of the story in medieval times.

Barbara Hillers labels the story as a version of a motif she calls The Man Who Becomes a Woman. She identifies similar tales across Scotland and Ireland, including modern oral traditions. Four modern Scottish tales, inserted into the tale of The Man Who Had No Story, center around a similar transformation. The Scottish protagonist is sent to retrieve a bailer from a boat, but in getting in, the boat takes him to Ireland, where he realizes he has now been transformed into a woman. She meets and marries a young man and they have children, but one day at the beach she sees the boat again, and she gets in and is taken back to Scotland. She is transformed back into a man, and when he enters his house, people say he has barely been gone.

== Analysis ==
=== Role of gender ===
The use of gendered pronouns in the story is systematic and has been proposed for discussion. The abbot is described using masculine pronouns, until the end of his state of confusion and grief following his transformation. From then on, she is described using feminine pronouns, until she again is transformed and has finished grieving the change, upon which he is described with masculine pronouns again.

The abbot's strong sense of panic and revulsion upon the initial transformation may be rooted in misogyny or gender dysphoria.

The gender transformation has been interpreted as an obvious punishment for the abbot's transgression, because of his resulting loss of status and power in a traditional Gaelic society that prioritised men. However, the story doesn't clearly cast the abbot's transformation from a woman back into a man as a reward, because the abbot is initially distraught to be transformed again. Hillers suggests this adds some nuance to traditional tellings of the power of gender. The story is also daring because it compels audience members of any gender to imagine gender change.

Tadhg Ó Síocháin analyzes the tale's gender commentary further in The case of the Abbot of Drimnagh: a medieval Irish story of sex-change. He argues that the abbot may actually have desired to become a woman all along, due to the abbot's eventually enthusiastic embrace of his transformation while maintaining his original identity. He also notes that the original description of the abbot is quite gender-neutral, except for its inclusion of his sword, and this could imply a commentary on gender's social construction.

==== Gender transformation motif ====
Hillers says that gender-shifting is an uncommon motif in European folklore, and there is only one internationally standardised motif concerning this: ATU 514, "The Shift of Sex". However, this involves a girl transforming into a boy after enacting a masculine role, and treats the change in sex as a reward because society grants higher status to men. Hillers identifies Irish tales that fit this motif, all told as baptismal transformations: miracles from St Abbán, St Gerald, and St Brendan, as well as a genealogy record recording the transformation of a youth named Loingsech. She identifies modern Gaelic stories that fit the motif, but cannot find examples of this originating in the English language or from other parts of Western Europe.

Academics have compared the tale to stories from other cultures that involve the same motif of men shifting into women and back. Robin Flower compares the tale to The Rose of Bakawali, an Indian romance. Hillers also compares the story to the Greek myth of Tiresias. Ó Síocháin compares the tale to similar Balochi and Arabic tales.

=== Tropes ===
The story has strong elements of fairy legends: Henri Gaidoz argued that the hill and ugly woman are markers of the presence of fairies, and Hillers added that the sacred season and collapsible time of the tale also evince fairies. Hillers says that the abbot likely transgressed when he slept alone on a fairy hill at a sacred time of year past sunset, making him cross a threshold between worlds and leading to his transformation.

Ó Síocháin says the story is characterised by many types of liminality, across gender, sexuality, and worlds. This focus on thresholds is a common theme in medieval Irish literature.

=== Political satire ===
The original Irish places are Druimenaig and Croimglenn, and have been identified as the modern-day Dublin suburbs of Drimnagh and Crumlin.

The story can be read as an allegory for the two monasteries of Drimnagh and Crumlin, satirizing political events between them. In this interpretation, stereotypes of feminine and masculine imagery are used to show how Drimnagh has voluntarily submitted itself to the militarism of Crumlin. The seven children may represent churches spread from these abbacies.
