= Bruiden =

Location of the known bruidne on a map of Ireland

In Gaelic Ireland, a bruiden (Old Irish pronunciation: [ˈbɾuðʲenʲ]) was a building offering shelter, drink and food, often translated as "hostel", "banqueting hall" or "inn."

A description in The Tale of Mac Da Thó's Pig (c. AD 800) describes one bruiden: "There were seven doors in each hall, seven roads through it, and seven fireplaces therein. There were seven cauldrons, with an ox and a salted pig in each. The person, who came that way would thrust the fleshfork into the cauldron, and whatever he obtained with the first thrust he ate, and if he did not obtain anything with the first thrust he ate nothing."

The host (brugaid) was required to show "welcome to all" and "refusal to none."

== List ==
According to The Tale of Mac Da Thó's Pig, there were five or six major bruidne in Ireland:

- Bruiden Dá Derga (Berga), located in the kingdom of Cualu; usually placed on the River Dodder or at Stackallen, County Meath. Featured in the famous poem Togail Bruidne Dá Derga (The Destruction of Da Derga's Hostel)
- Bruiden Forgaill Manaich, located at Rathmooney, near to Lusk, County Dublin.
- Bruiden Dá Réo (Bruiden Mic Cecht Da Réo, Dareo, Bruiden dá Ger), located in West Bréifne (County Leitrim)
- Bruiden Dá Choca (Coga), at Breenmore Hill (Bryanmore), near Athlone ("in a district which belongs to Meave and Ailill"); featured in the story of Togail Bruidne Da Chocae (The Destruction of Da Choca's Hostel)
- Bruiden Dá Thó, in Laigin, believed to lie in the south of County Carlow (possibly Ballyknockcrumpin)

However, Fled Bricrenn (8th century) mentions the briuga Bricriu Nemthenga ("Poison-tongue").

Bruiden Blai Brugad or Bruiden Brúadaig is another, located in Ulaid, hosted by Blai. Bruiden of Moda Minadhmadadh is another.

The idea of having six bruidne may have been chosen to mirror the six "cities of refuge" in the Hebrew Bible.

Sean's Bar in Athlone is located in a building parts of which have been dated to c. AD 900, with wattle and wicker walls. Located near a crossing-point on the River Shannon, it claims to be Ireland's oldest pub and may be the site of an ancient bruiden.

== See also ==
- Hall
- Irish pub
- Termonn
