= Erc mac Cairpri =

Erc mac Cairpri (modern spelling: Earc) is a character from the Ulster Cycle of Irish mythology. His is the son of Cairbre Nia Fer, king of Tara, and his wife Fedelm Noíchrothach, daughter of Conchobar mac Nessa, king of Ulster. After Cairbre is killed by the Ulster hero Cúchulainn in the battle of Ros na Ríg, Erc is installed as the new king of Tara, is given Cúchulainn's daughter Fínscoth in marriage, and swears allegiance to his grandfather Conchobar. However he later conspires with Lugaid mac Con Roí and others to kill Cúchulainn. He is then killed by Conall Cernach, Cúchulainn's foster-brother, in vengeance. When Conall takes his head back to Tara, his sister Achall dies of grief.
