= Cúscraid =

Cúscraid (Irish: Cúscraid Mend Macha; var. Cumscraid) (pronunciation guides: /'ku:skrid m'eN 'maxa / (Maier 1997) /cŏŏs'crĭ/ (Cross & Slover 1936) /KOOS-kridh/ (Paddy Brown)) known by the epithet Mend Macha (the "stammerer" or "inarticulate one" of Macha), is a son of Conchobar mac Nessa in the Ulster Cycle of Irish mythology.

When he first took arms he led a foray against Connacht. He was met on the border by the Connacht hero Cet mac Mágach, who wounded him in the throat (or tip of the tongue) with a spear, giving him his speech impediment.

The three most popular heroes with the women of Ulster were Cúscraid, Cúchulainn and Conall Cernach. The women imitated the peculiarity of the hero they loved the most: Cúscraid's fans stammered, Conall's crooked their necks, and Cúchulainn's squinted one eye in imitation of his warp spasm.

After Conchobar's death, the Ulstermen invited his eldest son Cormac Cond Longas to succeed him as king of Ulster, but Cormac was killed before he could take the throne. It was then offered to Conall Cernach, who refused, recommending his foster-son Cúscraid instead, and Cúscraid became king.
