= Mindball =

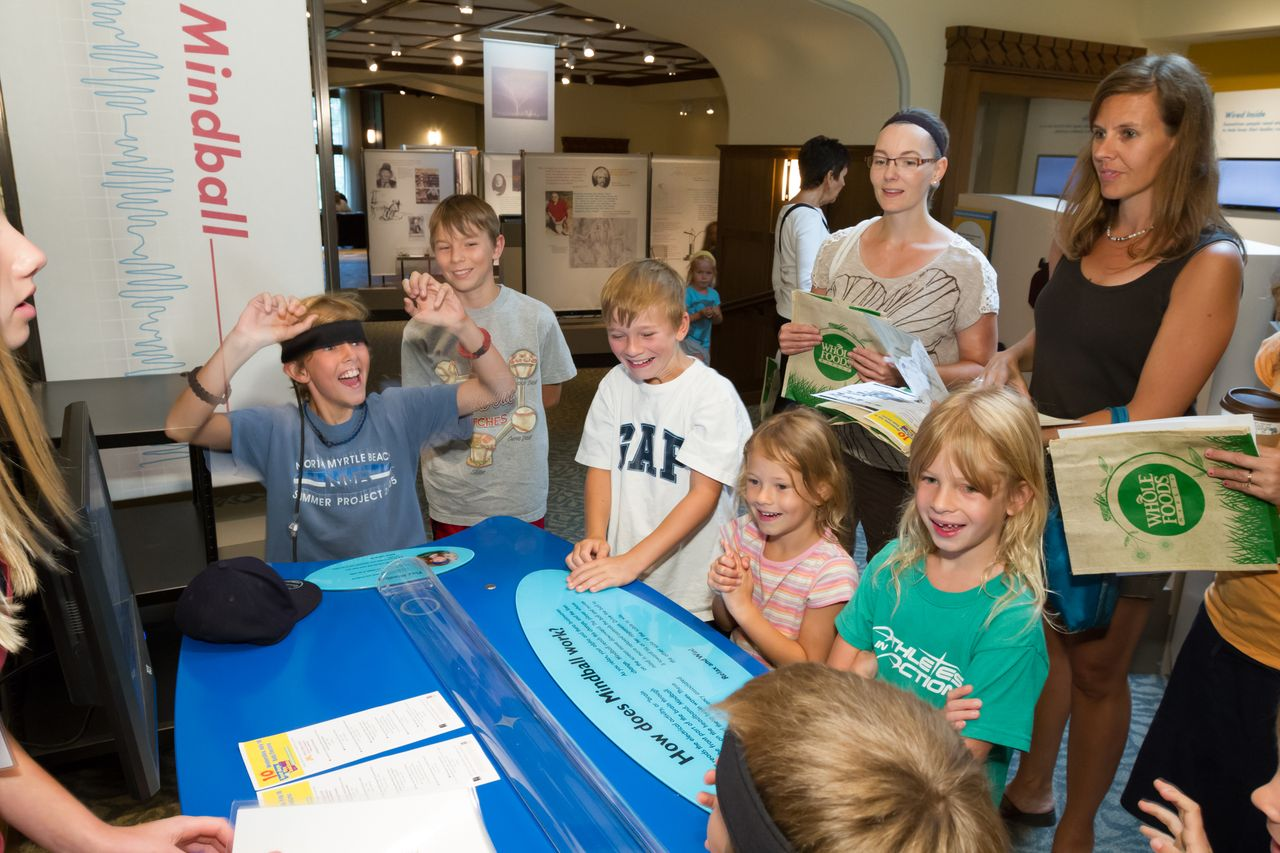
Mindball at The Bakken.

Mindball is created by the Swedish developer Interactive Productline IP AB.

The technique is based on EEG methodology and the basic concept is to move a ball with your mind; Mindball.

Mindball can refer to both the Mindball Game and Mindball Play, both are developed and distributed by Interactive Productline IP AB.

== History ==
The first classic Mindball Game was delivered 2003. More than 260 tables are now found, primarily at Science Centers, all over the world. An Early Access version of Mindball Play was launched on Steam December 1, 2016. The full version was launched in 2018.

Similar games have been developed featuring biofeedback, a concept similar to neurofeedback used by Mindball. In 1974, the game Will Ball was developed featuring a premise similar to Mindball though only using biofeedback.

== Mindball Game (Table Game) ==
The classic Mindball Game is a physical table where the players are sitting opposite to each other wearing wired headbands with sensors that picks up the brain signals. On the table top there is a ball rolling back and forth depending on players level of focus. The player who is most focused and relaxed will have their ball score the opponents goal and win.

== Mindball Play (Video Game) ==
The Mindball Play is a video game created for the consumer market. The full version of the game was launched on Steam July 11, 2018, there are power ups and other features.

== Gameplay ==
Mindball Play is a racing game where players control and compete with their own customized ball.

=== Tracks ===
There are 15 playable tracks in Mindball Play 1.0. Some tracks focus solely on racing with banked turns and sharp drops, others also contain a number of obstacles like deadly laser beams and puddles of slippery oil.

=== Modes of gameplay ===
Mindball Play has several different modes of gameplay:

- Single Player
  - Time Trial
  - Custom races
  - Campaign mode with challenges
- Multiplayer
  - Online (up to 20 players)
  - LAN (up to 20 players)
  - Split screen (up to 4 players)

=== Controllers ===
Mindball Play has several available options for input and can be played with:

- Brain signals via an EEG headband (Muse and BrainLink)
- Keyboard
- Gamepad
- Tobii Eye Tracker

The brain sensing headband

The brain sensing headband measures the players brain waves with EEG technology.

The more focused the player is, the more control they have over their ball.

There are two playable options:

- Play with the headband alone. The ball will follow it's AI while you are focused.
- Play with the headband and any other input mode. The game will listen to your other control when you are focused.

=== Features ===
- Power-ups Power-ups is an optional feature often used in multiplayer. Power-up items are obtained by driving into a box laid out on the course. The power up is then used by the player at will (unless the player pick up a new power up before the current one is used).
- Time trial leaderboards for each track
- AI-opponents An available option in single player mode is to race the ghost-balls of top players from the time trial leaderboard.
- Customization of ball Each player can customize skin and color of their own ball.
- Steam Achievements The Early Access version of Mindball Play has 32 available steam achievements to date.

== See also ==
- Comparison of consumer brain–computer interfaces
