= Cairbre Nia Fer =

King of Tara from the Laigin according to medieval Irish legend and historical tradition

Cairbre Nia Fer (also Corpri, Coirpre, Cairpre; Nioth Fer, Niafer, Niaper), son of Rus Ruad, was, according to medieval Irish legend and historical tradition, a King of Tara from the Laigin.

The earliest reference to Cairbre is in Tírechán's Memoir of Saint Patrick, a 7th-century Latin text found in the Book of Armagh. Patrick finds an enormous grave and raises its giant occupant from the dead. The giant says he was killed by the sons of Mac Con during the reign of Cairbre Nia Fer, a hundred years previously – i.e. in the 4th century. Another early reference is in the annotations to the 7th-century Amra Choluim Chille (eulogy of Colm Cille) by Dallán Forgaill. Here, the saint's mother Eithne is said to be a descendant of Cairbre, and Cairbre a descendant of Cathair Mór.

The 11th century Lebor Gabála Érenn places him during the reign of the High King Eterscél, which it synchronises his reign with that of the Roman emperor Augustus (27 BC - AD 14) and the birth of Christ, and makes him a contemporary of the provincial kings Conchobar mac Nessa of the Ulaid, Cú Roí of Munster and Ailill mac Máta of Connacht. Mac Con of the Dáirine, placed a generation before Cairbre by Tírechán, is dated many generations after him, to the late 2nd century, in the Lebor Gabála, while Cathair Mór, his ancestor in the Amra Choluim Chille, is placed many generations later.

Alongside Conchobar, Cú Roí and Ailill, Cairbre appears as king of Tara in stories of the Ulster Cycle, where he is the brother of Ailill mac Máta, husband of Medb of Connacht. His wife is Fedelm Noíchrothach, daughter of Conchobar, and they have a son, Erc, and a daughter, Achall. In Cath Ruis na Ríg ("The Battle of Rosnaree"), he and his brother Find mac Rossa, king of the Gailióin of Leinster, fight a battle against Conchobar and the Ulaid. The Ulaid hero Cúchulainn kills him with a spear from distance, then decapitates him before his body hits the ground.

It is then that Cuchulain sought for the armies and for Cairpre Nia Fer. And he went against him, and brought shield against shield to him, and brought hand against hand and face against face.
It is then that Cairpre Nia Fer plied his strength upon Cu Chulaind and clasped his two hands about his weapons outside, and launched the cast of a throw [over] the battalions of the Galían.
It is then that Cu Chulaind went through the [battalions] out without bleedings, without wounding [on him].
It is then that Laeg son of Riangabair met him, with the charmed, right-good arms of Cu Chulaind in his hand, namely, the hard-headed Cruadin and the terrifying Duaibsech, that is, his own spear, in his hand.
He waved and brandished it, he shook and adjusted it, and he launched a cast of a throw of it from him then towards Cairpre Nia Fer, so that it pitched in his breast and in his bosom, and pierced his heart in his chest, and cleft his back in two.
His body had not reached ground, when Cu Chulaind made a spring towards it and cut his head off him.
And he shook his [Cairpre's] head towards the armies then.

After the Ulaid win the battle, Cairbre's son Erc swears allegiance to Conchobar, marries Cúchulainn's daughter Finnscoth, and becomes king of Tara in his father's place.

Erc is later part of the conspiracy to kill Cúchulainn. After avenging Cúchulainn, Conall Cernach brings Erc's head back to Tara, where Achall dies of grief for her brother.
