= Elizabeth Scala =

American medievalist

Elizabeth Scala is a Perceval Professor of Medieval Romance, Historiography & Culture at the University of Texas at Austin. A medievalist by training, she specializes in the works of Geoffrey Chaucer, particularly his Canterbury Tales.

In the fall of 2022, a course she offered on the songwriting of Taylor Swift drew global attention, with Scala providing interviews to media outlets such as CNN, Billboard, Newsweek, NPR, BBC Radio 4, the New York Post, and PinkNews. Titled Literary Contexts and Contests: The Taylor Swift Songbook, this course examined Swift's lyrics alongside those of canonical writers like William Shakespeare and Sylvia Plath, as well as Daphne du Maurier's novel Rebecca and Alfred Hitchcock's 1940 filmic adaptation of that novel. Although Swift had earlier been the focus of a New York University course which explored her musical entrepreneurship and celebrity, Scala's emphasis on the literary devices of Swift's songs was among the first sustained efforts to place their lyrics in relation to the Western canon of literature.

Scala's scholarship includes The Canterbury Tales Handbook published by W. W. Norton & Company and Desire in the Canterbury Tales from Ohio State University Press.
