= Liath Macha and Dub Sainglend =

Pair of chariot-horses in Irish mythology

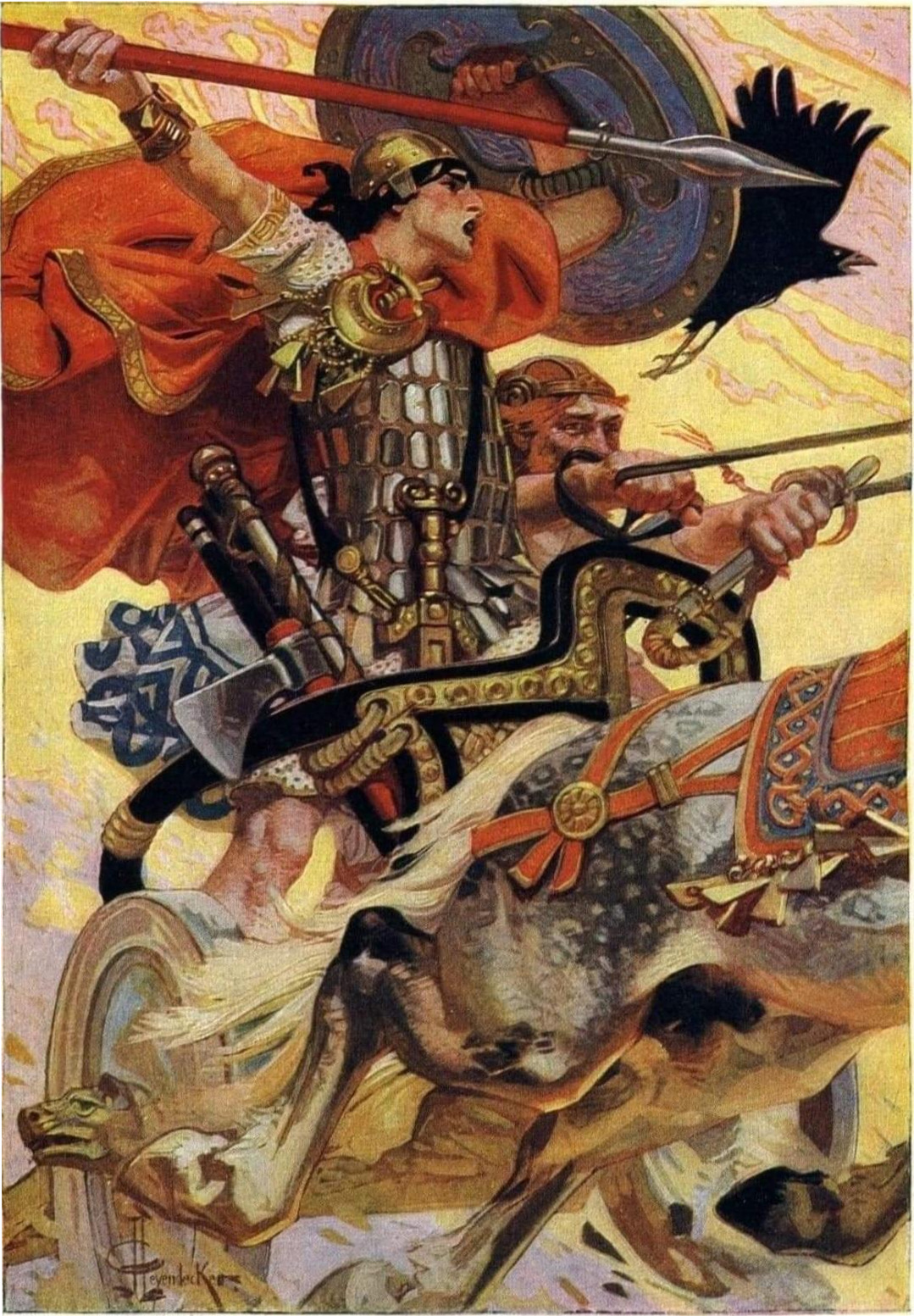
Art of Cú Chulainn in battle (J. C. Leyendecker, 1911); Liath Macha is partially visible.

Liath Macha ("grey [horse] of Macha") and Dub Sainglend ("black [horse] of Saingliu") are the two chariot-horses of Cúchulainn in the Ulster Cycle of Irish mythology.

Both horses appear to Cúchulainn from the pool of Linn Liaith in the mountains of Sliab Fuait, a gift from either Macha or her sister the Morrígan. Cúchulainn leaps onto their backs, and they run around Ireland for a day but cannot throw him off, after which they were tame.

On the day of Cúchulainn's death, as his enemies gathered for battle, Liath Macha refuses to allow Láeg, Cúchulainn's charioteer, to harness him to the chariot. He only relents for Cúchulainn himself, but weeps tears of blood. He is hit by the second spear thrown by Lugaid mac Con Roí (the first had killed Láeg), and returns to the pool of Linn Liaith in the mountains of Sliab Fuait, where Cúchulainn had originally found him. The sons of Calatin had prophesied to Lugaid before he threw each spear that it would kill a king. When he challenges them each time, they respond that he had killed the king of charioteers and the king of horses. Dub Sainglend continues to pull the chariot, but Lugaid's third spear hit Cúchulainn, who falls out of the chariot. Dub Sainglend runs on, but Liath Macha returns to protect him, killing fifty with his teeth and thirty with each of his hooves. After Cúchulainn dies, Liath Macha leads Conall Cernach to his master's body. Conall, aided by his horse the Dewy or Dripping Red (Deirg nDruchtaig) later avenges Cúchulainn by killing Lugaid.

== See also ==
- List of fictional horses
