= Brain balls =

Stone-like balls in Irish legend

In Irish history and legend, brain balls (Irish: liathróidí inchinne) are small stone-like balls claimed to have been made from the heads or brains of enemies. No examples that modern analysis confirms as human have survived.

== Description ==
=== In literature and legend ===
In Geoffrey Keating's 17th century Foras Feasa ar Éirinn (or 'History of Ireland') in 'An Account of the Death of Connor, King of Ulster' he records the background of the tradition, and a Christianised tale relating to it. According to Keating it was the custom during the period described in the Ulster Cycle for a victorious champion to take the brains of a defeated adversary, and make a ball of them, by mixing it with lime, followed by drying in the sun - such a ball was displayed at important events. In the story told by Keating, two fools in the court of king Conchobar mac Nessa (Connor son of Ness) decided to steal such a brain ball, being from the head of Mesgegra, former king of Leinster - having stolen it the fools then began to play with it. Whilst doing so they were discovered by Cet mac Mágach of the kingdom of Connacht, he then took the brain ball from the fools. Later the provinces of Connacht and Ulster became at war, and Cet used the ball as a sling stone, wounding Connor grievously in the head - this began the fulfillment of a prophecy that Mesgegra would be revenged on Ulster after his death - King Connor's doctors advised that extreme stress of exertion might open the ball's wound and kill him, and so he lived carefully for seven years. However one day an eclipse occurred and Connor sought his druid on its cause - he was informed that the cause was the murder of Jesus by the Jews - Connor became incensed by this news, and this caused the wound to re-open, bringing about his death. Keating notes that Connor died before the death of Jesus, and gives the explanation that the druid must have prophesied Jesus's death.

=== Archaeological evidence ===
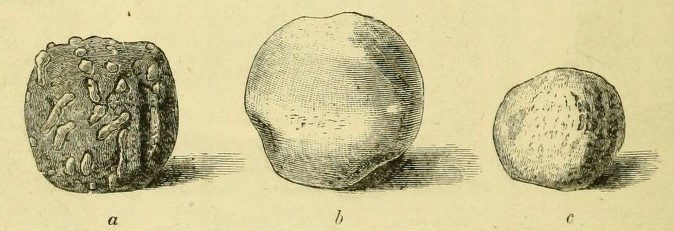
(left) Coralline ball, (center and right) proposed Brain balls, rightmost is heavily worn. From Conwell's Discovery of the tomb of Ollamh Fodhla, p.62

In Irish dolmens balls have been fairly common finds, often found in the structure's floor or lower level detritus, and often associated with bones - materials identified as forming the balls include marble (thought to be a slingshot); ironstone; calcium carbonate; porphyry; and syenite - with sizes recorded were from approximately 0.75 to 3 inches (19 to 76 mm). Some of the balls found inside dolmen cairns in the region of Slieve na Calliagh in the County of Meath were claimed by E.A. Conwell to be 'brain balls' as described in historical sources and legend.

Amongst stone balls discovered in the tombs in Meath Conwell also uncovered some which were initially soft, when discovered in the earth, but hardened on drying out after which it became possible to excavate them. He identified several in two tombs as being 'brain balls'. Of these several had been worn down to a smaller size, but he identified one as being better preserved.

William Frederick Wakeman also found objects he ascribed to be 'brain balls' in a tomb in Old Connacht, Bray. Wakemen submitted a sample for analysis - the ball was approximately 1.5 inches (38 mm) diameter, light yellowish, and friable, containing some harder material. The harder pieces were thought to be splinters of long bones and or vegetable charcoal on inspection under a microscope. The main body of the ball was made of amorphous cement, which gave an analysis of primarily calcium carbonate, plus calcium phosphate plus traces of iron. The analysis concluded that they were man made, but too soft to be used as weapons, and furthermore did not resemble 'brain balls' made from lime with varying proportions of sheep's brain and or powdered bone. Wakeman came to the conclusion that these balls were coprolites.

== Similar balls in Irish legends ==
Sling shot balls made for a special purpose were known as caer-clis ('feat ball') or uball-clis ('feat apple')—they were made in a special way or with certain ingredients. An example is the tathlum made by the Tuatha Dé Danann from the "blood of toads, bears, and vipers, mixed up with sea-sand and hardened" - this ball was used by Lugh to kill Balor.

== See also ==
- Carved stone balls
