= Bricriu =

Figure in Irish mythology

Bricriu (also Briccriu, Bricne) is a hospitaller (briugu), troublemaker and poet in the Ulster Cycle of Irish mythology.

== Fled Bricrenn ==
The story of Fled Bricrenn ("The Feast of Bricriu") tells how he once held a lavish feast for Conchobar mac Nessa and the heroes of Ulster in his house at Dún Rudraige (modern Dundrum, County Down), but knowing his reputation the Ulstermen had to be threatened to attend. First Bricriu threatened to set the Ulster warriors at odds with each other, then to set father against son and mother against daughter, but the Ulstermen finally agreed to come when he threatened to set the two breasts of each Ulster woman beating against each other.

At the feast he promised the "champion's portion" to Cú Chulainn, then to Conall Cernach, then to Lóegaire Búadach, and the three heroes proceeded to compete for the honour. Challenges were set, some judged by Ailill and Medb of Connacht, some by Cú Roí of Munster. At every test set Cú Chulainn came out top, but neither Conall nor Lóegaire would accept the decision.

Finally Cú Roí, disguised as a giant churl, challenged each of the three to behead him, then allow him to return and behead them in return. Only Cú Chulainn passed this test, and was judged worthy of the champion's portion. (Two motifs in this story, the champion's portion and the beheading challenge, are mentioned by the Greek writer Posidonius as practices of the ancient Celts. The beheading challenge is also central to the Middle English Arthurian poem Sir Gawain and the Green Knight.)

== Other ==
Bricriu followed Fergus mac Róich into exile in Connacht following the Deirdre affair. While he was a guest at Cruachan he caused a lot of trouble for Fergus and another lover of his, Flidais, which culminated at the Táin Bó Flidhais. In the Echtra Nerai, Bricriu mocks the singing of Fergus, comparing it to a bull-calf's bellowing. Fergus strikes him with 5 fidchell pieces, injuring him severely. Later, Bricriu recovered but died at Cruachan at the end of the Táin Bó Cuailnge (Cattle Raid of Cooley), trampled to death by the two bulls as they fought.

Fled Bricrenn is preserved in the near-contemporary Leabhar na h-Uidhri (The Book of the Dun Cow) and in four later manuscripts.

The name of the village of Loughbrickland, near Banbridge, County Down, is thought to derive from Irish Loch Briccrend or Bricriu's Lake, where he was a chieftain and lived in the 'Watery Fort' (ringfort) overlooking the loch.

== See also ==
- Fled Bricrenn
- Mesca Ulad
- Irish mythology in popular culture: Bricriu
