= Fedelm Noíchrothach =

Female figure in Irish mythology

Fedelm Noíchrothach ("nine times beautiful"), also known as Fedelm Noíchride ("nine-hearts" or "fresh-heart"), is a daughter of Conchobar mac Nessa in the Ulster Cycle of Irish mythology. She married Cairbre Nia Fer, king of Tara, but was unfaithful to him. She enjoyed a tryst with Cúchulainn at the beginning of the Táin Bó Cuailnge (Cattle Raid of Cooley), although the text has been clumsily altered to say that Cúchulainn's lover was Fedelm's handmaid. She later left her husband for Conall Cernach.
