= Cet mac Mágach =

Mythological warrior from Ireland

Cet mac Mágach is a Connacht warrior in the Ulster Cycle of Irish Mythology. He had a rivalry with the Ulster warrior Conall Cernach. In some versions, he is said to be the brother of Conall's mother, making him Conall's uncle.

== Sources ==
An account of Cet's death appears in a single manuscript of the Book of Leinster, known as the Edinburgh manuscript. This account was published for the first time, with a translation, as "The Death of Cet mac Mágach", by Kuno Meyer, in 1906.

Cet appears in another death tale, "The Death of Conchobar", in which he uses the brain of Mesgegra to kill Conchobar mac Nessa. This story is found, with some variations, in at least five manuscripts.

He also appears in the story of Mac Dá Thó's pig. This story appears in manuscripts held at Trinity College, Dublin and the Bodleian Library, Oxford, and has been published and translated several times.

== Plot summaries ==
=== The story of Mac Dá Thó's pig ===
At a feast at the house of Mac Dá Thó, a hospitaller of Leinster, the warriors of Connacht and Ulster competed for the champion's portion by boasting of their deeds. Cet shamed all comers by reminding them how he had bested them in combat. However, just as Cet was about to carve, Conall Cernach arrived. Conall's boasts topped even Cet's. Cet admitted defeat, but claimed that if his brother Anlúan were present, his feats would top even Conall's. Conall responded by tossing him Anlúan's freshly severed head.

=== The death of Conchobar ===
Cet killed Conchobar mac Nessa, king of Ulster. He stole the calcified brain of Mesgegra, king of Leinster, which Conall Cernach had taken as a trophy of battle, and shot it from his sling, embedding it in Conchobar's head. Conchobar's doctors couldn't remove it without killing him, so they sewed up the wound and told him he would survive as long as he didn't get excited or over-exert himself. Seven reasonably peaceful years later Conchobar was told of the death of Christ. He flew into a rage, the brain burst from his head, and he died.

=== The death of Cet mac Mágach ===
Cet made a raid on Ulster one winter's day, killing twenty-seven men and taking their heads. It had snowed, so Conall Cernach was able to follow his trail. He caught up with him, but was reluctant to face him until his charioteer chided him for cowardice. They met at a ford, and Conall killed Cet in a ferocious combat that left Conall near to death himself.

== See also ==
- Brain balls
