= Curadmír =

The Curadmír, modern Curadhmhír (Champion's Portion) was an ancient custom referred to in early Irish literature, whereby the warrior acknowledged as the bravest present at a feast was given precedence and awarded the choicest cut of meat. This was often disputed violently. The custom appears most often in the legends of the Ulster Cycle. It is parallelled by historical customs of the ancient Celts of continental Europe, as recorded by classical writers.

== The Story of Mac Dá Tho's Pig ==
The Ulster Cycle saga Scéla Mucce Meic Dá Thó ("The Story of Mac Dá Tho's Pig") features a dispute over the Champion's Portion between warriors of Ulster and Connacht who are guests at a feast in Leinster. They dispute it by boasting of their previous heroic deeds, and eventually the Connacht hero Cet mac Mágach is acknowledged as the bravest man present. Just as he is about to carve the pig, the Ulster hero Conall Cernach arrives, and his boasts force Cet to give way to him. But he claims that Conall would have had to give way to his brother Anlúan had he been there. Conall responds by tossing Cet Anlúan's freshly severed head. Conall carves the pig, but gives the Connachtmen such a small portion that battle breaks out between them.

== Fled Bricrenn ==
Another Ulster Cycle saga which involves the Curadmír is Fled Bricrenn ("Bricriu's Feast"). The notorious troublemaker Bricriu invites the Ulstermen to a feast. Before it starts he visits three heroes, Cúchulainn, Conall Cernach and Lóegaire Búadach, privately, and advises each of them to claim the Champion's Portion, which at this feast includes not only a roast boar but also a cauldron of wine and a hundred cakes of wheat baked in honey. All three stand up to claim it, and fighting nearly breaks out. To avoid violence the Champion's Portion is shared out among the Ulstermen, and Ailill and Medb, king and queen of Connacht, and then Cú Roí of Munster, are asked to judge the dispute. A series of tests of skill and courage are set, and after each of them Cúchulainn is judged to have won, but Conall and Lóegaire refuse to accept the judgement, and the Champion's Portion goes unawarded. Then, when the three heroes are at Emain Macha, they are visited by a giant churl who challenges them each in turn to behead him, and then allow him to behead them the following day. Lóegaire, Conall and Cúchulainn all behead the churl, who picks up his head and leaves, but Lóegaire and Conall are nowhere to be found when he returns the following day. Only Cúchulainn keeps his side of the bargain. He stretches out his neck for the axe, but the churl spares him in recognition of his courage and honour. He reveals himself as Cú Roí, and announces that the Champion's Portion is indisputably Cúchulainn's.

== Classical references ==
Athenaeus, quoting the lost work of the 1st/2nd century BC Greek historian and geographer Posidonius, says that it was formerly the custom among the Celts for the hind quarter of pork to be claimed by the bravest man, and disputes over who this was would be settled by single combat to the death. Diodorus Siculus also says that the Celts gave the best joints of meat to the most distinguished men.

== In fiction ==
- In the 2000 AD comic book Slaine the King, two warriors from Slaine's tribe fight over the hero's portion. Gwalchazad the Ram eventually stabs Dundan Skullsmasher with his knife.
- A less violent quarrel over the hero's portion is featured in Asterix in Belgium. The two Belgian chiefs threaten to settle their differences with fists, until an equally large portion of meat is brought out.
