= Lóegaire Búadach =

Character in Irish mythology

In the Ulster Cycle of Irish mythology, Lóegaire Búadach (Lóegaire the Victorious) is a Ulster warrior who mainly functions as comic relief. He competed with Cúchulainn and Conall Cernach for the champion's portion at Briccriu's feast. He was also known by the name Lóegaire Bern Búadach, under which he was an ancestor god of the Osraige and owner of a famous sword.

When the poet Aed was to be drowned in a lake near Lóegaire's house for adultery with Conchobar's wife Mugain, Lóegaire rushed out of the house in anger to rescue him. As he leaped out the door, he knocked the top of his own head off on the lintel. Still, he managed to kill thirty soldiers and save Aed's life before he died.

== Texts ==
- Bricriu's Feast
- The Death of Lóegaire Búadach
