= Conall Cernach =

Hero in the Ulster Cycle of Irish mythology

Conall Cernach (modern spelling: Conall Cearnach) is a hero of the Ulaid in the Ulster Cycle of Irish mythology. He had a crooked neck and is said to have always slept with the head of a Connachtman under his knee. His epithet is normally translated as "victorious" or "triumphant", although it is an obscure word, and some texts struggle to explain it. Alternative meanings include "angular, having corners", "swollen", or "possessing a dish or receptacle". The original form of the name "Conall" in Ogham inscriptions was Cunavalas.

== Legendary biography ==
=== Physical description ===
In the destruction of Da Derga's Hostel, Conall Cernach is described as follows:

"I saw a man there in an ornamented dining compartment, who was the fairest of the warriors of Ireland. A fleecy crimson cloak about him. As white as the snow one of the cheeks on him, as freckled-red as the foxglove the other cheek. One of his two eyes is as blue as a hyacinth, as black as a beetle’s back the other eye. The measure of a reaping basket his bushy tree (of) fair, very blond (hair) that is on him. It strikes the edge of his two hips. It is as fleecy as a tufted ram. Though a sack of bountiful (?) red nuts were poured out over the top of his head, not a nut of them would fall to the ground. A goldhilted sword in his hand. A blood-red shield, dotted with rivets of white metal (tincopper alloy) between plates of gold. A long, three-ridged spear, as thick as an outer yoke (of a miller’s team?) the shaft that is on it."

=== Birth ===
He was born c. 50 BC. His father was Amairgin mac Echit and his mother was Findchoem. His parents' marriage was barren, until Findchoem visited a druid and was advised to drink from a certain well. She took a drink from the well, swallowing a worm with it, and became pregnant. Findchoem's brother Cet mac Mágach, a Connachtman, protected his sister until she gave birth to a son, Conall. Druids came to initiate the child into their religion, and prophesied that he would kill more than half of the men of Connacht, and that he would always have a Connachtman's head on his belt. Cet took the child, put him under his heel and tried to break his neck, but only damaged it, leaving his nephew with a crooked neck.

=== Mac Da Thó's Pig ===
Conall would have a fierce rivalry with his uncle for the rest of his life. He shamed Cet at a feast at the house of Mac Dá Thó, a hospitaller of Leinster, when the warriors of Connacht and Ulster competed for the champion's portion by boasting of their deeds. Cet reminded all comers how he had bested them in combat, including emasculating Celtchar with his spear. However, just as Cet was about to carve, Conall arrived, and his boasts topped even Cet's. Cet admitted defeat, but claimed that if his brother Anlúan were present, his feats would top even Conall's. Conall responded by tossing him Anlúan's freshly severed head.

=== Bricriu's Feast ===
He also competed for the champion's portion at a feast held by the troublemaker Bricriu, albeit with less success. Bricriu went in turn to Conall, Lóegaire Búadach and Cú Chulainn, and promised each of them the champion's portion. When the feast started each of the three warriors' charioteers stood up and claimed the champion's portion for his master. A fight broke out between Conall, Láegare and Cú Chulainn, until King Conchobar, Fergus and Sencha intervened to separate them. Meanwhile, Bricriu went to each of the three heroes' wives - Conall's wife Lendabair, Lóegaire's wife Fedelm, and Cú Chulainn's wife Emer - and promised them precedence at the feast, and when the women approached, Conall, Lóegaire and Cú Chulainn were almost set to violence again. Emer was the first to enter, as Cú Chulainn lifted the side of the house up to let her in, tipping Bricriu into a ditch. The Ulstermen asked first Ailill and Medb, king and queen of Connacht, then Cú Roí, king of Munster, to adjudicate the dispute. In every test set, Cú Chulainn came out on top, but neither Conall nor Lóegaire would accept the result. Finally, a hideous, giant churl, carrying a huge axe, appeared at Emain Macha. He challenged each of the three heroes to cut off his head, and then allow him to return the next day to cut off the hero's head. Lóegaire accepted the challenge and cut off the churl's head, and the churl picked up his head and left. He returned the next day, but Lóegaire was nowhere to be seen. Conall was the next to take up the challenge, but he too did not fulfil his side of the bargain. Finally Cú Chulainn cut off the churl's head, and submitted himself to the churl's axe the following day as promised. The churl spared him, revealed himself as Cú Roí, and declared that Cú Chulainn should have the champion's portion undisputed at any feast held by the Ulstermen.

=== Fráech's Cattle Raid ===
He helped the Connacht hero Fráech recover his abducted wife and sons and stolen cattle. They tracked them to Alba (Scotland), southwards through Britain, across the English Channel, through Lombardy, to the Alps, where they met an Irish girl herding sheep. She told them the land was ruled by warriors who stole cattle from far and near, and had recently brought back Fráech's cattle and family. She advised them to go to the woman who tended the cows, who warned them that the fort where Fráech's wife was kept was guarded by a serpent, but promised to leave the gate open for them. When they attacked the fort, the serpent leaped into Conall's belt, and did him no harm. They liberated Fráech's family, took all the cattle and treasure, and went back to Ireland the way they came.

=== Battle of Howth ===
He fought Mes Gedra, king of Leinster, in single combat following a battle provoked by the Ulster poet Athirne. Mes Gedra had lost a hand in an earlier fight, so Conall fought him with one hand tucked into his belt. He won, taking his opponent's head as a trophy. When he put Mes Gedra's head on his shoulder, it straightened his neck. Conall's charioteer couldn't carry the head, so he cut out the brain and preserved it by mixing it with lime. The calcified brain was later stolen by Cet and used to kill Conchobar mac Nessa.

=== Death of Cú Chulainn ===
Conall and Cú Chulainn had sworn to each other that whoever was killed first, the other would avenge him before nightfall. When Lugaid mac Con Roí and Erc mac Cairpri killed Cú Chulainn, Conall pursued them. Lugaid had also lost a hand, and Conall again fought one-handed, but this time he only won when his horse Deirg nDruchtaig (Dewy or Dripping Red) took a bite out of Lugaid's side. He took both their heads, and when he took Erc's head back to Tara his sister, Achall, died of grief.

=== Final showdown with Cet ===
Conall pursued Cet after he had made a raid on Ulster, killing twenty-seven men and taking their heads. It had snowed, so he was able to follow his trail. He caught up with him, but was reluctant to face him until his charioteer chided him for cowardice. They met at a ford, and Conall killed Cet in a ferocious combat that left Conall near to death himself. He was found by Bélchú of Breifne, a Connachtman, who took him home, tended to his wounds, and planned to fight him when he was fit. But Bélchú soon regretted his honourable behaviour and asked his three sons to kill Conall as he lay in his sickbed. Conall overheard and forced Bélchú to take his place in the bed, and when his sons arrived they killed him instead. Conall then killed the three of them and took all four heads home.

=== Later years ===
After Conchobor and his son, Cormac Cond Longas, had been killed, Conall was offered the kingship of Ulster, but he refused it, putting forward instead his foster-son, Conchobar's younger son Cúscraid, who was proclaimed king. In his declining years he contracted leprosy and went to stay with Ailill and Medb of Connacht, who were best placed to look after him, since they had the resources to satisfy his enormous appetite. Ailill was seeing another woman behind Medb's back, so Medb incited Conall to kill Ailill, something he was happy to do as Ailill had killed Fergus mac Róich. Ailill was killed on 1 May, Lá Bealtaine, which was on a Tuesday. Conall fled, but the men of Connacht pursued and killed him at a ford on the following Monday, 7 May. Both oral tradition and old textual sources place this at the town of Ballyconnell, County Cavan.

== Family and genealogy ==
Conall's wife was Lendabair, daughter of Eogain mac Durthacht. He also had other wives, including 1. Aifi, daughter of Bélcu Bréifne whom Conall had slain; 2. Niamh, daughter of Cealtair; 3. Feibe, daughter of Concubur and her son by Conall was Fiaca Fir Feibe; 4. Fedelm Noíchrothach, daughter of Conchobar mac Nessa. She was also the wife of Cairbre Nia Fer, whom she left to go to Conall; 5. Londcaidhe, daughter of Eatach Eachbeoil. Her son by Conall was Irial Glunmar. Unusually for a character from the Ulster Cycle, Conall appears in medieval Irish genealogies as the ancestor of the kings of the Dál nAraidi and the Uí Echach Cobo. The legendary High King Mal mac Rochride was also said to be descended from him.

== Modern Irish folklore ==
In modern Irish folklore, Conall is also an occurring character. Within it he has been conflated with and is told to be a member of the Fianna. One story recounts a tale about how Conall was present at and witnessed the Crucifixion of Jesus.

== Sources ==
Togail Bruidne Dá Derga (Recension II), ed. Eleanor Knott (1936). Togail Bruidne Da Derga. Mediaeval and Modern Irish Series 8. Dublin: DIAS.; tr. Whitley Stokes (1901–1902). "The Destruction of Dá Derga's Hostel". Revue Celtique. 22–3: 9–61, 165–215, 282–329, 390–437 (vol. 22), 88 (vol. 23).

== Texts ==
- The Birth of Cú Chulainn
- Tidings of Conchobar son of Ness
- The wooing of Emer
- The Wooing of Luaine and the Death of Athirne
- The Story of Mac Dathó's Pig
- Bricriu's Feast
- The Boyhood Deeds of Cú Chulainn
- The Sick-bed of Cuchulain, and the only jealousy of Emer
- The Cattle Raid of Fráech
- The Intoxication of the Ulstermen
- The Battle of Howth
- The Battle of Ross na Ríg
- The Death of Cú Chulainn
- The Death of Conchobar
- The Destruction of Da Derga's Hostel
- The Death of Cet mac Mágach
- The Death of Ailill and Conall Cernach
- Achall (from The Metrical Dindshenchas Vol 1)
