= Garb mac Stairn =

Garb mac Stairn (also spelt Garbh, Gharbh, Garibh Mac-Starn, etc.) is a character in late (perhaps 17th century) prose narratives and poetry (duan) of the Ulster cycle; and claims Scandinavian origins, or is represented as a giant from the Eastlands.

He arrives in Ireland demanding tribute, only to be defeated and beheaded by Cúchulainn in a Highland verse account. He also appears as an antagonist in a South Uist folkloric version of the Táin Bó Cúailnge.

In a Highland popular folktale, Garbh Mac Stairn figures as a giant living in the neighborhood, from whom Cuchullin attempts to steal his fine light-coloured bull. Cuchullin impersonates a herd (herdsman) and enters the home, crawls into the bed of Garb's mistress, and she mistakes him for a wee baby.

Garbh mac Starn is also said to be identical to (or be the original model of) the Suaran son of Starno, king of Lochlin, in James Macpherson's works attributed to Ossian.

== Cited texts ==
(References)

- Mackillop, James (1998), Dictionary of Celtic Mythology, Oxford: Oxford University Press, ISBN 0-19-280120-1

(Primary sources)

- Carmichael, Alexander A. (1873), "Toirioc na Taine", Transactions of the Gaelic Society of Inverness, 2 Catalogued by Carmichael Watson Project. This tale was recited by Eachann Mac-iosaig [or MacIssac, erroneously given as 'MacLeod' in the text, a.k.a. "Eachann Mac Ruaraidh", a peasant of Ceannlangabhat, Iochdar, UIst a Chinnes Deas (South Uist), who heard it 60 years before from 'Ruary Rua' MacQuien.
- Campbell, John Francis (1862), Popular tales of the West Highlands (google), vol. 3, Edinburgh: Edmonston and Douglas, p. 194–199, "LXXV. Guaigean Ladhrach 'S Loirean Spagach" (tr. Crumple Toes and Shamble Shanks). Garb appears not in the primary example but in the appended variant, taken down from Neil Macalister, Port Charlotte, Islay, and written by Mr. Carmichael.
  - 1890 edition Sacred Texts)
- Maclean, Hector (1892), Ultonian Hero-ballads Collected in the Highlands and Western Isles of Scotland : from the year 1516, and at successive periods till 1870 (Internet Archive), Glasgow: A. Sinclair: "Duan a' Ghairbh Mhic Stairn", ed., p. 17- "Ballad of the Garve Son of Starn", tr., p. 91- ("An Garbh Mac Stairn is a fusion of two variants, the one in Mac Nicol's collection and the other in Fletcher's collection, both.. in the Advocates' Library")
