= L. Winifred Faraday =

British teacher, writer, and folklorist

L. Winifred Faraday (1872–1948) was a British teacher and folklorist known for her translation of the Irish epic Táin Bó Cúailnge.

Lucy Winifred Faraday was born on 8 July 1872 in Manchester. She studied at the Victoria University of Manchester (Owens College), where she held a University Fellowship and a University Scholarship. She took a First in English Language and Literature, earning her B.A. in 1897 and her M.A. in 1900. Her sister, Ethel Richmond Faraday, also studied at the University of Manchester.

== Life ==
Faraday taught at Howell's School, Llandaff in 1893, and the Manchester High School for Girls starting in 1899, where she was a lecturer in English philology. She also earned her teacher's diploma from the University of Manchester in 1903.

== Work ==
In April 1900, she was the first woman elected to the Manchester Literary and Philosophical Society; the year before, she had been the first woman to have a paper read at the Society ("On the question of Irish influence on early Icelandic literature…," communicated on her behalf by her brother).

She was a member of the Icelandic Society of Copenhagen, and published a number of articles on Icelandic history and folklore. In 1901 and 1902, she produced a two-volume work on the Poetic Edda and the Prose Edda.

Her translation of the Irish epic Táin Bó Cúailnge, published in 1904, was the first English translation based on two early, incomplete versions of the Táin: one contained in a 12th-century manuscript known as Lebor na hUidre, or the Book of the Dun Cow (a version described by the later translator Thomas Kinsella as "a badly flawed and mutilated text"), and another recorded in the 14th-century manuscript Leabhar Buidhe Leacáin, or the Yellow Book of Lecan. (Most other translations have been based on a more complete version in the Book of Leinster.

She died on 13 November 1948.

== Publications ==
- "On the question of Irish influence on early Icelandic literature, illustrated from the Irish MSS. in the Bodleian Library, via the Manchester Literary and Philosophical Society
- The Edda: I. The divine mythology of the North. (1902), via the HathiTrust
- The cattle-raid of Cualnge (Táin Bó Cúailnge): an old Irish prose-epic (1904), via the HathiTrust
