= Louis le Brocquy Táin illustrations =

Illustrated book (Thomas Kinsella retelling)

The Táin
- The Táin, 1969. First edition.
- Author: Thomas Kinsella. Translated from the Irish epic Táin Bó Cúailnge, the central tale in the Ulster Cycle.
- Cover artist: Louis le Brocquy (slipcase with papered boards). Illustrated throughout with 133 black and white lithographic brush drawings.
- Language: English
- Genre: Irish Mythology
- Publisher: Dolmen Editions IX, Dolmen Press, Dublin
- Publication date: 1969
- Publication place: Ireland
- ISBN: 978-0-19-280373-3
- OCLC: 59500985
- Dewey Decimal: 891.6/231 22
- LC Class: PB1397.T3 E513 1970

The Tain illustrations are a series of drawings that illustrated Táin Bó Cúailnge. In 1967 Louis le Brocquy was commissioned by publisher Liam Miller to illustrate Thomas Kinsella's inspired version of the Táin Bó Cúailnge, the record of Ireland's proto-historic past.

Ailbhe Ní Bhriain remarked, "The Táin Bó Cuailnge - táin, meaning the gathering of people for a cattle raid - is a prose epic with verse passages and forms the centrepiece of the cycle of Ulster heroic stories. It tells of the exploits of King Conchobar and his chief warrior Cúchulainn (The Hound of Ulster) and of the invasion of Ulster by Queen Medb of Connacht in an attempt to capture the Brown Bull of Cuailgne." Dating as far back as the 12th century in manuscript form, this legend has been treated both academically by scholars and linguists and romantically by such Revival writers as Yeats and Lady Gregory. The Dolmen Edition of the saga was to give, in Kinsella's words, the first 'living version of the story", a version true to its blunt and brutal Gaelic character.' Louis le Brocquy painted several hundred calligraphic brush drawings over a period of six months retaining 133 illustrations. The artist noted, "Any graphic accompaniment to a story which owes its existence to the memory and concern of a people over some twelve hundred years, should decently be as impersonal as possible. The illustrations of early Celtic manuscripts express not personality but temperament. They provide not graphic comment on the text but an extension of it. Their means are not available to us today - either temperamentally or technically - but certain lessons may be learned from them relevant to the present work. In particular, they suggest that graphic images, if any, should grow spontaneously and even physically from the matter of the printed text. If these images - these marks in printer's ink - form an extension to Thomas Kinsella's Táin, they are a humble one. It is as shadows are thrown by the text that they derive their substance."

== The Táin, 1969 ==
The Táin, (Dolmen Press, Dublin) was published in September 1969. Widely acknowledged as the great Irish Livre d'Artiste of the 20th century, Seamus Heaney writes in The Listener: "The book is illustrated lavishly and magnificently by Louis le Brocquy: 'marks in printer's ink', he calls his contribution, 'shadows are thrown by the text'. Sometimes they are runs, sometimes a rush of brush strokes, sometimes a tall totem in the margin. The remote significance of the story, the bold vigour among the ranks of heroes and the wily, sexual presence of the women are continuously insinuated by the graphic commentary. Altogether the poetry, painting and printing make this an important book, the fulfilment of a publishing dream."

Le Brocquy's illustrations received critical acclaim for their level of interplay with Kinsella's writing. According to Aidan Dunne: "The brush drawings merged seamlessly with the text; stark, fluent images, they expressed with great economy of means an epic breadth, evoking the movement of vast masses of people. Individual participants in the drama were also pulled into close focus. To achieve this, le Brocquy developed his brilliant idiom of calligraphic illustration ... Le Brocquy's achievement lies in having absorbed the general technical possibilities and harnessed them to his own specific ends, and, in the process, having managed to break new ground. The Táin drawings managed a well-nigh perfect marriage of text and image, and their impact was considerable."

Bhriain further observed: "The strong linear quality of le Brocquy's illustrations coheres with the upright, unfussy Pilgrim font, which is also suited to the direct tone of Kinsella's translation. The lettering, or initial letter, plays an important function in the livre d'artiste, and it can be seen here as a strong integrating element, as it is applied to the initial word of each tale. The bold font of the lettering echoes the dense black of le Brocquy's images, creating a fine balance between the literary and the visual symbol. These formal elements make it clear that The Tain is a production of carefully choreographed visual information, one comparable with the unity of Verlaine's language, Bonnard's arabesques, and the floral font in Parallèlement ... In his Tain illustrations, the ability of le Brocquy's drawings to emerge and dissolve gives fitting expression to the peculiar marriage of mysticism and raw physicality contained in Kinsella's text. Like gestures of primaeval fear, strength, or passion, the 'explosive' energy of the brushwork captures the physical exuberance of the text, as can be seen in the images of "bodily matters" and of violence, as in the several drawings of Cúchulainn's 'warp spasm'."

The illustrations establish le Brocquy's reputation as an interpretive draftsman of considerable originality. Kinsella stated, "There are certain staying qualities that help an artist to major achievement. The gift of concentration is one (in the sense of economy as well as of intensity), and so is steady energy. le Brocquy has these qualities to a degree unique among Irish painters or designers since the death of Jack Butler Yeats. He also has that individual force, stemming from tireless curiosity, which gives coherence to a career - the kind of force that insists on artistic growth, or change, and ensures that any stimulus, however seemingly random, find a central response."

== Táin Portfolios ==
The portfolios consist of three different sets of twelve black and white lithographic brush drawings selected from the Táin illustrations - five ‘Individual Subjects’ and four chromo-lithographic ‘Epic Shields’ separate. It is a limited edition of 70 proofs (one artist's proof), each sheet individually signed, dated and numbered by the artist – including portfolio numbers (I, II, & III). It was printed by Frank O’Reilly, Dublin, on Swiftbrook paper, each sheet 54 x 38 cm. It forms a large folio, unbound, with title pages and black interleaves. It is a clamshell, with blackboards stamped in white in a design by the artist.

Exhibited for the first time at the Dawson Gallery, Dublin in October 1969, Brian Fallon writes in The Irish Times: "The Kinsella-Le Brocquy Tåin was a stunner in terms of book production, a triumph for Liam Miller and the Dolmen, and a high-water mark in Irish publishing ... The result is very impressive, I should say one of the very best things Le Brocquy has done. It will be impossible from now on to think of the Irish Iliad in terms of the pseudo-medieval clutter of the old-style illustrations - helmeted warriors laden with "props" and looking rather like understudies for a Wagner opera. Le Brocquy's conception is epic, stark and primitive, at times even sinister (as in the superb "Morrigan"). In an idiom that can take in its stride hints from oriental art, cave painting, Picasso and other sources he has created powerfully and economically an entire mythical-legendary world."

== Kinsella-le Brocquy Táin editions ==
The Táin, Dolmen Edition IX (Dublin: Dolmen Press, 1969). Limited edition of 1,750 copies (incl. 50 Deluxe copies). 133 black and white lithographic brush drawings on paper made by Swiftbrook Paper Mills, County Dublin, reproduced by line block, The National Engraving Company. Printed by Liam Browne, Dolmen Press, Dublin, bound by Hely Thom, Dublin. Designed by Liam Miller, the text appears in fourteen- and ten-point Pilgrim with Perpetua and Felix titles. Tall octavo, black cloth boards, stamped in white in a design by the artist, illustrated dust-jacket. Housed in publisher's slipcase with papered boards illustrated in a design by the artist.

The Táin, Deluxe Edition, Dolmen Edition IX (Dublin: The Dolmen Press, 1969). Limited to 50 numbered copies, signed by author, artist and designer on colophon. 133 black and white lithographic brush drawings on paper specially made by Swiftbrook Paper Mills, County Dublin, reproduced by line block, The National Engraving Company. Printed by Liam Browne, Dolmen Press, Dublin. An extra suit of ‘Warp Spasm’ lithographic brush drawings on three consecutive opening pages. Bound by Desmond Smith, Irish University Press Bindery to a design by Liam Miller. Vermilion oasis Niger goatskin, boards stamped in gold on front and back in a design by the artist. It is housed in a black cloth boxed-case.

The Táin, Hardback trade edition (Oxford/New York: O.U.P., in association with the Dolmen Press Limited, Dublin, 1970). This includes 33 illustrations photographically reduced from the original edition. It is enclosed by black cloth boards, stamped in white in a design by the artist with illustrated dust-jacket.

The Táin, Paperback edition (O.U.P., Oxford/New York, 1972–2007). 30 illustrations retained. Library Edition (Mountrath, Portlaoise: The Dolmen Press, in association with the University Press of Pennsylvania, 1985). 108 illustrations were photographically reduced by 11%. It was printed and bound by Leinster Leader Ltd with black cloth over boards, stamped in white in a design by the artist with illustrated dust-jacket.

== Translations ==
Rinderraub, Susanne Schaup, trans. (Heimeran Verlag, Munich/Rütten & Loening, Berlin in association with the Dolmen Press, 1976). This volume includes one hundred and fourteen full-scale illustrations. Its form is tall octavo, white cloth over boards, stamped in black in a design by the artist with illustrated dust-jacket.

La Razzia, Jean-Philippe Imbert, trans. (Tours: Alfil Editions, 1996). 30 illustrations were retained in this paperback.

El Táin, Pura López Colomé, trans. (Mexico: Smurfit Group, 2001). This comprises fully illustrated hardback and paperback editions.

夺牛记 (The Táin), 托马斯·金塞拉 (Thomas Kinsella),曹波 (Cao Bo) trans. (Beijing: Hunan Education Press & Yingpan Brother Publishing Co., Ltd, 2008). Paperback edition, with 30 illustrations.
