= An Táin =

- Date: 2006
- Publisher: Cló Mhaigh Eo

Creative team
- Writer: Colmán Ó Raghallaigh
- Artist: Barry Reynolds
- Letterer: Roxanne Burchartz
- Colorist: Adrien Merigeau
- Editor: Ross Murray

Original publication
- Language: Irish
- ISBN: 1-899922-28-8

An Táin is an Irish-language graphic novel published by Cló Mhaigh Eo in 2006. Written by Colmán Ó Raghallaigh and illustrated by Barry Reynolds, it adapts the ancient Irish epic Táin Bó Cúailnge ("the cattle-raid of Cooley"). The work won the 2006 Oireachtas na Gaeilge Irish Language Book of the Year award for Young People (Leabhar Na Bliana do Dhaoine Óga).

Cló Mhaigh Eo published Deirdre agus Mic Uisnigh ("Deirdre and the sons of Uisnech") as a prequel in 2008.
