= Louis le Brocquy =

Irish painter (1916–2012)

- Medb relieving herself (1968) by le Brocquy
- Born: 10 November 1916; Dublin, Ireland
- Died: 25 April 2012 (aged 95); Dublin, Ireland
- Education: Self-taught
- Known for: Painting, Drawing, Sculpture, Printmaking, Ceramics, Tapestry, Illustration, Design
- Notable work: A Family; The Tain illustrations
- Awards: Premio Acquisto Internationale, Venice Biennale, 1956; Saoi, 1993

Louis le Brocquy HRHA ([lwi lə bʁɔki]; 10 November 1916 – 25 April 2012) was an Irish painter born in Dublin to Albert and Sybil le Brocquy. Louis' sister is the sculptor Melanie Le Brocquy. His work received many accolades in a career that spanned some seventy years of creative practice. In 1956, he represented Ireland at the Venice Biennale, winning the Premio Acquisito Internationale (a once-off award when the event was acquired by the Nestle Corporation) with A Family (National Gallery of Ireland), subsequently included in the historic exhibition Fifty Years of Modern Art Brussels, World Fair 1958. The same year he married the Irish painter Anne Madden and left London to work in the French Midi.

== Education ==
Le Brocquy was educated at St Gerard's School, studied chemistry at Kevin Street Technical School in 1934, and then Trinity College Dublin.

== Work ==
Le Brocquy is widely acclaimed for his evocative "Portrait Heads" of literary figures and fellow artists. These include William Butler Yeats, James Joyce, and his friends Samuel Beckett, Francis Bacon and Seamus Heaney. Towards the end of his life, le Brocquy's early "Tinker" subjects and Grey period "Family" paintings attracted attention on the international marketplace, placing le Brocquy within a very select group of British and Irish artists whose works commanded prices in excess of £1 million during their lifetimes, a group that includes Lucian Freud, David Hockney, Frank Auerbach, and Francis Bacon.

The artist's work is represented in numerous public collections from the Guggenheim, New York to the Tate Modern, London. In Ireland, he is honoured as the first and only painter to be included during his lifetime in the Permanent Irish Collection of the National Gallery of Ireland. Le Brocquy died on 25 April 2012 and was survived by his daughter Seyre from his first marriage (1938–1948) to Jean Stoney, and his two grandsons John-Paul and David; his second wife Anne Madden whom he married in 1958, and their two sons, Pierre and Alexis.

Le Brocquy designed the covers for the albums Lark in the Morning and The Rising of the Moon.

Le Brocquy illustrated Thomas Kinsella's 1968 translation of Táin Bó Cúailnge. In this series of illustrations, Le Brocquy developed a distinctive style which alluded to cave painting, Rorschach tests and calligraphy. The Louis le Brocquy Táin illustrations are the works, and style of work, most closely associated with the artist in Ireland.

== Monographs ==
- Juncosa, Enriqué, Louis le Brocquy. The Head Image, IMMA Series (Dublin: Irish Museum of Modern Art, 2006), with a contribution by Louis le Brocquy 'The Human Head, Notes on painting and awareness', 48 pp., 16 plates. ISBN 88-8158-616-9
- Le Brocquy, Pierre, ed., Louis le Brocquy, The Head Image, (Kinsale: Gandon Editions 1996), with contributions by Prof. George Morgan 'An interview with Louis le Brocquy'; Michael Peppiatt 'An interview with Louis le Brocquy' (1979), [French – German trans.] 184 pp., 80 plates. ISBN 0-946641-58-7
- Madden le Brocquy, Anne, Louis le Brocquy, A Painter Seeing his Way (Dublin: Gill & Macmillan, 1994), 317 pp., 118 duotones. ISBN 0-7171-2180-1
- Morgan, George, Louis le Brocquy, The Irish Landscape (Dublin: Gandon Editions, 1992), with contributions by Louis le Brocquy 'Artist's Note'; Prof. George Morgan 'Watercolour Landscape Painting – An interview with Louis le Brocquy', [French – German trans.] 100 pp., 40 plates. including special edition. Limited to 250 numbered copies, signed and numbered by the artist. Bound in dark grey cloth, black Morocco spine, stamped in silver, housed in publisher's matching slip-case, Kenny's Bindery, Galway. ISBN 0-946641-29-3
- Morgan, George, Louis le Brocquy, Procession (Kinsale: Gandon Editions, 1994), contributions by Prof. George Morgan 'An interview with Louis le Brocquy', [French – German trans.] 65 pp., 28 plates. ISBN 0-946641-44-7
- Walker, Dorothy, Louis le Brocquy (Dublin: Ward River Press, 1981; London: Hodder & Stoughton, 1982), with contributions by John Russell; Dorothy Walker; Earnán O’Malley; le Brocquy 'A Painter's Notes on his Irishness', 'Notes on Painting and Awareness'; Jacques Dupin 'The Paintings of 1964 – 1966'; Claude Esteban 'Archaeology of the Face: Images of Lorca'; Seamus Heaney 'Louis le Brocquy's heads'. 167 pp., 140 plates. ISBN 0-907085-13-X

== Catalogues (selected) ==
- London: Gimpel Fils, Louis le Brocquy, Watercolours, 20 May – 14 June 1947. Text by Denys Sutton.
- Dublin: The Victor Waddington Galleries, Paintings and Tapestries by Louis le Brocquy, December 1951
- Los Angeles: Esther Robles Gallery, Louis le Brocquy, 23 May – 20 June 1960.
- Zürich: Galerie Leinhard, Louis le Brocquy, January 1961. Text by Robert Melville [French trans.].
- London: Gimpel Fils, Louis le Brocquy, 12 September – 10 October 1961. Text by Herbert Read.
- Dublin: Municipal Gallery of Modern Art [Arts Council/An Chomhairle Ealaíon], Louis le Brocquy, A Retrospective Selection of Oil Paintings 1939 – 1966, 8 November – 11 December 1966. Texts by Francis Bacon; Anne Crookshank 'Louis le Brocquy'; Jacques Dupin 'The Paintings of 1964 – 1966' [French trans.].
- Belfast: Ulster Museum, Louis le Brocquy, A Retrospective Selection of Oil Paintings 1939 – 1966, 19 December – 1 January 1967. ASIN: B0006CH5G4
- Zürich: Gimpel & Hanover Galerie, Louis le Brocquy, Bilder 1967 – 1968, 12 January – 12 February 1969. Texts by Anne Crookshank, Jacques Dupin, Herbert Read, Robert Melville [German].
- New York: Gimpel Weitzenhoffer, Louis le Brocquy, 27 April – 15 May 1971.
- St. Paul: Fondation Maeght, Louis le Brocquy, 9 March – 8 April 1973. Texts by Claude Esteban 'Histoire Calcinée'; Jacques Dupin 'Louis le Brocquy' [French].
- London: Gimpel Fils Gallery, Louis le Brocquy, 1–26 October 1974. Text by John Montague 'The Later le Brocquy' [including Italian trans.]. ASIN: B0007AJR34
- Dublin: Dawson Gallery, Louis le Brocquy, Studies Towards an Image of W.B. Yeats, 26 November – 13 December 1975. Text by le Brocquy 'Studies Towards an Image of W.B. Yeats'.
- Paris: Musée d’Art Moderne de la Ville, Louis le Brocquy, A la Recherche de W.B. Yeats. Cent Portraits Imaginaires, 15 October – 28 November 1976. Texts by Jacques Lassaigne; John Montague 'Les visages de Yeats'; le Brocquy 'A la recherche de Yeats'.
- Genoa: Galleria d’Arte San Marco dei Giustiniani, Genova, Louis le Brocquy, Studies Towards an Image of James Joyce, 12 November – 7 December 1977. Texts by le Brocquy 'Studies towards an Image of James Joyce'; John Montague 'Jawseyes' [including Italian trans.]. ASIN: B0007BIC1G
- New York: Gimpel Weitzenhoffer, Louis le Brocquy, Studies Towards an Image of James Joyce, September – October 1978.
- Montreal: Waddington Galleries, Louis le Brocquy, Studies Towards an Image of James Joyce, November 1978.
- Barcelona: Galeria Maeght, Louis le Brocquy, 88 Studies Towards an Image of Federico García Lorca, October 1978. Text by Claude Esteban 'Arqueologia del rostro' [Spanish – French].
- Paris: Galerie Jeanne-Bucher, Louis le Brocquy, Images de W. B. Yeats, James Joyce, Samuel Beckett, Federico García Lorca, Auguste Strindberg, Francis Bacon, 27 November – 27 December 1979. Text by Michael Peppiatt 'Louis le Brocquy' [French]. ISBN 2-85562-003-1
- Albany: New York State Museum, Louis le Brocquy and the Celtic Head Image, 26 September – 29 November 1981. Texts by Kevin M. Cahill; Proinsias MacCana 'The Cult of Heads'; Anne Crookshank 'Louis le Brocquy'. ASIN: B000PT8ZJE
- Zürich: Gimpel-Hanover Galerie, Louis le Brocquy, études vers une image de William Shakespeare, 14 January – 19 February 1983. ISBN 2-85562-012-0
- Charleroi, Belgium: Palais des Beaux-Arts, Louis le Brocquy, 23 October – 28 November 1982. Texts by Serge Faucherau 'La Peinture de Louis le Brocquy'; Proinsias MacCana 'Le culte des têtes'.
- Melbourne: Westpac Gallery [Per National Gallery of Victoria], Louis le Brocquy, Images, 1975–1987, May – June 1988.
- Antibes: Musée Picasso, Louis le Brocquy, Images, 1975–1988, 1 July – 15 September 1989. Texts by Danièle Giraudy, Michael Gibson, John Montague, Bernard Noël, Robert Melville, Seamus Heaney, Richard Kearney [French].
- Kamakura, Japan: Museum of Modern Art, Kanagawa, Louis le Brocquy, Images Single and Multiple, 1957–1990, 5 January – 3 February 1991. Texts by Brendan Kennelly 'A Peering Boy'; Dorothy Walker 'Images, Single and Multiple 1957 – 1990'; Seamus Heaney 'Holding the Eye'; John Russell 'Louis le Brocquy'; Tadayasu Sakai 'Notes for a Discussion of Louis le Brocquy' [English/Japanese].
- Dublin: Irish Museum of Modern Art, Louis le Brocquy, Paintings 1939 – 1996, 16 October 1996 – 16 February 1997. Texts by Declan McGonagal; Alistair Smith 'Louis le Brocquy: On the Spiritual in Art'. ISBN 1-873654-46-4
- London: Agnew's, Louis le Brocquy, Aubusson Tapestries, 3–29 May 2001. Preface by Mark Adams. Texts by le Brocquy 'Artist's Notes'; Seamus Heaney 'le Brocquy's Táin'; Dorothy Walker 'Le Brocquy's Tapestries'.
- Cork: Crawford Municipal Art Gallery, Louis le Brocquy, Procession, 10 October – 15 November 2003. Text by Peter Murray 'Eros and Thanatos, Louis le Brocquy's Procession paintings'.
- Limerick: The Hunt Museum, Louis le Brocquy Allegory and Legend, June – September 2006. Text by Yvonne Scott 'Allegory and Legend'. ISBN 0-9520922-5-5
- Paris: Galerie Jeanne-Bucher, Louis le Brocquy, Radiance, 'Retrospective à l’occasion de son 90ème anniversaire', 12 October – 10 November 2006. Texts by Jean-François Jaeger and Louis le Brocquy, 'Notes on my painting'.
- London: Gimpel Fils, Louis le Brocquy. Homage to his Masters, 24 November – 13 January 2007. Text by James Hamilton, 'Ireland's Prospero of Painting: Celebrating the Sixty Year Partnership between Louis le Brocquy and Gimpel Fils'. OCLC 201657178 ISBN 978-1-899421-09-1
- Dublin: National Gallery of Ireland, Louis le Brocquy, Portrait Heads: 'A celebration of the artist's 90th birthday', 4 November – 13 January 2007. Texts by Colm Tóibín 'Louis le Brocquy, A Portrait of the Artist as an Alchemist'; Dr. Síghle Bhreathnach-Lynch ‘"Behind the Billowing Curtain of the Face". Louis le Brocquy's Portrait Heads'; Pierre le Brocquy 'Chronology: The Head Series'. ASIN: B001X644OI
- Dublin, Dublin City Gallery The Hugh Lane. Louis le Brocquy and his Masters. Early Heroes, Later Homage, 14 January – 30 March 2007. Texts by Barbara Dawson 'Unfailing Eye', Louis le Brocquy 'Artist's Note', Mick Wilson 'To look, and then to look again, once more', Pierre le Brocquy 'Chronology: First Works'. ISBN 1-901702-24-3

== See also ==
- List of people on the postage stamps of Ireland
- le Brocquy, Louis. "The Human Head: Notes on Painting and Awareness"—a Distinguished International Lecture delivered at RCSI on 14 November 2005 (at age 88). Included in The Open Door: Art and Foreign Policy at the RCSI (pp. 70–85). A joint publication of The Royal College of Surgeons in Ireland and The Center for International Humanitarian Cooperation, Dublin 2014. Excerpt: "...I think that painting is not a means of communication or self-expression... I sometimes think of the activity of painting as a kind of archaeology—an archaeology of the spirit..."
