= Anne Madden (artist) =

English-born Irish painter (1932–2025)

- Born: 1932; London, England
- Died: 21 December 2025 (aged 93); Dublin, Ireland
- Education: Chelsea School of Arts & Crafts
- Known for: Abstract painting
- Spouse: Louis le Brocquy (m. 1958; died 2012)
- Website: anne-madden.com

Anne M. Madden (1932 – 21 December 2025) was an English-born Irish artist, primarily a painter, who was well known in both Ireland and France, between which she divided her time after her marriage to artist Louis le Brocquy in 1958. Having been invited to group shows from the age of 18, including the Irish Exhibition of Living Art from 1954, she had her first solo show in 1960, and represented Ireland at the Paris Biennale. In the 1980s, she concentrated on drawing for some years. Having lived in the south of France for over 40 years, she and her husband, fellow artist Louis le Brocquy moved to Dublin in 2000. Madden, whose works are widely held, died in December 2025.

== Early life ==
Anne M. Madden was born in London in 1932 to an Irish father and an Anglo-Chilean mother. She spent her first years in Chile, where her father owned a farm. Madden's family moved to Corofin, County Clare, Ireland, when she was aged 10. She subsequently moved to London and attended the Chelsea School of Arts and Crafts.

Her father died in a car crash when she was a teenager; her brother died at a young age of injuries sustained by falling down the stairs. She also lost her sister and brother-in-law in a plane crash, which left Madden as guardian to three young children. Her work was then interrupted for three years in the 1950s by a series of operations on her spine following a riding accident. During that time she met the painter Louis le Brocquy, who was then working in London. They married in Chartres Cathedral in 1958 and set up a house and studio in Carros in the south of France, where they remained until 2000.

== Career ==
=== 1950s ===
Madden began exhibiting in group shows in London when she was eighteen. One of her earliest exhibitions was with the New English Art Club. The Burren and her love of lonely places informed these early paintings.

In 1956 Madden visited the groundbreaking Modern Art in the United States exhibition at the Tate Gallery which began the assimilation of post-war American art, and in particular the influence of abstract expressionism, into her own works. In the late 1950s Madden was impressed by the works of Sam Francis and Jean-Paul Riopelle after viewing their works at the Royal Academy. She later met these artists in Paris along with Joan Mitchell and others with whom she exchanged works. The techniques employed included palette knife and paint flows and soon involved the use of multiple canvases as a means of creating pictorial interactions.

From 1954 Madden regularly contributed works to the Irish Exhibition of Living Art. At the 21st anniversary show, in 1964, she was awarded the painting prize of £150 for Promontory.

=== 1960s ===
In 1960 Madden had a solo exhibition in the Dawson Gallery, Dublin, which was a resounding success. The Irish Times reviewer commented,

"Anne Madden paints landscape with a quite remarkable power to dredge away the soft clothing which covers the land. She reveals the bones, the skeleton, not in the sense that such forms conote decay but rather to recall the simple grandeur which remains in winter snows or when wind has ripped away the foliage."

In the mid 1960s on, their comparatively reclusive life in Carros village was changed by the opening of the Fondation Maeght in Saint-Paul, where over the years they were constantly meeting painters, sculptors, writers, poets, and musicians forming friendships resumed in Paris and elsewhere. Madden was the first recipient of the Carroll Prize in 1964. Madden also had a solo exhibition at the New Gallery in Belfast in the autumn of 1964.

In 1965, Anne Madden represented Ireland at the Paris Biennale, before regularly exhibiting in that city. From the 1960s she began to paint a series of abstract landscapes influenced by her time as a young girl in the west of Ireland, near the Burren in County Clare. In 1966 Madden was one of four invited artists to show at the 9th annual exhibition of the Ulster Society of Women Artists in Belfast.

=== 1970s ===
Between 1970 and 1979 Madden painted a large series of vertical works, their size determined by her height and reach. The works derived from megaliths and other prehistoric monuments were reflections on life and death. These works tended to be hard-edged and dark in tone. Madden stated that they were an overt reflection of The Troubles in Northern Ireland,

"They tended to be dark tonally, reflections of grief, of the Irish landscape, of an instinctive search to find or extract light from darkness; elegies of personal grief but also to the terrible and tragic events in Northern Ireland."

Madden showed work at the Oireachtas Exhibition in 1971 and had three solo exhibitions in 1974 - at the Ulster Museum, Belfast, the New Art Centre, London, and at the Dawson Gallery in Dublin. Madden enjoyed a further one-person show, at the Arts Council of Northern Ireland Gallery in 1979.

=== 1980s onwards ===
In the 1980s, Madden stopped painting for a time and devoted herself to drawing. This resulted in a series of large works in graphite and oil paint on paper entitled Openings. These works formed the core of an exhibition at the Fondation Maeght in 1983. Three of those works were then displayed as part of ROSC '84 when Madden was one of nine Irish artists invited to show. A self-portrait of Madden was amongst 15 new exhibits inaugurated to the National Self Portrait Collection of Ireland in a show at the Kneafsey Gallery, Limerick, in spring 1987. Madden held a one-woman show of new works at the Taylor Gallery in Dublin in 1987.

In 1990, Madden held a solo show at the Kerlin Gallery in Dublin, where she was to return with Drawings of Masters in 1992. Madden returned to painting on canvas. She continued to develop and produce a large body of work which was presented in an Arts Council of Ireland retrospective in 1991, at the Royal Hibernian Academy in Dublin.

In 1994, she received a commission from Ronald Tallon, architect of the O'Reilly Hall at University College Dublin, to paint one of ten large paintings displayed within the Aula Maxima. In 1999, the French village of Carros, where she lived, commissioned Madden to paint a large vaulted ceiling painting measuring 54m² for its medieval castle which opened as an international contemporary art centre. The artist produced Empyrius in her nearby studio before it was mounted in situ as a permanent installation. The venue also has a permanent room dedicated to Madden's work.

In 2000, Madden and her husband returned to live and work in Dublin, taking over a property which was once Sarah Purser's studio. Madden, who was a naturalist, had grown vines and olives in France, which led her to present a collection entitled The Garden of Love at the Taylor Galleries in 2002. Madden showed once more with the Hugh Lane Gallery in 2017 in Colours of the Wind, a series of new works referencing Ariadne's golden thread, which the mythic figure gave to Theseus when he went into the Minotaur's labyrinth.

== Recognition ==
Madden was a member of the artistic academy Aosdána from 1986 until her death. In 2004, she was conferred with an honorary degree by University College Dublin and was made an Officier de l'Ordre des Arts et des Lettres by the French Government the same year.

== Personal life ==
Madden and Louis Le Brocquy had two sons, born in 1961 and 1963. In 1994, she published a biography about her husband entitled Louis le Brocquy: Seeing His Way. Her husband died on 25 April 2012.

Madden died on 21 December 2025 aged 93.

== Legacy ==
Madden's work can be found in many public and private collections across the globe, including the Ulster Museum, the Arts Council of Ireland collection, the Arts Council of Northern Ireland, Arts Council of England, Centre National d'art Contemporain Georges Pompidou, Museu Picasso, Musée d'Art Moderne de la Ville de Paris, Musée du Louvre, Hugh Lane Municipal Gallery, Trinity College, Dublin, and the National Self-Portrait Collection of Ireland.
