= A Family (painting) =

1951 painting by Louis le Brocquy

- Artist: Louis le Brocquy
- Year: 1950–1951
- Medium: Oil on canvas
- Dimensions: 147 cm × 185 cm (57.8 in × 72.8 in)
- Location: National Gallery of Ireland; Dublin

A Family is a 1951 oil on canvas painting by Irish artist Louis le Brocquy. It depicts a woman half-lying on a table and gazing out at the viewer accompanied by a cat in the foreground, a man sitting hunched over in the background, and a child holding a bouquet of flowers on one side, gazing at the woman. The painting's stark grey colour palette and its portrayal of dejection within the family unit attracted strong criticism from some contemporaries in post-war Ireland, while others praised the artist's willingness to address the problems of the time in the work. It is currently on display in The National Gallery of Ireland.

Depicting a stark human condition in the aftermath of World War II, Síghle Bhreathnach-Lynch, Curator of Irish Art at the National Gallery of Ireland notes: 'The mother, lying on a table, leaning on one arm, stares out with quiet dignity while a menacing looking cat peers out from beneath the draw sheet. In the background the father sits, head bowed, in a pose suggesting total dejection. He appears to be oblivious to the small child holding a bunch of flowers; a symbol of hope. The three sombrely-painted figures inhabit a grey concrete bunker, lit by a bare bulb. The theme of this disturbingly bleak work is the nature of individual isolation and the breakdown of societal norms.'

== Background and influences ==
A Family belongs to the artist's Grey Period (1951–55). Widely acknowledged as the artist's masterpiece from this period, the painting marks a shift in palette from the comparatively colourful work of the late forties to predominant whites and greys. The art critic John Berger writes in Art News and Review: 'His style has developed and changed; his colours are pale and severe - the Family is mostly grey; his forms, in their movement both across and into the picture, are precise. This finesse implies - because le Brocquy's motive is always human - a tenderness which is not sentimental, and a sense of wonder which is exact; one thinks twice about the quite ordinary but in fact miraculous construction of any man's back, having looked at the father in the Family.'

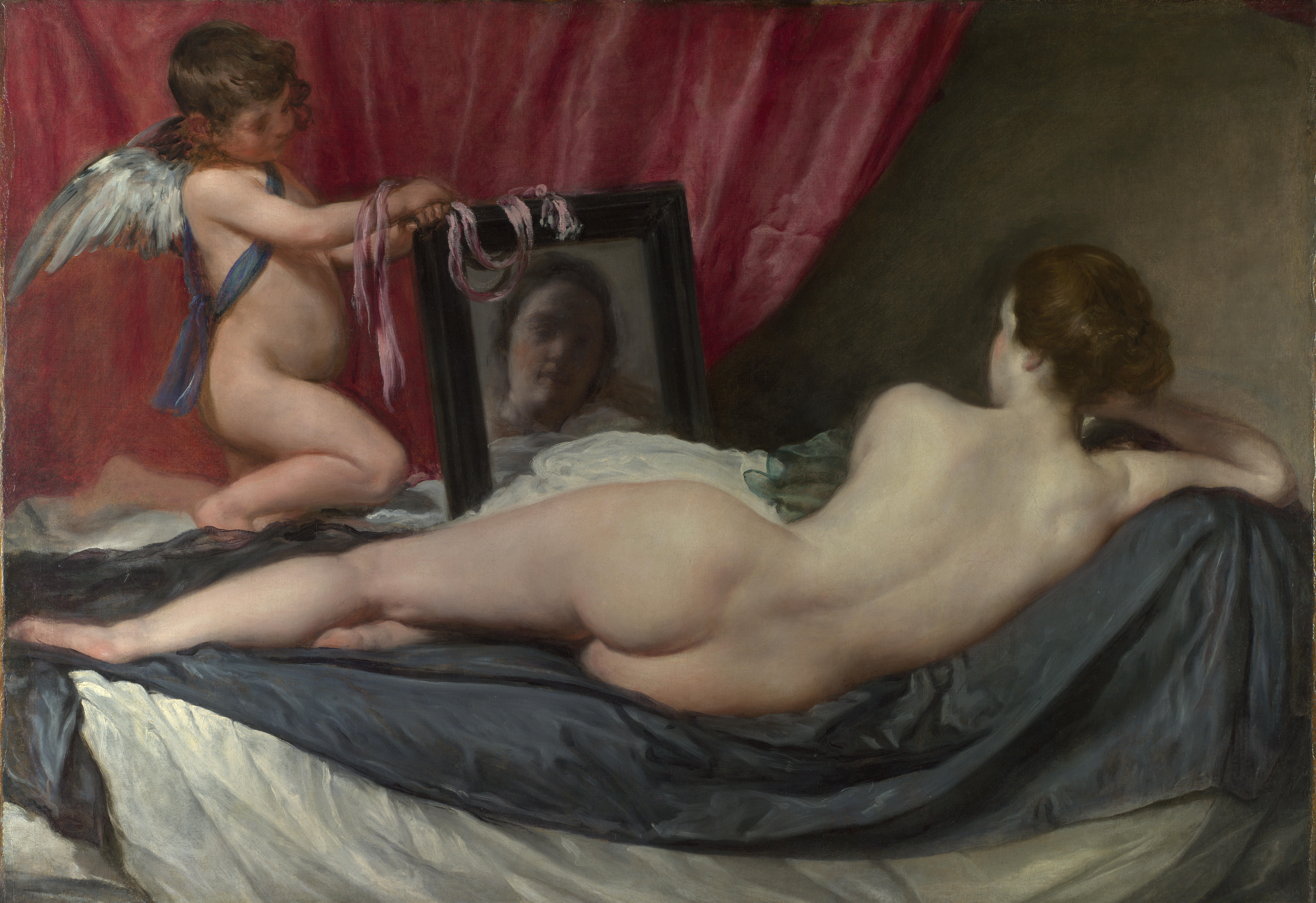
La Venus del espejo, Diego Velázquez, c.1647–1651, Oil on canvas, 122 × 177 cm, National Gallery, London

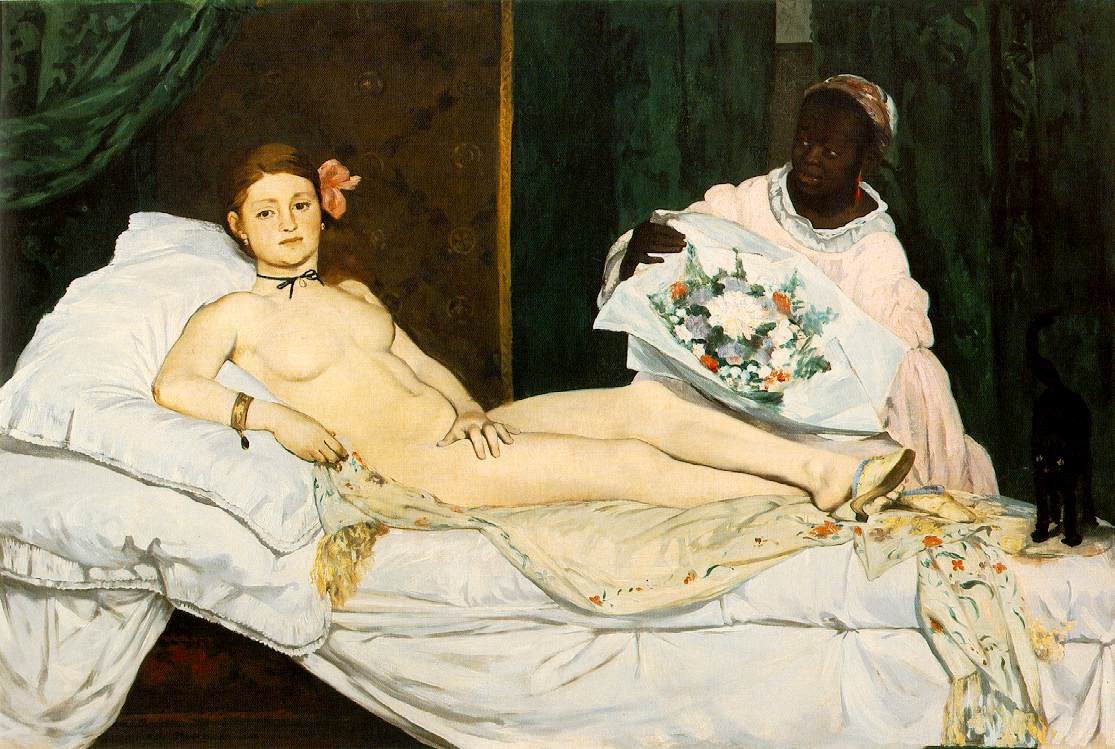
Édouard Manet, Olympia, oil on canvas, 1863, Musée d'Orsay, Paris

According to the art critic John Russell: 'In the early 1950s, above all, he came before us as a man who was looking for the image that would compound all other images. Anyone who was around at the time and concerned with what was called "post-war British art" will remember the painting called "A Family".' Louis le Brocquy explains: 'I have always been fascinated by the horizontal monumentality of traditional Odalisque painting, the reclining woman depicted voluptuously by one Master after another throughout the history of European art - Titians' Venus of Urbino, Velázquez' Rokeby Venus turning her back on the Spanish Court, Goya's Maja clothed and unclothed, Ingres' Reclining Odalisque in her seraglio and finally the great Olympia of Édouard Manet celebrating his favourite model, Victorine Meurent. My own painting A Family was conceived in 1950 in very different circumstances in face of the atomic threat, social upheaval and refugees of World War II and its aftermath. The elements in its composition correspond in some ways to those of Olympia, if not to Manet's cool sensuality. The female figure in A Family may be seen to take on a very different significance. The man, replacing Manet's black servant with bouquet, sits alone. The bouquet is reduced to a mere wisp held by a child. The Olympian black cat in turn becomes white, ominously emerging from the sheets. This is how A Family appears to me today. Fifty years ago it was painted while contemplating a human condition stripped back to Palaeolithic circumstance under electric light bulbs.'

== History ==
The painting was first exhibited in London at Gimpel Fils in June 1951, where it received considerable praise. In 1952, a group of art patrons offered to present the painting to the Hugh Lane Gallery, but the gift was rejected by the Art Advisory Committee on the grounds of "incompetence." The rejection prompted public disputes among artists and art critics which reflected divided opinions on the merits of modern art. Over time, attitudes towards the painting grew more positive. In June 1956 Louis le Brocquy represented Ireland at the Venice Biennale and A Family was awarded the Nestlé-endowed Premio Aquisitato. At the 1958 World Fair in Brussels, it was recognized for its historical impact in the exhibition Cinquante Ans d'Art Moderne ("Fifty Years of Modern Art").

In 2002, A Family entered the permanent collection of the National Gallery of Ireland as a gift of Lochlann and Brenda Quinn. It was the first painting to ever enter the Gallery's permanent collection while its artist was still living. The curator of the gallery, Síghle Bhreathnach-Lynch, commented that "A Family is rightly recognized as a seminal painting in the history of 20th-century Irish art. It is not only an important transitional work in the artist's oeuvre but one anticipating modernism as an everyday style in Irish art."

== Critical reception ==
During its 1951 first exhibition at Gimpel Fils, the painting attracted considerable praise. John Berger observed in Art News and Review: 'Le Brocquy is completely free of contemporary tendency to cosmic megalomania. It has become pretentious to talk of an artist's humility, yet that is what distinguishes his work; his studies testify to his patience, and his final, large picture to his refusal to evade simple but difficult problems by relying on the grandiose cliché ... The right-hand half of the very large Family group is, by itself, the finest bit of contemporary painting I have seen for a long time, and I am now convinced that le Brocquy is one of the really promising (in this case that infuriating word is not an excuse but an achievement) British [sic] painters of his generation.'Eric Newton singled out le Brocquy as "a lyrical artist with an exceptional evocative gift".

Following its rejection from the Hugh Lane Gallery, the painting fuelled widespread public hostility towards modern art in the press, while a small group of artists led ineffectual protests in support of contemporary art. Critics viewed the painting as an 'unwholesome and satanic distortion of natural beauty'; the aversion was summed up in an opinion published by the Dublin Evening Mail: 'There is a place for monstrosities in the College of Surgeons - there are plenty there - and it would give me much pleasure to find a place for things like "The Family" [sic] ... It is not given to man to see into the future, but I am quite certain that in another 100 years the works of Turner, Constable, and a galaxy of true artists, whose work is still with us, will be cherished and admired, while things like The Family [sic] will have returned to the oblivion from which they never should have emerged. As notes Dr. Síghle Bhreathnach-Lynch, ‘The artist's image of stark reality in the shape of the terrifying uncertainty of the post-war era and the resultant isolation of the family unit shocked rather than comforted. One letter writer to The Irish Times stated unequivocally that the picture in question is as remote from beauty as the utmost stretch of mortal imagination can conceive. The figures are bestial, horribly misshapen with heads and faces of idiots. If ordinary people met such figures in the streets they would flee from them in terror. The critic Tony Gray saw no tenderness in the forms portrayed. Rather he felt that they were "depressing and frightening" and the sombre palette merely "enhanced the despair of his theme." The Evening Herald headlined its review "What is it all about" and castigated the le Brocquy exhibition for representing what it called "the left in art" (an oblique reference to modernism). The artist was accused of having gone the way of everything sensational, shallow and ephemeral. The 'Man About Town' column in the Evening Mail believed that the whole composition was "bewildering and repulsive" (the length of the woman's neck seemed to be especially abhorrent!). A rhetorical question implying a negative reply was posed, "What is the aesthetic value of these distortions"? An editorial in the same newspaper broadened the enquiry to a consideration of the genuine value of modern art in general.

John Ryan, however, wrote in the Dublin Evening Mail: 'Louis le Brocquy discovered his peculiarly individual mode of expression early in his career and courageously employed it even when doing so meant that he had to discard a style which promised a fashionable and lucrative future as a portrait painter in the traditional manner. That pedestrian opinion has not forgiven him for this revolt against its standards was amply proved by the deplorable attack on the painter in the Evening Herald recently. Le Brocquy's stand and his subsequent development as an artist, however, won him the admiration and respect of intelligent opinion wherever his work has been shown. In Great Britain he is accepted as one of the handful of really brilliant painters of this generation, while America in so far as she has had the opportunity to judge has reacted similarly. Despite the strictures of the Evening Herald it is satisfactory to note that the exhibition itself has been an outstanding success in every respect.'

Art is neither an instrument nor a convenience, but a secret logic of the imagination. It is another way of seeing, the whole sense and value of which lies in its autonomy, its distance from actuality, its otherness.

— Louis le Brocquy
