= Peppercanister Press =

Press in Dublin

Peppercanister Press was a small press in Dublin founded by Thomas Kinsella to publish his own poetry. In later years, the series began to be published by Dedalus Press.

== Publications ==
=== First series ===
- Peppercanister 1, Butcher's Dozen: A Lesson for the Octave of Widgery (1972)

printed shortly after the Widgery Tribunal

- Peppercanister 2, A Selected Life (1972)

in memoriam Seán Ó Riada

- Peppercanister 3, Vertical Man (1973)

a sequel to Peppercanister 2

- Peppercanister 4, The Good Fight (1973)

noting the anniversary of John F. Kennedy assassination

The first series was collected into the book Fifteen Dead (Dolmen/Oxford, 1979)

=== Second series ===
- Peppercanister 5, One (1974)

continuing themes from his book Notes from the Land of the Dead; includes illustrations by Anne Yeats

- Peppercanister 6, A Technical Supplement (1976)

includes details of illustrations from Diderot's Encyclopédie

- Peppercanister 7, Song of the Night and Other Poems (1976)

The second series was collected into the book One and Other Poems (Dolmen/Oxford, 1979)
The first and second series were collected into the book Peppercanister Poems 1972-1978 (Wake Forest University Press, 1979)

=== Third series ===
- Peppercanister 8, The Messenger (1985)
- Peppercanister 9, Songs of the Psyche (1985)
- Peppercanister 10, Her Vertical Smile (1985)

These three were published simultaneously.

- Peppercanister 11, Out of Ireland
- Peppercanister 12, St. Catherine's Clock

These two were later collected as Blood and Family (Oxford University Press, 1988)

=== Later publications ===
- Peppercanister 13, One Fond Embrace (1988)
- Peppercanister 14, Personal Places (1990)
- Peppercanister 15, Poems from Centre City (1990)
- Peppercanister 16, "Madonna" and Other Poems (1995)
- Peppercanister 17, "Open Court" (1991)
- Peppercanister 18, The Dual Tradition: An Essay on Poetry and Politics in Ireland (1995)
- Peppercanister 19, The Pen Shop (1997)
- Peppercanister 20, The Familiar (1999)
- Peppercanister 21, Godhead (1999)
- Peppercanister 22, Citizen of the World
- Peppercanister 23, Littlebody
- Peppercanister 24, Marginal Economy
- Peppercanister 25, Readings in Poetry

Kinsella discusses works by William Shakespeare, W. B. Yeats and T. S. Eliot

- Peppercanister 26, Man of War
- Peppercanister 27, Belief and Unbelief (2007)
- Peppercanister 28, Fat Master (2011)
- Peppercanister 29, Love Joy Peace (2011)

24, 26-29 collected as Late Poems (Carcanet Press, 2013)

== Other collections ==
- Thomas Kinsella: The Peppercanister Poems (University College Dublin Press, 2001)
