= Táin Bó Cúailnge =

Epic of early Irish literature

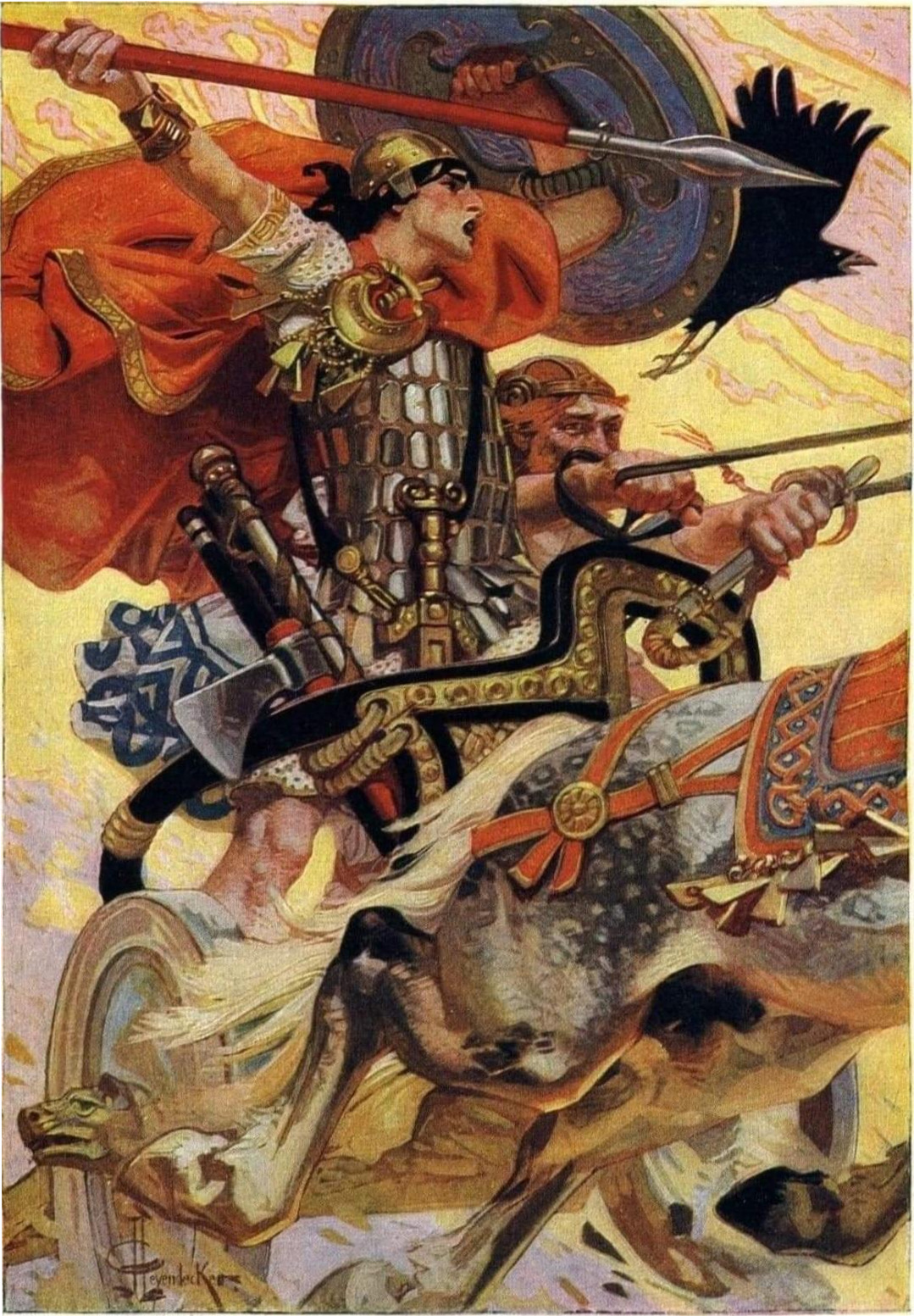
Cú Chulainn in battle, from T. W. Rolleston, Myths & Legends of the Celtic Race, 1911; illustration by J. C. Leyendecker

Táin Bó Cúailnge (Modern Irish pronunciation: [ˈt̪ˠaːnʲ bˠoː ˈkuəlʲɲə]; "the driving-off of the cows of Cooley"), commonly known as The Táin or less commonly as The Cattle Raid of Cooley, is an epic from Irish mythology. It is often called "the Irish Iliad", although like most other early Irish literature, the Táin is written in prosimetrum, i.e. prose with periodic additions of verse composed by the characters. The Táin tells of a war against Ulster by Queen Medb of Connacht and her husband King Ailill, who intend to steal the stud bull Donn Cuailnge. Due to a curse upon the king and warriors of Ulster, the invaders are opposed only by the young demigod, Cú Chulainn.

The Táin is traditionally set in the 1st century in a pagan heroic age, and is the central text of a group of tales known as the Ulster Cycle. It survives in three written versions or "recensions" in manuscripts of the 12th century and later, the first a compilation largely written in Old Irish, the second a more consistent work in Middle Irish, and the third an Early Modern Irish version.

The Táin has been influential in Irish literature and culture. It is often considered Ireland's national epic.

== Synopsis ==
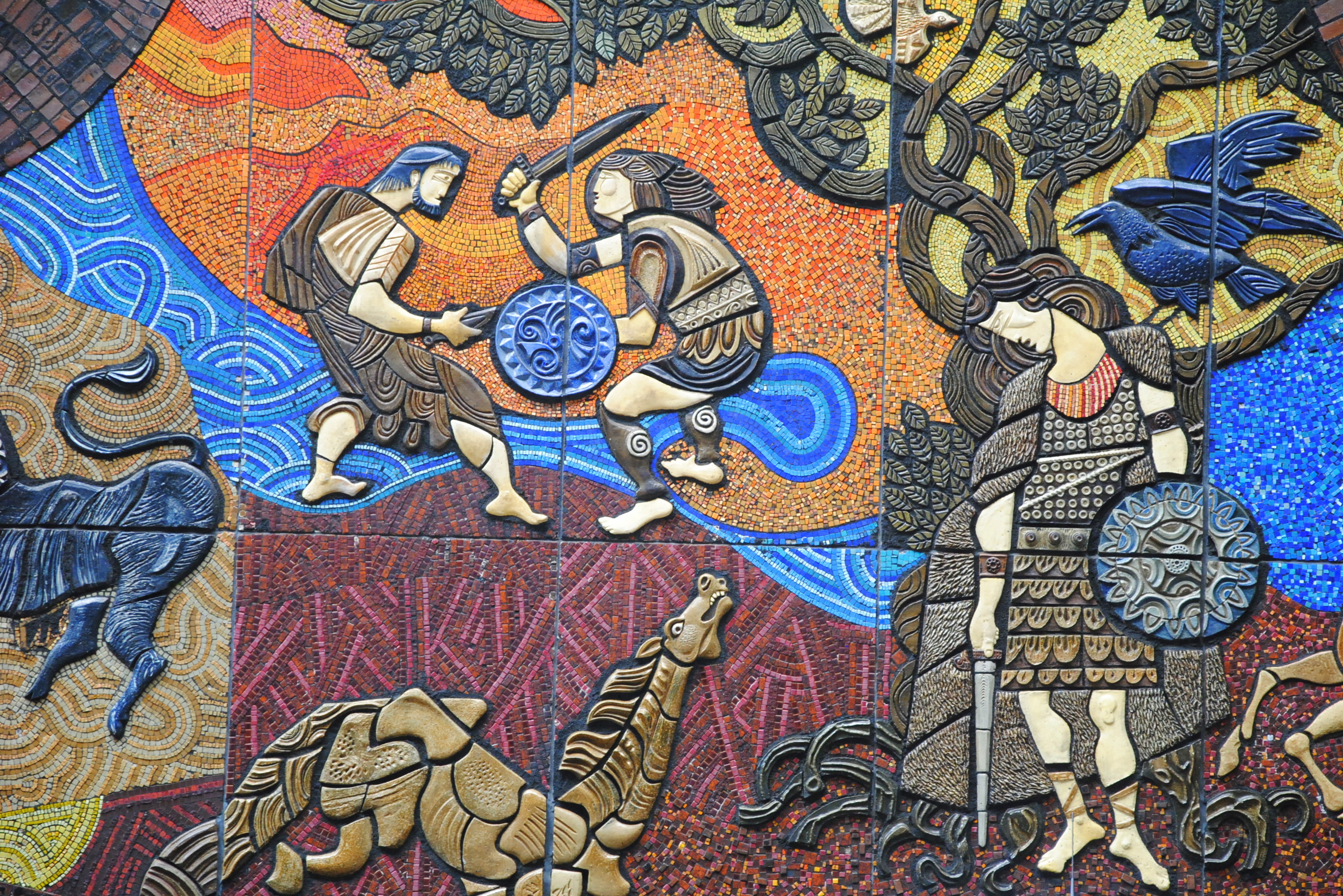
Events from the Táin in a mosaic mural in Dublin by Desmond Kinney

The Táin is preceded by a number of remscéla, or pre-tales, which provide background on the main characters and explain the presence of certain characters from Ulster in the Connacht camp, the curse that causes the temporary inability of the remaining Ulstermen to fight and the magic origins of the bulls Donn Cuailnge and Finnbhennach. The eight remscéla chosen by Thomas Kinsella for his 1969 translation are sometimes taken to be part of the Táin itself, but come from a variety of manuscripts of different dates. Several other tales exist which are described as remscéla to the Táin, some of which have only a tangential relation to it.

The first recension begins with Ailill and Medb assembling their army in Cruachan; the purpose of this military build-up is taken for granted. The second recension adds a prologue in which Ailill and Medb compare their respective wealths and find that the only thing that distinguishes them is Ailill's possession of the phenomenally fertile bull Finnbhennach, who had been born into Medb's herd but scorned being owned by a woman so decided to transfer himself to Ailill's. Medb determines to get the equally potent Donn Cuailnge from Cooley to equal her wealth with her husband. She successfully negotiates with the bull's owner, Dáire mac Fiachna, to rent the animal for a year. However, her messengers, while drunk, reveal that Medb intends to take the bull by force if she is not allowed to borrow him. The deal breaks down, and Medb raises an army, including 3000 Ulster exiles led by Fergus mac Róich and other allies, and sets out to capture Donn Cuailnge.

The men of Ulster are disabled by an apparent illness, the ces noínden (literally "debility of nine (days)", although it lasts several months). A separate tale explains this as the curse of the goddess Macha, who imposed it after being forced by the king of Ulster to race against a chariot while heavily pregnant. The only person fit to defend Ulster is seventeen-year-old Cú Chulainn, and he lets the army take Ulster by surprise because he is off on a tryst when he should be watching the border. Cú Chulainn, assisted by his charioteer Láeg, wages a guerrilla campaign against the advancing army, then halts it by invoking the right of single combat at fords, defeating champion after champion in a stand-off lasting months. However, he is unable to prevent Medb from capturing the bull.

Cú Chulainn is both helped and hindered by supernatural figures from the Tuatha Dé Danann. Before one combat the Morrígan, the goddess of war, visits him in the form of a beautiful young woman and offers him her love, but Cú Chulainn spurns her. She then reveals herself and threatens to interfere in his next fight. She does so, first in the form of an eel who trips him in the ford, then as a wolf who stampedes cattle across the ford, and finally as a heifer at the head of the stampede, but in each form, Cú Chulainn wounds her. After he defeats his opponent, the Morrígan appears to him in the form of an old woman milking a cow, with wounds corresponding to the ones Cú Chulainn gave her in her animal forms. She offers him three drinks of milk. With each drink he blesses her, and the blessings heal her wounds. Cú Chulainn tells the Morrígan that had he known her real identity, he would not have spurned her.

After a particularly arduous combat Cú Chulain is visited by another supernatural figure, Lug, who reveals himself to be Cú Chulainn's father. Lug puts Cú Chulainn to sleep for three days while he works his healing arts on him. While Cú Chulainn sleeps the youth corps of Ulster come to his aid but are all slaughtered. When Cú Chulainn awakes he undergoes a spectacular ríastrad or "distortion", in which his body twists in its skin and he becomes an unrecognisable monster who knows neither friend nor foe. Cú Chulainn launches a savage assault on the Connacht camp and avenges the youth corps sixfold.

After this extraordinary incident, the sequence of single combats resumes, although on several occasions Medb breaks the agreement by sending several men against Cú Chulainn at once. When Fergus, his foster-father, is sent to fight him, Cú Chulainn agrees to yield to him on the condition that Fergus yields the next time they meet. Finally, Medb incites Cú Chulainn's foster-brother Ferdiad to enter the fray, with poets ready to mock him as a coward, and offering him the hand of her daughter Finnabair, and her own "friendly thighs" as well. Cú Chulainn does not wish to kill his foster-brother and pleads with Ferdiad to withdraw from the fight. There follows a physically and emotionally gruelling three-day duel between the hero and his foster-brother. Cú Chulainn wins, killing Ferdiad with the legendary spear, the Gáe Bolga. Wounded too sorely to continue fighting, Cú Chulainn is carried away by the healers of his clan.

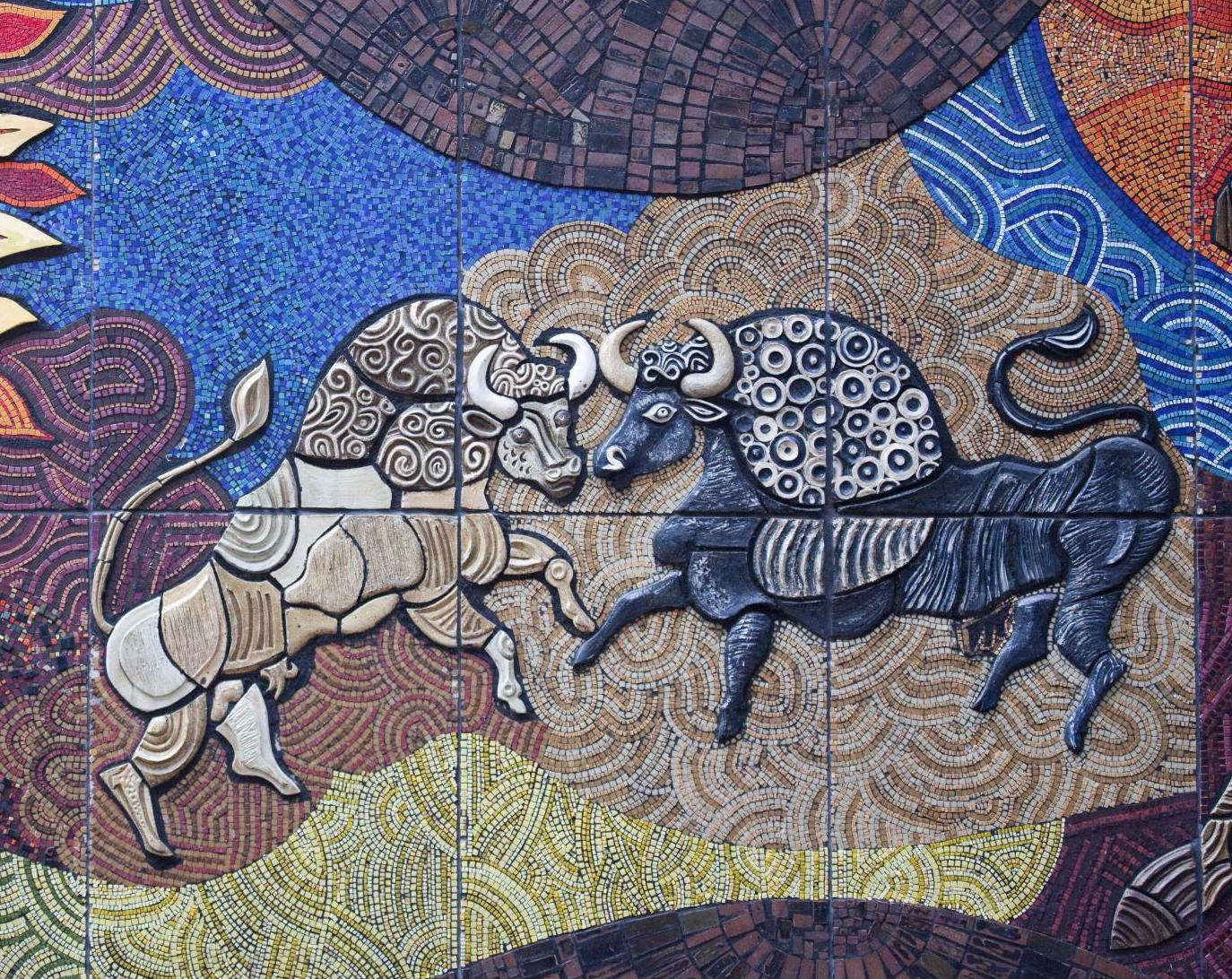
Finnbhennach (left) and Donn Cuailnge (right)

The debilitated Ulstermen start to rouse, one by one at first, then en masse. King Conchobar mac Nessa vows, that as the sky is above and the Earth is beneath, he will return every cow back to its stall and every abducted woman back to her home. The climactic battle begins.

At first, Cú Chulainn sits it out, recovering from his wounds. Fergus has Conchobar at his mercy, but is prevented from killing him by Cormac Cond Longas, Conchobar's son and Fergus' foster-son, and in his rage cuts the tops off three hills with his sword. Cú Chulainn shrugs off his wounds, enters the fray and confronts Fergus, whom he forces to make good on his promise and yield before him. Fergus withdraws, pulling all his forces off the battlefield. Connacht's other allies panic and Medb is forced to retreat. Cú Chulainn comes upon Medb having her period (Is and drecgais a fúal fola for Meidb "Then it was that the issue of blood came upon Medb"). She pleads for her life and he not only spares her, but guards her retreat.

Medb brings Donn Cuailnge back to Connacht, where the bull fights Finnbhennach, kills him, but is mortally wounded, and wanders around Ireland dropping pieces of Finnbhennach off his horns and thus creating placenames before finally returning home to die of exhaustion.

== Text ==
=== Oral tradition ===
The Táin is believed to have its origin in oral storytelling and to have only been written down during the Middle Ages.

Although Romanas Bulatovas believes that the Táin was originally composed at Bangor Abbey between 630 and 670 AD, there is evidence that it had a far older oral history long before anything was written down. For example, the poem Conailla Medb michuru ("Medb enjoined illegal contracts") by Luccreth moccu Chiara, dated to c. 600, tells the story of Fergus mac Róich's exile with Ailill and Medb, which the poet describes as having come from sen-eolas ("old knowledge"). Two further 7th-century poems also allude to elements of the story: in Verba Scáthaige ("Words of Scáthach"), the warrior-woman Scáthach prophesies Cú Chulainn's combats at the ford; and Ro-mbáe laithi rordu rind ("We had a great day of plying spear-points"), attributed to Cú Chulainn himself, refers to an incident in the Boyhood Deeds section of the Táin.

The high regard in which the written account was held is suggested by a ninth-century triad, that associated the Táin with the following wonders: "that the cuilmen [apparently a name for Isidore of Seville's Etymologiae] came to Ireland in its stead; the dead relating it to the living, viz. Fergus mac Róich reciting it to Ninníne the poet at the time of Cormac mac Faeláin; one year's protection to him to whom it is related."

Various versions of the epic have been collected from the oral tradition over the centuries since the earliest accounts were written down. A version of the Táin was taken down in Scottish Gaelic by folklore collector Calum Maclean from the dictation of Angus Beag MacLellan, a tenant farmer and seanchaidh from South Uist, in the Outer Hebrides. A transcription was published in 1959.

=== Manuscripts ===
Despite the date of the surviving manuscripts, a version of the Táin may have been put to writing already in the eighth century.

Táin Bó Cúailnge has survived in three recensions. The first consists of a partial text in Lebor na hUidre (the "Book of the Dun Cow"), a late 11th-/early 12th-century manuscript compiled in the monastery at Clonmacnoise, and another partial text of the same version in the 14th-century manuscript called the Yellow Book of Lecan. These two sources overlap, and a complete text can be reconstructed by combining them. This recension is a compilation of two or more earlier versions, indicated by the number of duplicated episodes and references to "other versions" in the text. Many of the episodes are superb, written in the characteristic terse prose of the best Old Irish literature, but others are cryptic summaries, and the whole is rather disjointed. Parts of this recension can be dated from linguistic evidence to the 8th century, and some of the verse passages may be even older.

The second recension is found in the 12th-century manuscript known as the Book of Leinster. This appears to have been a syncretic exercise by a scribe who brought together the Lebor na hUidre materials and unknown sources for the Yellow Book of Lecan materials to create a coherent version of the epic. While the result is a satisfactory narrative whole, the language has been modernised into a much more florid style, with all of the spareness of expression of the earlier recension lost in the process.

The Book of Leinster version ends with a colophon in Latin which says:

But I who have written this story, or rather this fable, give no credence to the various incidents related in it. For some things in it are the deceptions of demons, other poetic figments; some are probable, others improbable; while still others are intended for the delectation of foolish men.

— (O'Rahilly 2014), p. 272 line 4901–4920

An incomplete third recension is known from twelfth-century fragments.

== In translation and adaptation ==
19th century translations of the work include Bryan O'Looney's translation made in the 1870s, as Tain Bo Cualnge, based on the Book of Leinster in Trinity College Library, Dublin. John O'Daly's also translated the work in 1857, but it is considered a poor translation. No published translation of the work was made until the early 20th century – the first English translation was provided L. Winifred Faraday in 1904, based on the Lebor na hUidre and the Yellow Book of Lecan; a German translation by Ernst Windisch was published at around the same time based on the Book of Leinster.

Translated sections of the text had been published in the late 19th century, including one from on the Book of Leinster by Standish Hayes O'Grady in The Cuchullin Saga (ed. Eleanor Hull, 1898), as well as extracts, and introductory text. Lady Gregory's Cuchulain of Muirthemne (1903) also contains a paraphrased version of the tale. There were also several works based on the tale published in the very late 19th and early 20th century often with a focus on the hero Cú Chulainn, such as Cuchulain, the Hound of Ulster (E.Hull, 1911); Dun Dealgan, Cuchulain's Home Fort (H.G. Tempest, 1910); Cuchulain of Muirtheimhne (A.M. Skelly, 1908); The Coming of Cuculain (S. O'Grady, 1894); and several others; additionally a number of prose works from the same period took the tale as basis or inspiration, including works by W. B. Yeats, Aubrey Thomas de Vere, Alice Milligan, George Sigerson, Samuel Ferguson, Charles Leonard Moore, Fiona Macleod, as well as ballad versions from Scotland. Peadar Ua Laoghaire adapted the work as a closet drama, serialized in the Cork Weekly Examiner (1900–1). Cormac Ó Cadhlaigh published a compendiary of episodes from the Táin and tales from the broader Rúraíocht in the modern language under the title Rúraíocht in 1956.

In 1914 Joseph Dunn authored an English translation The Ancient Irish Epic Tale Táin Bó Cúalnge based primarily on the Book of Leinster. Cecile O'Rahilly published academic editions/translations of both recensions, Táin Bó Cúalnge from the Book of Leinster (1967), and Táin Bó Cúailnge Recension 1 (1976), as well as an edition of the later Stowe Version, The Stowe version of Táin Bó Cuailnge (1961).

As of 2025 three translations by Irish poets are available in mass-market editions, two in English and one in Modern Irish. Thomas Kinsella's The Táin (1969) and Ciarán Carson's The Táin (2007) were both in English, each being based primarily on the first recension with passages added from the second, although they differ slightly in their selection and arrangement of material. Kinsella's translation is illustrated by Louis le Brocquy (see Louis le Brocquy Táin illustrations) and also contains translations of a selection of remscéla. An internal translation or recension in the modern language came in 2017 in the form of Darach Ó Scolaí's Táin Bó Cuailgne. A new edition with index and notes was published in 2023.

Additionally there is The Essential Táin Bó Cúailnge and Other Stories from the Ulster Cycle (2025), a peer-reviewed and heavily annotated colloquial translation by Celtic Studies scholar Matthieu Boyd, which includes 10 texts as remscéla and 5 death-tales as the aftermath of the Táin, and updated maps from archaeologist Paul Gosling. Again, the translation of the Táin itself is based primarily on the first recension with selections from the second, but a few passages are presented only in summary.

Victorian era adapters omitted some aspects of the tale, either for political reasons relating to Irish Nationalism, or to avoid offending the sensibilities of their readers with bodily functions or sex. Tymoczko (1999), focusing on translations and adaptation of "The Táin", analysed how 19th- and 20th-century writers used the original texts in creating Irish myths as part of the process of decolonization (from the United Kingdom), and so redacted elements that did not show Cú Chulainn in a suitably heroic light. Not only was sex, and bodily functions removed, but also humor. The version by Lady Gregory (1903) took on a more 'folkish' aspect, whereas in O'Grady's version (see Hull 1898) the protagonists more resembled chivalrous medieval knights.

Several writers bowdlerized the source: for example the naked women sent to attempt to placate Cú Chulainn were omitted by most adapters of the Victorian period, or their nakedness reduced. Others interpreted the tale to their own ends - One of Peadar Ua Laoghaire's adaptations of the work, the play "Méibh", included a temperance message, blaming the conflict over the bull on the drunkenness of the Connacht messengers. In Ua Laoghaire's serialization Medb retains her role as a powerful woman, but her sexuality, exploitation of her daughter Fionnabhair, and references to menstruation are heavily euphemized. Slightly later works such as Stories from the Táin (Strachan 1908) and the derived Giolla na Tána (Strachan & O'Nolan 1914) were more accurate.

The version by Kinsella (1969) is considered to be the first English translation that accurately included both grotesque and sexual aspects of the tale; however the German translation by Windisch (1905) is considered to be complete, and lacks alterations and omissions due to conflicts of interests in the mind of contemporary Irish scholars.

Comparison of translations
Fecht n-óen do Ailill & do Meidb íar ndérgud a rígleptha dóib i Crúachanráith Chonnacht, arrecaim comrád chind cherchailli eturru. 'Fírbriathar, a ingen,' bar Ailill, 'is maith ben ben dagfir.' 'Maith omm', bar ind ingen, 'cid dia tá lat-su ón?' Middle Irish text from O'Rahilly (2014)
Feacht n-aon d'Ailill is do Mhéabh, ar a dheargadh a ríleapa dóibh i Ráth Cruachan Chonnacht, gur tharla comhrá ceannadhairte eatarthu. 'Is fíor a deirid, a bhean,' arsa Ailill, 'gur maith an bhean bean dea-fhir.' 'Is maith, go deimhin,' arsa Méabh, 'ach cén fáth a ndeir tú sin?' Modern Irish text from Ó Scolaí (2017)
It was once upon a time when Ailell and Meave where in Rath-Cruachan Connacht, and they had spread their royal couch. Between them then ensued a 'bolster-conversation'. "Woman," said Ailell, "a true saying 'tis : 'a good man's wife is good.'" "Good indeed," she answered, "but why quotest thou the same?" Standish Hayes O'Grady in Hull (1898)	Once of a time, that Ailill and Medb had spread their royal bed in Cruachan, the stronghold of Connacht, such was the pillow-talk that befell betwixt them : Quoth Ailill : "True is the saying, lady, 'She is a well-off woman that is a rich man's wife' " "Aye, that she is," answered the wife; "but wherefore opin'st thou so ?" Dunn (1914)
Then that most royal pair went to their sleeping In their own rath and their own royal house; And while their heads were on their kingly pillow, There rose this talk betwixt them. Al-yill said : "'Tis a true word, O woman, it is good To be the wife of a strong man !" Maev said : "'Tis a true word; but wherefore dost thou cite it?" Hutton (1924)	ONCE upon a time it befell Ailill and Medb that, when their royal bed had been prepared for them in Ráth Crúachain in Connacht, they spoke together as they lay on their pillow. 'In truth, woman' said Ailill, 'she is a well-off woman who is the wife of a nobleman'. 'She is indeed' said the woman. 'Why do you think so?' O'Rahilly (2014) [orig 1966]
When the royal bed was laid out for Ailill and Medb in Cruachan fort in Connacht, they had this talk on the pillows : "It is true what they say, love," Ailill said, "it is well for the wife of a wealthy man." "True enough," the woman said. "What put that in your mind?" Kinsella (1969)	One night when the royal bed had been prepared from Ailill and Medb in Crúchan Fort in Connacht, they engaged in pillow-talk: "It's true what they say, girl," said Ailill, "Well-off woman, wealthy man's wife." "True enough," said the woman. "What makes you say it?" Carson (2007)
One time, Ailill and Maeve were in their royal bed at Crúachu in Connacht, chatting as they rested on their pillow. "I'll tell you what, babe," said Ailill, "a woman has it good if she marries a nobleman." "Sure," said the babe, "but where is this coming from?" Boyd 2025 (A note gives the alternative of reading fírbriathar as referring to a proverb e.g. "A well-off woman is one well wed," and the response as "What made you think of that?" and adds that "babe" is for consistency in rendering ingen.)

== Remscéla ==
The story of the Táin relies on a range of independently transmitted back-stories, known as remscéla ('fore-tales'). Some may in fact have been composed independently of the Táin and subsequently linked with it later in their transmission. As listed by Ruairí Ó hUiginn, they are:

- De Faillsigud Tána Bó Cuailnge (How the Táin Bó Cuailnge was found), recounting how the story of the Táin was lost and recovered.
- Táin Bó Regamna (The cattle raid of Regamain)
- Táin Bó Regamon (The cattle raid of Regamon)
- Táin Bó Fraích ('The cattle Raid of Froech'): Froech mac Idaith is a Connacht warrior, killed by Cú Chulainn in the Táin; this tale gives him some back-story.
- Táin Bó Dartada (The cattle raid of Dartaid)
- Táin Bó Flidhais ('The cattle raid of Flidais'), a relatively late story drawing on older material
- Echtrae Nerai ('The Adventure of Nera')
- Aislinge Oengusa ('The Dream of Oengus'). Oengus Mac ind Óc, son of the Dagda has no part in the Táin Bó Cúailnge as we have it, but this tale relates how the otherworld woman Caer Ibormeith came to him in a vision how Oengus found her through the aid of Medb and Ailill. According to the story, this is why he helped them in their cattle-raid.
- Compert Con Culainn ('The Conception of Cú Chulainn')
- De Chophur in Dá Mucado (Of the cophur of the two swineherds)
- Fochann Loingsi Fergusa meic Róig (The cause of Fergus mac Róich's exile), only the beginning of which survives, apparently explaining how Fergus came to be part of the army of Connacht
- Longas mac nUislenn ('The Exile of the Sons of Uisliu'), explaining how Fergus and various other Ulster exiles came to be in the army of Connacht
- Tochmarc Ferbe (The wooing of Ferb).
- Ces Ulad (The debility of the Ulstermen), not actually considered one of the remscéla, but providing an important account of why Macha curses the Ulaid: they made her race against the king's horses while she was pregnant. The tale's primary purpose, however, is to provide an onomastic for the place-name Emain Machae.

== Cultural influence ==
See Irish mythology in popular culture

In 1973, the Irish Celtic rock band Horslips released a concept album, The Táin, which recounts the story from the points of view of Cú Chulainn, Queen Maeve of Connacht and Ferdia, among others.

In 2004, indie rock band The Decemberists released a five-part single also named The Tain, which loosely recounts the story of Táin Bó Cúailnge.

In 2007, a version of the epic was published by Colmán Ó Raghallaigh as a graphic novel in the modern language as An Táin, which brings to the fore the brutality, degradation, treachery, and lust of the epic – a marked contrast with previous adaptations.

In 2013, Táinrith by Biddy Jenkinson was published, a fast-paced epic prose poem based on Táin Bó Cúailnge and centred on three generations of female characters in the modern day. Doireann Ní Ghríofa described it as both a "revisionary mythopoeisis" and a "page-turner" in which nuanced characters are fashioned "with intellect, wit, and verve" as well as a certain "mischievous glee".

== See also ==
- Táin Bó
- Táin Bó Flidhais
- Tongu do dia toinges mo thúath
- An Táin (graphic novel)
