= Thomas Kinsella =

Irish poet (1928–2021)

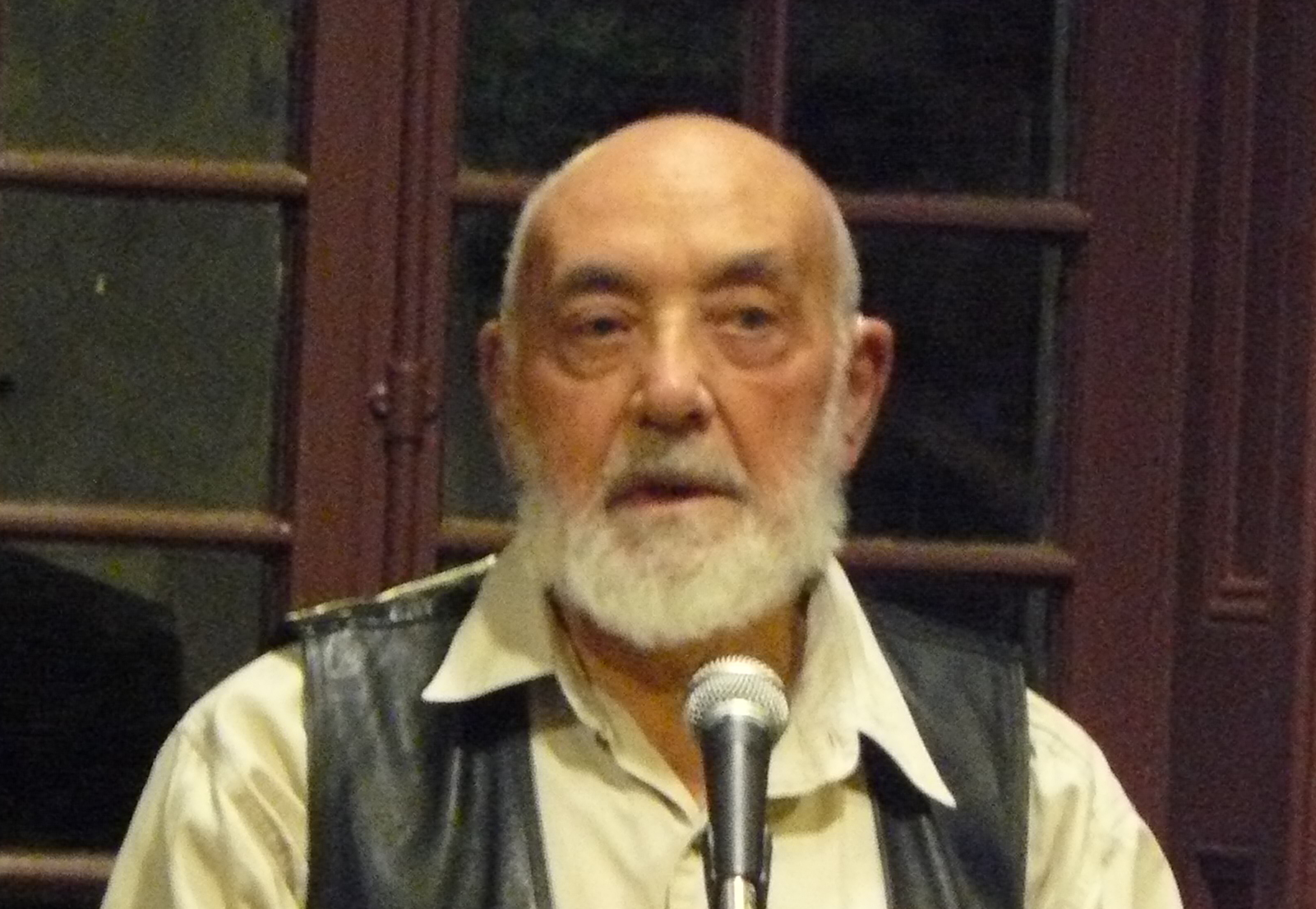
- Kinsella in 2009
- Born: 4 May 1928; Inchicore, Dublin, Ireland
- Died: 22 December 2021 (aged 93); Dublin, Ireland
- Education: Model School, Inchicore; O'Connell School; University College Dublin
- Occupations: Poet, lecturer, translator, editor
- Spouse: Eleanor Walsh (m. 1955–2017, her death)
- Writing career
- Language: English, Irish

Thomas Kinsella (4 May 1928 – 22 December 2021) was an Irish poet, translator, editor, and publisher. Born outside Dublin, he attended University College Dublin before entering the civil service. He began publishing poetry in the early 1950s and, around the same time, translated early Irish poetry into English. In the 1960s, he moved to the United States to teach English at universities, including Temple University. Kinsella continued to publish steadily until the 2010s.

== Early life and work ==
Thomas Kinsella was born on 4 May 1928 in Inchicore to working-class but "cultured" parents John Paul Kinsella and Agnes, née Casserly. His father and grandfather both worked in Guinness's brewery: his father, a union organiser, in the cooperage, later working as "a helper, a labourer, on a Guinness delivery lorry"; his grandfather ran a barge from the brewery to sea-going vessels in Dublin harbour. Kinsella spent most of his childhood in the Kilmainham/ Inchicore area of Dublin, and was educated at the Model School, Inchicore, where classes were taught in the Irish language, and at the O'Connell Schools in North Richmond Street, Dublin. He entered University College Dublin in 1946, initially to study science. After a few terms in college, he took a post in the Irish Civil Service in the department of finance and continued his university studies at night, having switched to humanities and arts.

Many of Kinsella's early poems were published in the University College Dublin magazine National Student from 1951 to 1953. His first pamphlet, The Starlit Eye (1952), was published by Liam Miller's Dolmen Press, as was Poems (1956), his first book-length publication. These were followed by Another September (1958–1962), Moralities (1960), Downstream (1962), Wormwood (1966), and the long poem Nightwalker (1967).

== Translations and editing ==
At Miller's suggestion, Kinsella turned his attention to the translation of early Irish texts. He produced versions of Longes Mac Usnig and The Breastplate of St Patrick in 1954 and of Thirty-Three Triads in 1955. His most significant work in this area was collected in two volumes. The first of these was The Táin (Dolmen, 1969; Oxford University Press, 1970), a version of the Táin Bó Cúailnge illustrated by Louis le Brocquy.

With Seán Ó Tuama, Kinsella co-edited An Duanaire: 1600–1900, Poems of the Dispossessed (1981), an anthology of Irish poems that critic Siobhán Holland describes as a "politicized deployment of the anthology genre". An Duanaire won a "special award" of the Rooney Prize for Irish Literature in 1982. He also edited Austin Clarke's Selected Poems and Collected Poems (both 1974) for Dolmen and The New Oxford Book of Irish Verse (1986).

According to critic Dillon Johnston, Kinsella's translations of Táin and An Duanaire have helped to "revitalize" the Irish literary canon.

== Later poetry ==
In 1965, Kinsella left the civil service to teach at Southern Illinois University, and in 1970 he became a professor of English at Temple University. In 1973, he started Temple's Irish studies programme.

In 1972, he started Peppercanister Press to publish his own work. The first Peppercanister production was Butcher's Dozen, a satirical response to the Widgery Tribunal into the events of Bloody Sunday. This poem drew on the aisling tradition.

Beginning around 1968 with Nightwalker and Other Poems, Kinsella's work became more influenced by American modernist poetry, particularly the poetry of Ezra Pound, William Carlos Williams, and Robert Lowell. In addition, his poetry started to focus more on the individual psyche as seen through the work of Carl Jung. These tendencies appeared in the poems of Notes from the Land of the Dead (1973) and One (1974).

According to critic Thomas H. Jackson, books including Her Vertical Smile (1985), Out of Ireland (1987), and St Catherine's Clock (1987) blended personal and world-historical perspectives: "address a self, and you find the world; address an aspect of the world, and you find a self". One Fond Embrace (1988) and Poems from Centre City (1990) allude to historical antecedents including Brian Merriman and medieval curse poetry to dissect contemporary events such as architectural development in Dublin.

== Awards and honours ==
Kinsella received the honorary Freedom of the City of Dublin on 24 May 2007. In December 2018, he received an honorary doctorate from Trinity College Dublin.

== Personal life and death ==
Kinsella's brother was the composer John Kinsella (1932–2021).

Thomas Kinsella died in Dublin on 22 December 2021, at the age of 93. His wife Eleanor predeceased him in 2017.

== Works ==
=== Poetry collections ===
- Poems (1956)
- Another September (Dolmen, 1958)
- Poems & Translations (New York: Atheneum, 1961)
- Downstream (1962)
- Tear (Cambridge, Massachusetts: Pym-Randall Press, 1969)
- Nightwalker and Other Poems (1968)
- The Good Fight (Peppercanister, 1973)
- Notes from the Land of the Dead and Other Poems (1973)
- Fifteen Dead (1979)
- One and Other Poems (1979)
- Peppercanister Poems 1972–1978 (Winston-Salem, North Carolina: Wake Forest University Press, 1980)
- One Fond Embrace (Deerfield, Massachusetts: Deerfield Press, 1981)
- St Catherine's Clock (Dolmen, 1987)
- Blood and Family (Oxford University Press, 1988)
- Madonna and Other Poems (Peppercanister, 1991)
- Open Court (Peppercanister, 1991)
- From Centre City (1994)
- The Pen Shop (Peppercanister, 1996)
- The Familiar (Peppercanister, 1999)
- Godhead (Peppercanister, 1999)
- Citizen of the World (Peppercanister, 2000)
- Littlebody (Peppercanister, 2000)
- Collected Poems 1956–2001 (Manchester: Carcanet Press, 2001; Winston-Salem, North Carolina: Wake Forest University Press, 2006)
- Marginal Economy (Dublin: Dedalus Press; Manchester: Carcanet Press, 2006)
- Belief and Unbelief (Dublin: Dedalus Press; Manchester: Carcanet Press, 2007)
- Man of War (Dublin: Dedalus Press; Manchester: Carcanet Press, 2007)
- Selected Poems (Manchester: Carcanet Press, 2007)
- Fat Master (2011)
- Love Joy Peace (2011)
- Kinsella, Thomas (2013). Late Poems. ISBN 978-1-84777-243-5. OCLC 856200411.

=== Prose collections ===
- The Dual Tradition (1995)
- Readings in Poetry (Dublin: Dedalus Press; Manchester: Carcanet Press, 2006)
- Prose Occasions: 1951–2006. Manchester: Carcanet Press. 2009. ISBN 978-1-84777-008-0. OCLC 762569615.

=== Poetry and prose ===
- A Dublin Documentary (O'Brien Press, 2007)

=== Translation ===
- The Táin, translated from the Irish epic Táin Bó Cúailnge, with illustrations by Louis le Brocquy. Dolmen, 1969; Oxford University Press, 1970.
- An Duanaire - Poems of the Dispossessed, an anthology of Gaelic poems; edited by Seán Ó Tuama. Portlaoise: Dolmen Press, 1981 ISBN 978-0-85105-363-9.

=== Audio ===
- Thomas Kinsella Poems 1956–2006 (Claddagh Records, 2007)

== Sources ==
- Abbate Badin, Donatella (1996). Thomas Kinsella. Twayne Publishers. ISBN 0-8057-7047-X. OCLC 34886173.
- Campbell, Matthew J. B., ed. (28 August 2003). The Cambridge Companion to Contemporary Irish Poetry. Cambridge University Press. doi:10.1017/CCOL0521813018. ISBN 978-0-521-01245-4.
- Davis, Alex (2001). "Thomas Kinsella and the Pound Legacy: His Jacket on the Cantos". Irish University Review. 31 (1): 38–53. ISSN 0021-1427. JSTOR 25517149.
- Fitzsimons, Andrew (6 May 2008). The Sea of Disappointment: Thomas Kinsella's Pursuit of the Real. Dublin: University College Dublin Press. ISBN 978-1-904558-98-9. OCLC 195741561.
- Fitzsimons, Andrew (16 November 2017). "Thomas Kinsella". In Dawe, Gerald (ed.). The Cambridge Companion to Irish Poets. Cambridge University Press. pp. 224–239. doi:10.1017/9781108333313.020. ISBN 978-1-108-33331-3.
- Harmon, Maurice (1974). The Poetry of Thomas Kinsella: 'With Darkness for a Nest'. Dublin: Wolfhound Press. ISBN 0-9503454-1-5. OCLC 1338362.
- Hutton, Clare, ed. (23 June 2011). The Oxford History of the Irish Book, Volume V: The Irish Book in English, 1891-2000. Oxford University Press. doi:10.1093/acprof:osobl/9780199249114.001.0001. ISBN 978-0-19-924911-4.
- Jackson, Thomas H. (1 July 1995). The Whole Matter: The Poetic Evolution of Thomas Kinsella. Syracuse University Press. ISBN 978-0-8156-2660-2.
- John, Brian (1996). Reading the Ground: The Poetry of Thomas Kinsella. The Catholic University of America Press. ISBN 978-0-8132-0838-1.
- Johnston, Dillon (1985). Irish Poetry after Joyce. University of Notre Dame Press. ISBN 0-268-01158-3. OCLC 12052555.
- Matthews, Steven (12 April 1997). Irish Poetry: Politics, History, Negotiation: The Evolving Debate, 1969 to the Present. Springer. ISBN 978-1-349-25290-9.
- McAuliffe, John (25 October 2012). "Disturbing Irish Poetry: Kinsella and Clarke, 1951–1962". In Brearton, Fran; Gillis, Alan (eds.). The Oxford Handbook of Modern Irish Poetry. Oxford University Press. doi:10.1093/oxfordhb/9780199561247.013.0014.
